= Kathleen Cruise O'Brien =

Irish suffragist, Irish language advocate, and teacher

- Born: Katherine Mary Joseph Sheehy; 28 April 1886; Loughmore, County Tipperary, United Kingdom of Great Britain and Ireland
- Died: 12 February 1938 (aged 51); Rathmines, Dublin, Republic of Ireland

Kathleen Cruise O'Brien (28 April 1886 – 12 February 1938) was an Irish suffragist, Irish language advocate, and teacher.

== Early life and family ==
She was born Katherine Mary Joseph Sheehy in Loughmore, County Tipperary on 28 April 1886. She was the youngest child of David Sheehy and Elizabeth "Bessie" Sheehy (née McCoy). Her older siblings were Hanna, Mary, Margaret, Eugene and Richard. The year O'Brien was born, the family moved to Dublin after her father's election to the British parliament. Firstly the family lived in Drumcondra, and then 2 Belvedere Place. Her father was a leading member of the Irish Parliamentary Party and a close associate of John Dillon. Her uncle, Fr Eugene Sheehy, was known as the "land league priest". O'Brien attended Dominican convent school, Eccles Street, before going on to a girls' school in Amiens, France from 1906 to 1907 as an exchange student. The French girl she exchanged with, Andrée, went on to marry her nephew Owen Sheehy-Skeffington. O'Brien went on to study Irish at University College, St Stephen's Green, going on to further perfect her language skills on the Aran Islands, County Galway.

O'Brien's mother held monthly salons at the family home from the late 1890s onwards. Many of the guest included friends of her brothers. James Joyce was a frequent visitor, and his biographer Richard Ellmann has speculated that Miss Ivors from The dead was modelled on O'Brien. This claim has been disputed.

== Career ==
Along with her sister Hanna and Mary, O'Brien was a founding member of Irish Women's Franchise League in November 1908. She was an active member of the Young Ireland Branch (YIB) of the United Irish League (UIL) which was the only branch which admitted women. She served on the executive and was elected vice president in 1910.

On 1 October 1911 she married the journalist Francis Cruise O'Brien, who was a friend of her brothers from college. Her family strongly opposed the marriage, objecting to his politics, lack of career prospects and religious agnosticism. Only Hanna and her husband, Francis Sheehy Skeffington, supported the marriage. The couple lived at 44 Leinster Rd, Rathmines, and had one son, Conor Cruise O'Brien. O'Brien taught Irish at the Rathmines technical college part-time after her marriage. Under the name Caitlín Níc Shíothaigh, O'Brien wrote Irish textbooks, and developed an Irish language edition of Gregg shorthand in the 1920s. O'Brien wrote a number of plays, included Apartments, a one-act farce which was performed at the Abbey Theatre in September 1923 which she wrote under the name Fand O'Grady.

O'Brien's extended family were divided over supporting Britain in World War I, and convinced her husband not to make speeches in favour of recruiting into the army, especially as he was medically unfit to serve himself. O'Brien was the only one of her sisters not to be widowed in 1916, when all three of her brothers-in-law died: Bernard Culhane, Francis Sheehy Skeffington, and Tom Kettle.

O'Brien's husband died in December 1927, which led to her struggle financially and fall into debt with moneylenders. She worked full-time at the Rathmines School as well as superintending Irish annual state examinations in convent schools in the west of Ireland. Despite being a practising Catholic, and receiving a lot of pressure from clergy, O'Brien kept her son at the liberal Protestant school, Sandford Park School, her husband had selected for him.

O'Brien died at home, following a stroke, on 12 February 1938.
