= Mary Bourke-Dowling =

Irish suffragette and republican

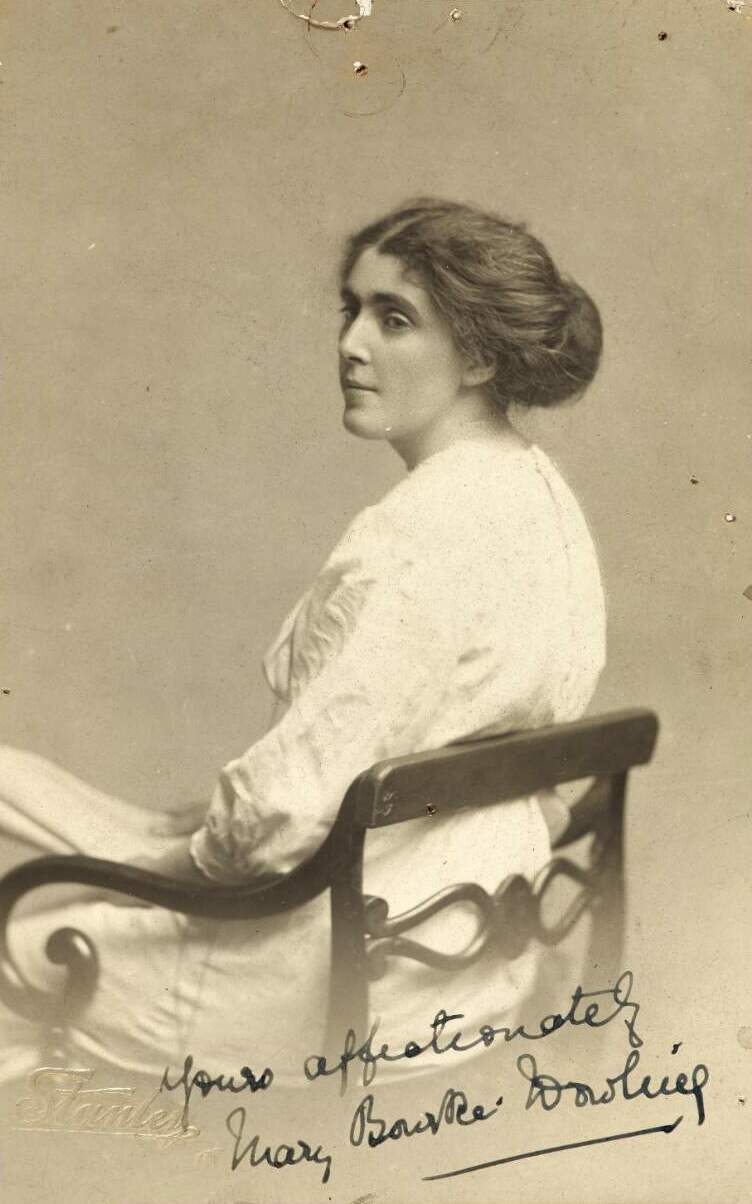
- Bourke-Dowling, c. 1910
- Born: 12 December 1882; Clontarf, Dublin
- Died: 21 July 1944 (aged 61); Clontarf, Dublin
- Known for: Activism as a suffragette and republican

Mary Bourke-Dowling (12 December 1882 – 21 July 1944) was an Irish suffragette and republican.

== Life ==
Mary Bourke-Dowling was born in Clontarf on 12 December 1882. By the early 1900s, Bourke-Dowling was an active member of the Irish Women's Franchise League. Along with Louie Bennett, Bourke-Dowling co-edited the IWFL's paper The Irish Citizen.

Bourke-Dowling was amongst several hundred suffragettes arrested in November 1911 for breaking windows in London. She had unsuccessfully attempted to break windows at the Bow Street Police Court on 27 November 1911. Along with fellow Irishwomen, she was sentenced to 5 days imprisonment for her involvement. The IWFL welcomed back the released prisoners to Dublin with a special meeting. Bourke-Dowling along with a small number of others, including Hanna Sheehy-Skeffington, were presented with a medal from the League engraved with "From Prison to Citizenship". In 1915, Bourke-Dowling addressed a meeting of Belfast suffragists.

She went on to join Cumann na mBan, and was on the Anti-Treaty side of the Irish Civil War. Her refusal to sign a declaration of fidelity to the Irish Free State government resulted in her losing her job as a writing assistant in the civil service in August 1922. Bourke-Dowling "had allowed her home to be used to harbour irregulars", those on the Anti-Treaty side. In February 1923, Bourke-Dowling was arrested and imprisoned in Kilmainham Gaol and North Dublin Union for 6 months. She was a member of the Women Prisoners' Defence League along with Margaret Buckley, and drew on her experience as a suffragette to advise her fellow prisoners on how to resist the authorities. Like many other prisoners, Bourke-Dowling documented her experience with drawings and letters. Following her release in late 1923, no more is known about her political life. She was reinstated to her job in 1932, after a number of years campaigning. On 26 April 1933, she married William H. Lewers, leading to her leaving her job owing to the marriage bar on female civil servants. Bourke-Dowling died at her home in Clontarf on 21 July 1944.

In 2018/2019, Kilmainham Gaol held an exhibit dedicated to Bourke-Dowling, exhibiting her IWFL medal and other documents for the first time.
