= Meg Connery =

Suffragist organiser and activist

Margaret Connery
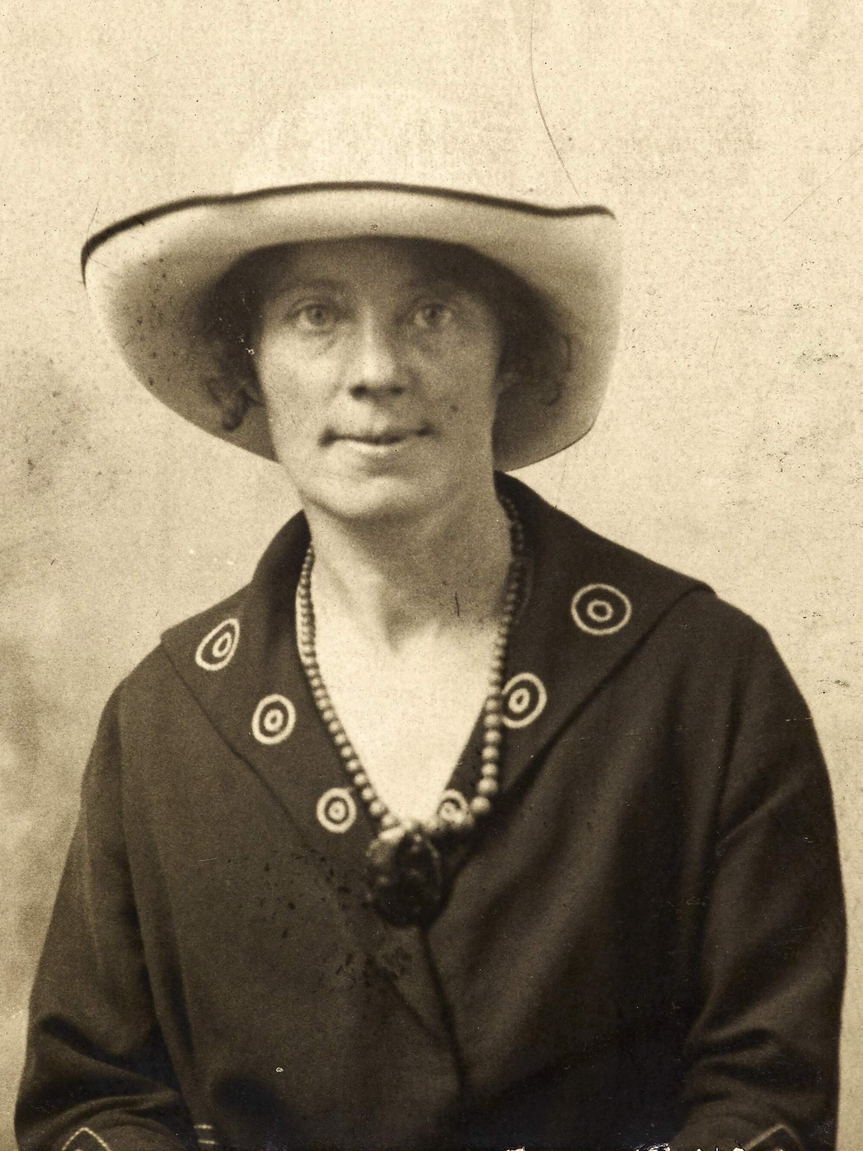
- Connery, circa 1920s
- Born: Margaret Knight; 27 June 1881; Westport County Mayo
- Died: 6 December 1958; Grangegorman, Ireland

Meg Connery (27 June 1881 – 6 December 1958) was an Irish suffragist from Westport, County Mayo. Known for her wit and bravery, she was a prominent member of the Irish Women's Franchise League (IWFL) and participated in several demonstrations advocating for women's suffrage. Notably, in 1911, she was imprisoned for a week, and in 1912, she heckled Winston Churchill and broke windows in public protests to draw attention to the cause. Connery was arrested multiple times, and in 1913 she led a hunger strike while imprisoned for window-breaking at Dublin Castle.

Connery played a key role in spreading the suffragist message, organising speaking tours in rural counties and regularly contributing to the feminist journal Irish Citizen. During World War I, she critiqued laws like the Contagious Diseases Acts, seeing them as favouring men's interests. Connery's health deteriorated after a miscarriage in 1914, but she continued to campaign for women's rights and peace. She opposed both the 1921 Anglo-Irish Treaty and the Irish Civil War and later worked for labour rights with the Irish Linen Workers' Union. She remained lifelong friends with fellow campaigner Hanna Sheehy Skeffington and died in 1956.

== Early life ==
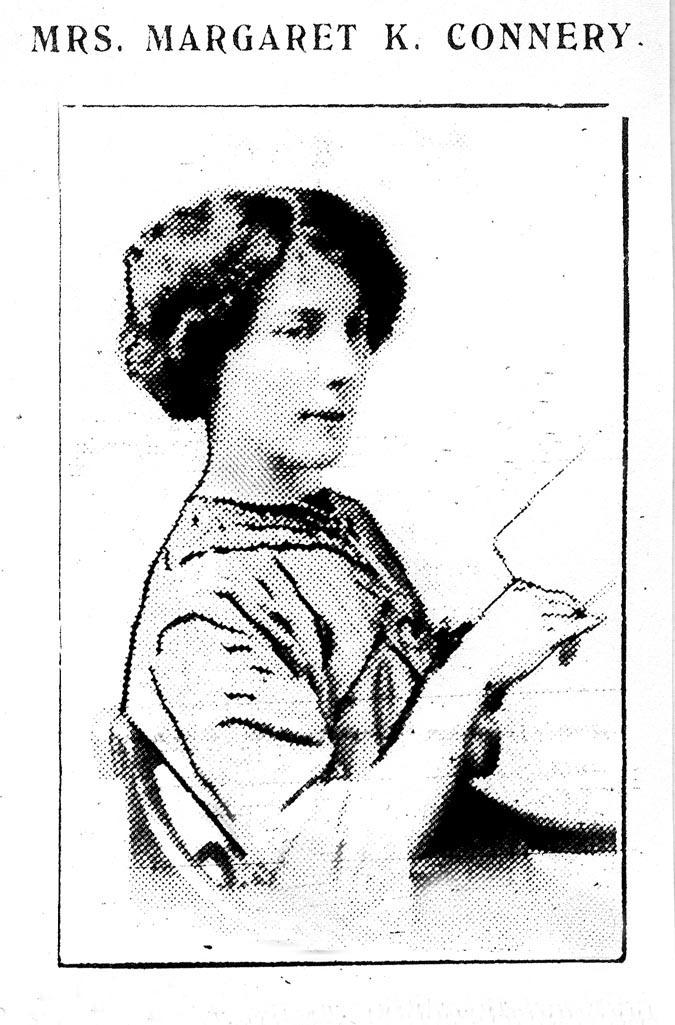
Mrs Margaret Connery in The Irish Citizen (1913)

Margaret Knight was born to parents John and Bridget Knight (née Kelly) in Triangle, Aughagower, Westport, County Mayo. She was the third of nine children. One sister, Bridget was also involved in the suffragette movement in America. Her uncle, a Franciscan Friar encouraged her education. Known as Meg, she married Con Connery in 1909. Little is known about her life before her involvement with the Irish Women's Franchise League.

== Suffrage activity ==
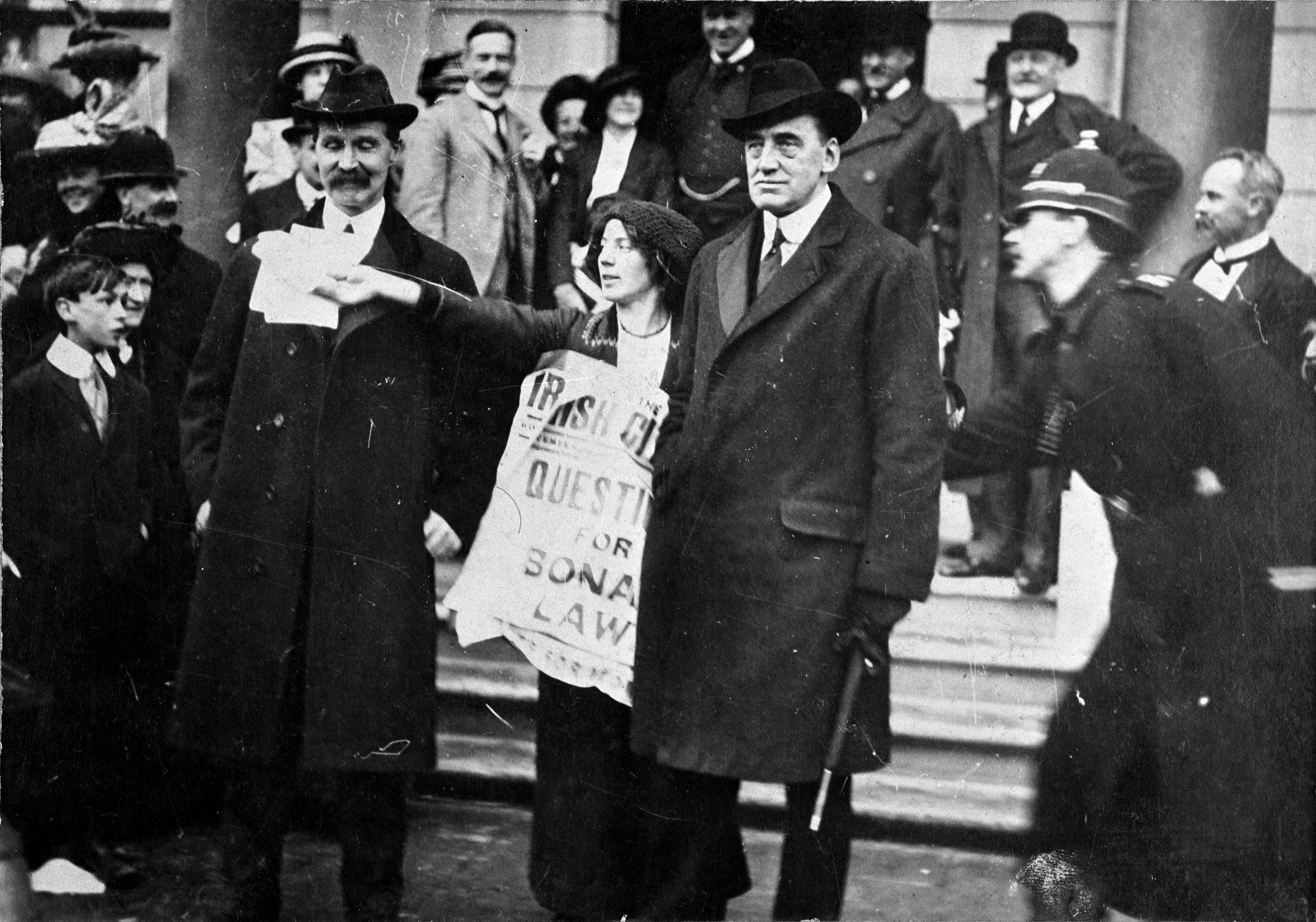
Connery attempting to hand suffragist literature to Bonar Law (left) and Edward Carson (right) in 1912

Meg Connery worked with Hanna Sheehy-Skeffington and was as becoming vice-chairwoman of the Irish Women's Franchise League. She was known for her activism, breaking windows and throwing rocks as well as demonstrating, working on the Irish Citizen and going to jail for the cause. She is particularly remembered for the photo taken of her distributing copies of the Irish Citizen to Bonar Law and Sir Edward Carson.

== Imprisonments and demonstrations ==
Connery had no illusions that women would vote in any way differently than men, or that they would use their vote more effectively. She was against the double standards that occurred between women and men. She wrote about it for The Irish Citizen more than once.

In Ireland, as elsewhere, public morals must continue in an unhealthy state while we tolerate the shameful double moral standard

Despite her regular arrests for destruction of property Connery was entirely against the use of violence to gain the vote. She was jailed for a week in November 1911 after one demonstration and again in November 1912 when she was with the group who broke windows at the Custom House. In 1912 she heckled Winston Churchill. In January 1913 she again broke the windows of Dublin Castle and was arrested, this time getting one month's imprisonment alongside Mabel Purser, Barbara Hoskins and Margaret Cousins. During this time, while in Tullamore, the women went on hunger strike as part of their demand to be treated as political prisoners. One of the other prisoners, Hoskins suffered heart failure and was released. The other women won their position. In 1914 Connery arranged for the first speeches on suffrage in Longford, Leitrim, and Roscommon.

== 1914–1918 ==
In June 1914, Connery experienced a miscarriage, after which her health declined.

World War I saw the introduction of the Contagious Diseases Acts which Connery protested as she felt the purpose was to make sex safe for men, especially the soldiers and sailors. In 1915 the British government closed the North Sea for a number of days around the international women's peace conference in The Hague and Irish women were unable to attend. Connery chaired the Irish protest meeting about this in Dublin. During the meeting Thomas MacDonagh of the nationalist paramilitary Irish Volunteers offered their full support. Connery responded by stating that she could never support the use of violence, and that she felt that love must triumph over hate.

The 1918 Representation of the People Act gave a vote to women and saw the attendance of suffragist meetings sharply decline thereafter, however Connery remained active. Connery was critical of the limited access given and continued to demand full equality.

== Other concerns ==
Connery was a member of the Irish Linen Worker's Union. She worked for improvements in working conditions. She also worked for the Irish White Cross and in 1922 she was part of a delegation to review the destruction in counties Tipperary and Cork by the wars in Ireland.

Connery opposed the signing of the Anglo-Irish Treaty in December 1921, however, unlike many others, she did not endorse the ensuing Irish Civil War.

== Personal life ==
She married John Patrick 'Con' Connery in Clonmel in July 1909.

Meg Connery died of heart failure on 6 December 1958. She was buried by at Mount Jerome Cemetery, Harold's Cross Dublin, in an unmarked grave, alongside her husband Con who predeceased her.

== Commemoration ==
In April 2024, a headstone was erected on Connery's rediscovered grave by the Meg Connery memorial committee.

== References and sources ==
- "Dictionary of Irish Biography". Cambridge University Press.
- "SC034 Margaret Connery (1879-1956), Irish Citizen, 08 February 1913". Dublin City Council. 8 February 1913.
- Mulhall, Ed (11 May 1915). "Pacificism or Physical Force? - Century Ireland". RTÉ Ireland's National Television and Radio Broadcaster.
- Ryan, L.; Ward, M. (2018). Irish Women and the Vote: Becoming Citizens, New Edition. Irish Academic Press. ISBN 978-1-78855-015-4.
- "Context: [Margaret Connery, Mabel Purser, Barbara Hoskins,..." Catalogue. 10 July 1919.
- Yeates, P. (2012). A City in Turmoil – Dublin 1919–1921: The War of Independence. Dublin at War. Gill Books. ISBN 978-0-7171-5463-0.
- Ward, Margaret (8 October 2017). "When freedom was in the air, Irish suffragettes took steps to win equality". Independent.ie.
- Steele, K.M. (2007). Women, Press, and Politics During the Irish Revival. Irish studies. Syracuse University Press. ISBN 978-0-8156-3141-5.
- Luddy, M. (1995). Women in Ireland, 1800-1918: A Documentary History. Irish history. Cork University Press. ISBN 978-1-85918-038-9.
- Reynolds, P. (2007). Modernism, Drama, and the Audience for Irish Spectacle. Cambridge University Press. p. 82. ISBN 978-0-521-87299-7.
- Moriarty, Therese (21 March 2013). "Suffrage and socialism: links with Labour". The Irish Times.
- "Irish Women's Franchise League and Irish Women's Workers' Union". History Ireland. 13 March 2013.
