= Marguerite Palmer =

Irish suffragette

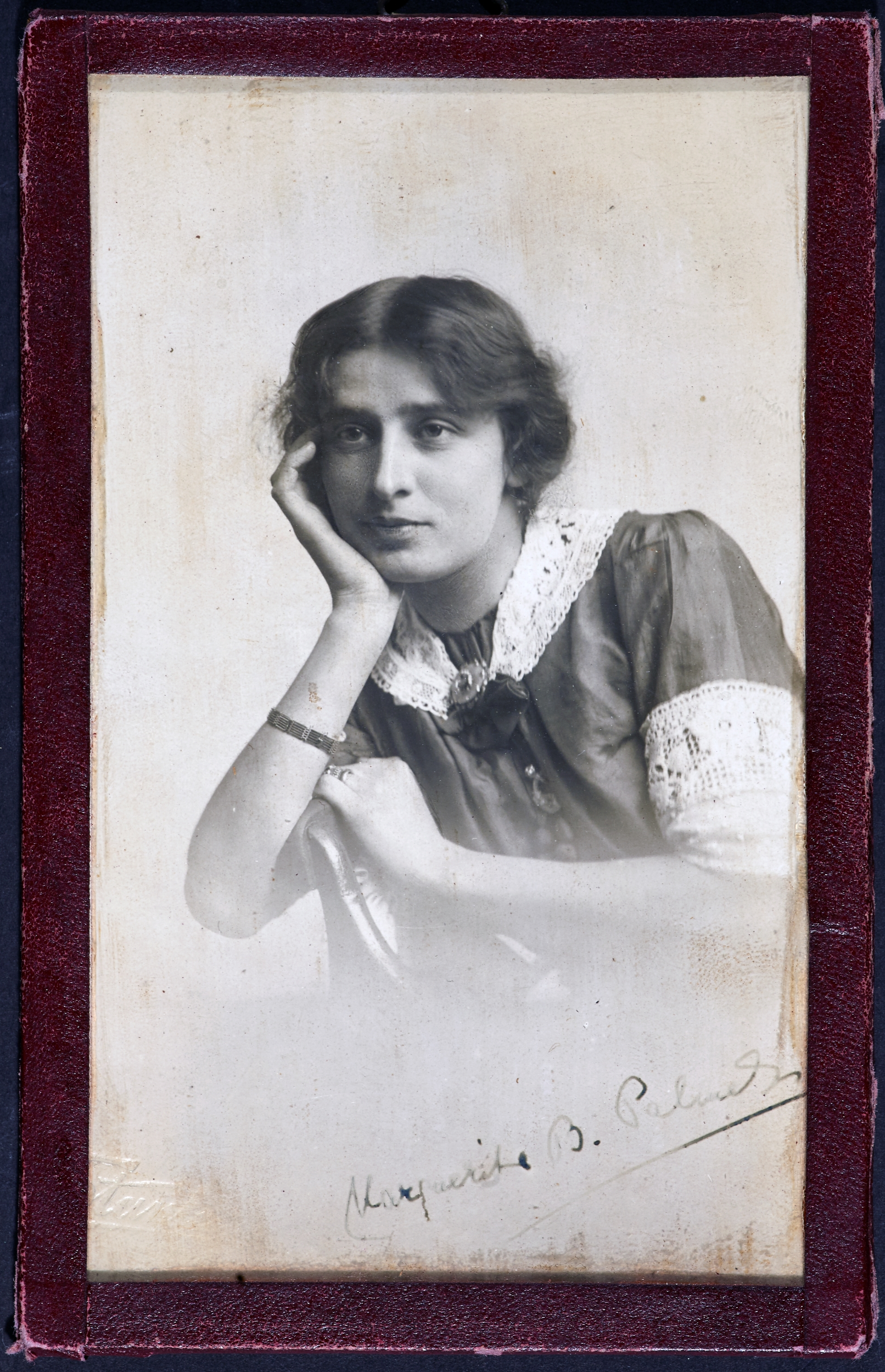
- Born: Marguerite Blanche Bannister; 18 May 1886; Newtownards, County Down
- Known for: Activism as a suffragette

Marguerite or Margaret Blanche Palmer (born 18 May 1886) was an Irish suffragette and was among the first group of suffragettes imprisoned in Ireland, and later known as one of the "Tullamore Mice".

== Personal life ==
Marguerite Palmer, also known as Margaret Palmer, was born Marguerite Blanche Bannister in Newtownards, County Down on 18 May 1886. Her father, George Winslow Bannister, was a clergyman, and her mother was Anna (née Gaillard). On 5 September 1910 she married Richard James Weldon Palmer, a commercial traveller from Wexford, later an accountant. She boycotted the 1911 census, alongside numerous suffragettes, but her husband and mother-in-law Eliza, who is listed as "unenfranchised" were registered at 56 Beechwood Avenue, Rathmines. Palmer had become a member of the Irish Women's Franchise League (IWFL) before her marriage and it appears that her husband supported her in her involvement in the movement. She was among the earliest members of the IWFL, and one of the most prominent, going on to serve as the honorary secretary.

== Activism ==
Palmer is listed alongside Margaret Connery in the Aberdeen Journal in November 1911 for taking part in the mass demonstration for women's suffrage which obstructed the areas around Parliament Square, Whitehall, and the Strand in London. She was imprisoned in Holloway for a week for her part in these protests. She was a close acquaintance of Hanna Sheehy-Skeffington, and organised an IWFL meeting at the Phoenix Park with her which saw over 1000 women attend. They both addressed the crowd, outlining why they were willing to be imprisoned for the cause.

She was arrested on 13 June 1912 alongside Sheehy-Skeffington and six other women for breaking windows at Dublin Castle. Having refused to pay the fine for the damages, she was incarcerated at Mountjoy Prison, where they received a number of privileges, but they chose to hunger strike in sympathy with suffragettes in Britain. Palmer was featured on the front cover of The Irish Citizen on 22 June 1912, with Sheehy-Skeffington and the Murphy sisters, under the headline "Prisoners for Liberty". She heckled both Mr Birrell at a meeting of the Law Students Debating Society and Edward Carson at Rathmines Town Hall. She was one of the organisers of the census boycott in Ireland, and lobbied Irish MPs on the second reading of the Conciliation Bill on behalf of the IWFL.

She was again imprisoned for breaking glass at the United Irish League on 16 May 1913, and was sent to Mountjoy Prison again for a sentence of 6 weeks for defaulting on a fine. She was later transferred to Tullamore Gaol with Dora Ryan and Annie Walsh. Palmer again went on hunger strike with Walsh. They were released on 18 June under the Cat and Mouse Act, allowing their release and then detainment once their health had improved. An interview and account of her experiences in Tullamore was published in the Irish Citizen under the headline "The Tale of the Tullamore Mice".

After her imprisonment in Tullamore Jail, Marguerite and her husband had two children, Joan (b. 1914, later Mrs George Freeman) and Roger (b. 1918).

Marguerite remained a resident of Dublin for the rest of her life; she was widowed in March 1968 but her whereabouts following that remain unclear.
