= Marjorie Hasler =

Irish suffragette

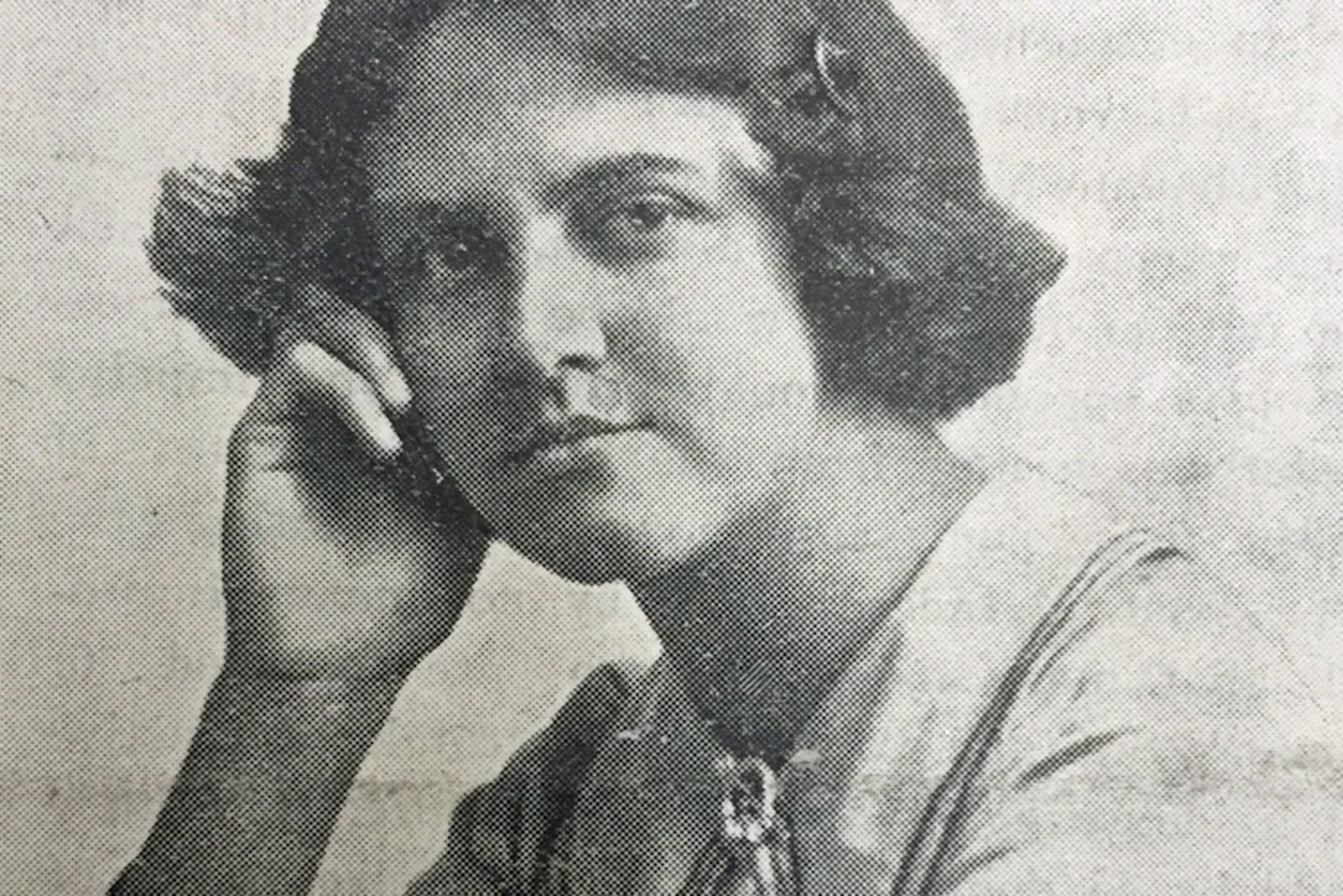
- Born: c. 1887
- Died: 31 March 1913 (aged 25–26)
- Known for: Activism as a suffragette

Marjorie Hasler (c. 1887 – 31 March 1913) was an Irish suffragette, deemed to be "the first Irish martyr for the suffragette cause".

== Biography ==
Marjorie Hasler was born around 1887 in Ireland, with nothing else known about her early life or family. She joined the Irish Women's Franchise League (IWFL) in July 1910. On 18 November 1910 Hasler was one of the Irish deputies who travelled to London to support Emmeline Pankhurst with her petition to H. H. Asquith, the British Prime Minister. In the ensuing violence of this day, which became known as "Black Friday", Hasler suffered a head injury when she was knocked against a wall. As a result she suffered headaches intermittently, as well as some damage to her spine. This did not dissuade Hasler from her militant action, returning to London the next year when she was imprisoned for 14 days for breaking government windows.

In June 1912, Hasler was imprisoned with Hanna Sheehy Skeffington and six other women in Mountjoy Prison for her part in breaking the windows of the General Post Office, Dublin. These eight women were the first to be convicted and imprisoned in Ireland for militant suffragette action. Hasler was fined £10 and sentenced to six months, which was the longest sentence of any of the eight convicted suffragists.

Hasler compared suffragists to Land Leaguers in an article for The Irish Citizen on 22 June 1912: "We don't like smashing windows any more than men like smashing skulls, but in both cases there is, I believe, a strong feeling that something must be broken before a wrong can be righted." She was released on 10 November 1912 after serving four months, following the submission of a petition signed by ten of the jurymen who convicted her. Sheehy Skeffington claimed that Hasler refused to let the IWFL petition on her behalf.

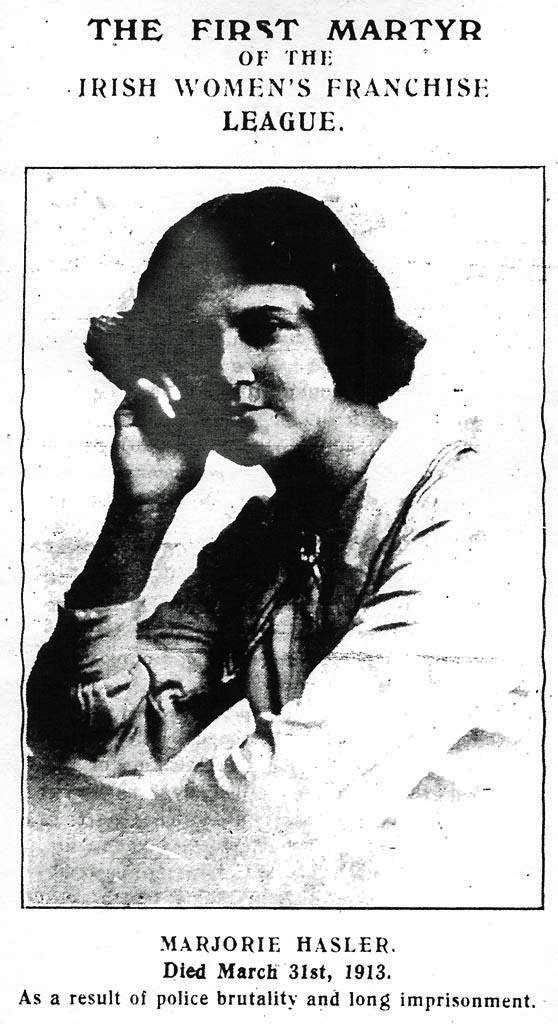
Marjorie Hasler, First Martyr

Upon leaving prison, Hasler's health was damaged, however this is in contrast to Sheehy Skeffington's testimony of Hasler's athletic stunts whilst in prison. Hasler died suddenly of heart failure on 31 March 1913 after contracting measles. Her fellow suffragists and The Irish Citizen maintained that it was her imprisonment and police brutality that had damaged her health in the year preceding her death.

Sheehy Skeffington described her as "singularly beautiful, her face clear-cut as a cameo, with flashing brown eyes, framed in short brown curls."
