= Rathmines Town Hall =

Municipal building in Rathmines, County Dublin, Ireland

- Halla an Bhaile Ráth Maonais
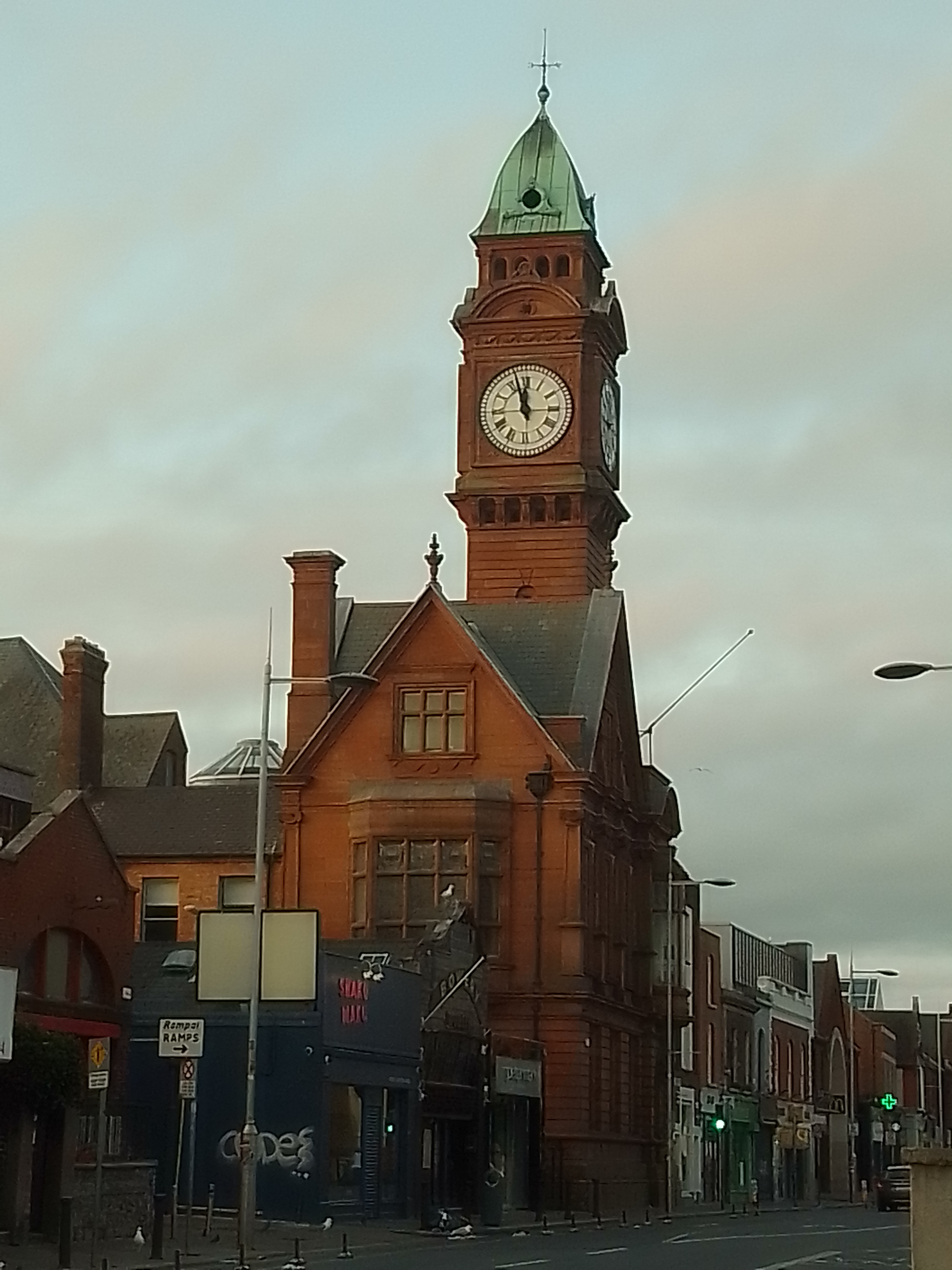
- Rathmines Town Hall

- Location within Dublin

General information
- Architectural style: Baroque style
- Location: Rathmines Road Lower, Rathmines, Ireland
- Coordinates: 53.3241°N 6.2652°W
- Completed: 1896

Design and construction
- Architect: Sir Thomas Drew

Rathmines Town Hall (Irish: Halla an Bhaile Ráth Maonais) is a municipal building in Rathmines Road Lower, Rathmines, Dublin, Ireland. The building currently accommodates Rathmines College of Further Education.

== History ==
=== Early history ===
After significant population growth, largely associated with its development as a residential suburb of Dublin, the township of Rathmines appointed town commissioners in 1847. The town commissioners established their first town hall at 71 Rathmines Road but, after it expanded to become the township of Rathmines and Rathgar in 1862 and after other townships in Dublin erected their own town halls, the Rathmines town commissioners decided to erect a more substantial building on the same site.

The new building was designed by Sir Thomas Drew in the Baroque style, built by John Good in red sandstone and brick and was officially opened in 1896. The design involved an asymmetrical main frontage of four bays facing onto Rathmines Road Lower. The right-hand bay featured a round headed opening with an ornate archivolt and a keystone carved with a human face. There was a semi-circular oriel window on the first floor, surmounted by a segmental pediment. Above and behind, there was a three-stage tower with lancet windows in the first stage, clock faces in the second stage and arcades in the third stage, all surmounted by an ogee-shaped dome and a weather vane. The left hand section of three bays was fenestrated by cross-windows on both floors. There were panels with carvings of swags above the first floor windows, which were flanked by Ionic order pilasters supporting an entablature and a modillioned cornice. Above the left-hand section there was a large triangular pediment, with a tripartite mullioned and transomed window, surmounted by a date stone, in the tympanum. The clock in the tower was made by Chancellor and Son of Bachelors Walk, but it was unreliable and the time shown on the different faces were inconsistent, so the clock became known as the "four-faced liar". Internally, the principal rooms were the council chamber and a large concert hall, with a gallery and a stage, capable of accommodating 2,000 people seated. The interior decoration was undertaken by Carlo Cambi of Siena.

=== Public events venue ===
The town hall became an important venue for public events: a performance of the oratorio, The Messiah, by George Frideric Handel, took place there in 1897. In 1899, the town commissioners were replaced by an urban district council, with the town hall becoming the offices of the new council. The new urban district council met for the first time in the town hall in January 1899. The engineer, Guglielmo Marconi, demonstrated his new wireless telegraphy system there later in 1899.

The entertainer, Percy French, gave several performances there in the early 20th century. Following an incident when the suffragette, Marguerite Palmer, heckled the Unionist politician, Edward Carson, when he addressed a meeting in the town hall, Palmer was arrested and featured on the front cover of The Irish Citizen on 22 June 1912, with Hanna Sheehy-Skeffington and the Murphy sisters, under the headline "Prisoners for Liberty". The building was secured by troops of the British Army under the command of Major Sir Francis Fletcher-Vane during the Easter Rising, but Hanna Sheehy-Skeffington's husband, Francis, was unlawfully executed during the fighting.

At a special Ard Fheis of Sinn Féin held in the town hall in March 1926, Éamon de Valera resigned from the party after the defeat of his proposal that elected members be allowed to take their seats in the Dáil Éireann once the controversial Oath of Allegiance was removed. He went on to establish his own party, Fianna Fáil, two months later. In the late 1920s, comic operas by Gilbert and Sullivan were an annual event there with Trial by Jury in 1927, H.M.S. Pinafore in 1928 and both Cox and Box and The Pirates of Penzance in 1930.

The building ceased to be the local seat of government in 1930 when Rathmines was annexed by Dublin in accordance with the Local Government (Dublin) Act 1930. A convention of the Republican Congress was held in the building in September 1934, and a convention of the National Corporate Party was held there in July 1936. In May 1945, the future President of Ireland, Erskine Hamilton Childers, attended the town hall to deliver a speech to the Irish Red Cross Society arguing that the destiny of Ireland was "inextricably linked with that of Europe". During the 1973 general election, Liam Cosgrave gave a speech in the town hall announcing proposals for extra expenditure on social reforms: his party won the election, and he became Taoiseach.

The building became the home of Rathmines College of Further Education in 1980. An extensive programme of alterations, involving the installation of false ceilings into the concert hall to create classrooms, was carried out at that time. In 2018, several councillors on the South East Area Subcommittee of Dublin City Council advocated bringing the concert hall back into use when the lease to the college expires in 2032.
