= IWFL =

IWFL may refer to:

- Independent Women's Football League
- Irish Women's Franchise League
