= 1914 Kingstown Urban District Council election =

1914 Irish local government election

Elections to the Kingstown Urban District Council took place on Thursday 15 January 1914 as part of that year's Irish local elections. The election resulted in a shock defeat for the Unionists, who prior to the election had majority control of the council.

Kingstown was composed of four multi-member wards, with councillors being elected through Plurality-at-large voting.

== Results by party ==
Party	Seats	±	Votes	%	±%
Irish Nationalist	15	▲7	6,984	49.61	
Irish Unionist	6	▼7	6,407	45.51	
Independent	0	Steady	379	2.69	
WNHA	0	Steady	309	2.19	
Totals	21	Steady	14,079	100.00	—

== Ward results ==
=== Monkstown ===
Monkstown (3) Electorate: 406
Party	Candidate	Votes	%	±%
Irish Nationalist	J. J. Kennedy (incumbent)	207	46.04	
Irish Nationalist	Sylvester Troy	183		
Irish Unionist	A. V. McCormick (incumbent)	169	53.96	
Irish Unionist	F. Middleton Bentley	150		
Irish Unionist	Dr. O. Studdert Mannell	138		
Turnout		341	83.99	
Irish Nationalist hold		Swing		
Irish Nationalist gain from Irish Unionist		Swing		
Irish Unionist hold		Swing		

=== West ===
West (6)
Party	Candidate	Votes	%	±%
Irish Nationalist	J. Smyth (incumbent)	577		
Irish Nationalist	M. F. O'Brien	562		
Irish Nationalist	J. Trirston (incumbent)	558		
Irish Nationalist	William Field (incumbent)	566		
Irish Nationalist	J. Devitt	535		
Irish Nationalist	C. Rochford (incumbent)	532		
Irish Unionist	William Dawson	257		
Irish Unionist	Gerald Curtis	247		
Irish Unionist	Val. Fleming	243		
Irish Unionist	Albert Fleming	242		
Irish Unionist	William Wilson	174		
Irish Unionist	Francis Walkington	148		
Independent	J. Scully	134		
Turnout		4,775		
Irish Nationalist hold		Swing		
Irish Nationalist hold		Swing		
Irish Nationalist hold		Swing		
Irish Nationalist hold		Swing		
Irish Nationalist hold		Swing		
Irish Nationalist hold		Swing		

=== East ===
East (6)
Party	Candidate	Votes	%	±%
Irish Unionist	Sir Thomas Robinson (incumbent)	384		
Irish Unionist	W. A. Evans (incumbent)	379		
Irish Unionist	Colonel Blood (incumbent)	375		
Irish Unionist	Jos. Vaughan (incumbent)	375		
Irish Unionist	Colonel Drury (incumbent)	372		
Irish Nationalist	M. F. O'Brien	352		
Irish Unionist	Major Willoughby Forth (incumbent)	348		
Irish Nationalist	John Carr	339		
WNHA	Mrs F. Redmond	309		
Independent	Chas. Reddy	245		
Turnout		3,478		
Irish Unionist hold		Swing		
Irish Unionist hold		Swing		
Irish Unionist hold		Swing		
Irish Unionist hold		Swing		
Irish Unionist hold		Swing		
Irish Nationalist gain from Irish Unionist		Swing		

=== Glasthule ===
Glasthule (6) Electorate: 975
Party	Candidate	Votes	%	±%
Irish Nationalist	Louis Monks (incumbent, West Ward)	439		
Irish Nationalist	H. J. Monks (incumbent)	435		
Irish Nationalist	M. J. McAllister	431		
Irish Nationalist	John Walters	428		
Irish Nationalist	Michael Murray	424		
Irish Nationalist	J. McCartan	416		
Irish Unionist	M. A. Manning (incumbent)	412		
Irish Unionist	H. Keating Clay (incumbent)	410		
Irish Unionist	R. N. Potterton (incumbent)	401		
Irish Unionist	F. H. Croskerry (incumbent)	400		
Irish Unionist	W. A. Barrett	392		
Irish Unionist	Major James (incumbent)	391		
Turnout		850	87.18	
Irish Nationalist hold		Swing		
Irish Nationalist gain from Irish Unionist		Swing		
Irish Nationalist gain from Irish Unionist		Swing		
Irish Nationalist gain from Irish Unionist		Swing		
Irish Nationalist gain from Irish Unionist		Swing		
Irish Nationalist gain from Irish Unionist		Swing		
