= Patricia Hoey =

Irish suffragette

- Born: Ethel Mary Hoey; 15 November 1883; 7 Trafalgar Terrace, Dublin, Ireland
- Died: 9 November 1930 (aged 46); Our Lady of Lourdes hospital, Kill of the Grange, Dublin, Ireland
- Known for: Activism as a suffragette

Patricia Hoey (15 November 1883 – 9 November 1930) was an Irish journalist, suffragist, Irish Republican and nationalist.

== Early life and family ==
Patricia Hoey was born Ethel Mary Hoey at 7 Trafalgar Terrace, Dublin on 15 November 1883. Her parents were Edmond and Margaret Hoey (née Mulchinock). Her maternal great-uncle was William Pembroke Mulchinock, the purported composer of The Rose of Tralee, and her great-great-uncle was John Mulchinock. Hoey's father died on 3 March 1887, which left his widow with just £78 and heavily pregnant with her second child, Edmund Joseph who was born on 15 April. There is no record of Hoey's childhood or education. It appears that her mother remarried, and that the family may have moved to England. In the 1920s Hoey was described as supporting her mother who was recorded as 'Mrs Clive Howard' and a step-sister who was described as deaf and dumb.

== Life in England ==
Hoey was living in England in May 1909, where she attended a meeting of the United Irish League (UIL) of Great Britain. She was described as the honourable secretary of the London parliamentary branch. Hoey was referred to as an experienced journalist by UIL president Joseph Devlin, when the group agreed to publish a monthly bulletin. From 1909 to 1910 Hoey was working as a freelance journalist and freelance business administrator. She was the general manager of the International Business Exhibition in October 1909, and she claimed to be the first woman ever to be appointed to that role, overseeing 200 men. After this, she returned to working solely as a journalist, contributing to The Times, Daily Telegraph, Daily Mirror, and The Stage. She co-authored a book, What editors want: a reference book for every free-lance writer with Max Rittenberg in 1909.

On 18 June 1910, Hoey attended a march of over 10,000 women to the Albert Hall as secretary to the parliamentary branch of the UIL. In July 1910, she was one of the 160 speakers at the suffrage demonstration in Hyde Park. Hoey was announced as the first president of the newly formed Irish Women's Franchise League (IWFL), London in the Freeman's Journal on 15 March 1911. The Common Cause announced she had been appointed press secretary on 20 April 1911 with the task of getting more accurate and fuller reports of the suffrage movement into the London papers. Hoey accompanied Hanna Sheehy-Skeffington and Kathleen Shannon to a meeting with John Redmond on 27 July 1911 to ask him and the Irish Parliamentary Party (IPP) to support the women's suffrage bill, which he refused. She was part of the Irish delegation that met with Prime Minister H. H. Asquith on 17 November 1911 regarding women's suffrage under the home rule bill. Hoey severed her links to the UIL and IPP in 1912, resigning as secretary, citing the party's refusal to back women's suffrage claiming it was a betrayal of Irish nationalism: "We are not only working for women's suffrage but for the holy Cause of Ireland. The Irish Party are asking Home Rule for a section of Ireland – we are asking it for the whole of Ireland."

== Life in Ireland ==
Hoey left England for Canada in June 1913, sailing from Liverpool to Quebec on the Teutonic. She worked for the Canadian government, conducting research on maple-syrup farmers. She had returned to Ireland by 3 February 1916, where she was appointed to inquire into cases of outdoor relief and coal distribution recorded in the relieving officer's books. On 22 February she delivered a speech on the women's movement in Canada. She joined Ard Craobh Cumann na mBan and was stationed at the Imperial Hotel on O'Connell Street under the command of Frank Thornton during the Easter Rising. Commandant Seamus Daly stated that she was in charge of 7-8 Cumann na mBan women, and said she was the "most efficient and hard-working woman during the whole thing". Hoey was in charge of evacuating the women from the hotel when it was bombed.

After the Rising, Hoey became involved with Sinn Féin. In July 1917 at an IWFL meeting she declared that the IPP's lack of support for women's suffrage would ultimately lead to the demise of the party. According to a British government file, Hoey was considered one of the most energetic propagandists in Dublin as a member of Sinn Féin and Cumann na mBan. Around the same time, she was temporarily employed by the British government, and she claimed that she was offered a permanent civil service position if she renounced Sinn Féin and took the oath of allegiance. She refused and was dismissed. During the War of Independence, she worked as a propagandist for Sinn Féin at its headquarters at 6 Harcourt Street, Dublin and as confidential secretary to Arthur Griffith. Hoey was arrested at the Harcourt Street location and interrogated at Dublin Castle. She also maintained a secret office for Michael Collins at her home at 5 Mespil Road under the name O'Brien. At this house, Hoey occasionally hosted cabinet meetings, with Collins using it as an office during the day for meetings. Hoey was appointed secretary to the Dáil courts on Henry Street by Collins. The auxiliary British forces occupied 5 Mespil Road for 24 hours in April 1921 in an attempt to catch Collins unaware. Hoey circumvented them by pretending her mother was unwell and calling on Dr Alice Barry who then took papers from the house, smuggled them to Collins with a warning for him to stay away. Hoey's house was ransacked, with her possessions taken or destroyed, and she was imprisoned in Mountjoy prison for several weeks until she was released in June due to a lack of any evidence against her. During her incarceration, along with other women, Collins sent her items such as books, food, and tea.

Following the truce in July 1921, Griffith requested that she work on the negotiations regarding Ulster. Hoey was pro-treaty, and was enlisted in the National Army as assistant military censor on 20 June 1922, working under Piaras Béaslaí. Béaslaí later stated that she did exactly the same work as her male peers, operating under great personal danger. After the civil war, she attempted to enter politics, as a founding member of the Women's Independent Association, and later running unsuccessfully in the 1925 Seanad election. She faced scepticism from the Irish Free State government, who were unwilling to pay her a pension. She petitioned Béaslaí, Kevin O'Higgins, and William Cosgrave, but was only awarded £24.3.4.

In July 1926, Hoey organised a dispensary for the treatment of sick animals of the poor in Portobello Harbour, Dublin. It was so successful, that it became a reoccurring evening on every Wednesday and Saturday. In 1926 she was working for the Hearst press. Hoey disappears from the records until January 1929, when her mother petitioned the government for money when she mentions her daughter's illness. Hoey died on 9 November 1930 of pulmonary tuberculosis at Our Lady of Lourdes hospital, Kill of the Grange, Dublin. She is buried in Glasnevin Cemetery, with her funeral attended by Colonel Joseph O'Reilly representing President Cosgrave, Richard Mulcahy and Justice John Reddin among others.
