= Mary Cosgrave =

- Born: Mary Josephine Daly c. 1877; Naas, County Kildare
- Died: 17 November 1941 (aged 63–64)
- Education: St. Mary's Convent, Naas; University of St Andrews
- Spouse: Maurice Joseph Cosgrave

Mary Cosgrave (c. 1877 – 17 November 1941) was an Irish social worker and local politician.

== Life ==
Mary Cosgrave was born Mary Josephine Daly in Naas, County Kildare around 1877. Her parents were James William and Jane Daly. She attended St Mary's Convent in Naas, going on to University of St Andrews for a Lady Literate in Arts or LLA. She came to Ireland to live in Rathmines, Dublin, taking up a position as a lecturer at the Training College of Our Lady of Mercy, Baggot Street in 1896. She was an examiner in English for the intermediate board of education. She married the solicitor and journalist Maurice Joseph Cosgrave in July 1901.

Cosgrave developed an interest in maternity and child welfare work, becoming a prominent member of the Women's National Health Association from its inception. She succeeded Lady Aberdeen as president in 1939. She became associated with the Peamount sanatorium due to her work against tuberculosis, again she replaced Lady Aberdeen as the president of the sanatorium in 1939. Cosgrave was also a number of Peamount's After Care Guild.

In 1922, she was elected to the Rathmines urban district council. She went on to become a member of Dublin Corporation in 1933, serving until her death. As part of her work in the corporation, she sat on a number of committees such as the Cheeverstown Convalescent Home for Little Children committee, the National Children's Hospital committee, the city of Dublin child welfare committee, the city of Dublin vocational educational committee, and the housing committee. Cosgrave served as president of the committees for the county libraries, the Meath Hospital, and the Dublin County Council until 1930. She was also involved in the Civics Institute. As an active member of the Irish Women Citizens' Association she held the position of chair. At international congresses, Cosgrave was the representative of the National Council of Ireland. She died at her home at Woodside, 17 Park Drive, Cowper Gardens, Dublin on 17 November 1941.
