= Maeve Cavanagh McDowell =

20th century Irish writer

- Born: Maeve Cavanagh (or Kavanagh); 1878; Dublin, Ireland
- Died: 1960 (aged 81–82)
- Occupation: poet

Maeve Cavanagh McDowell (1878–1960) was an Irish republican poet and writer. She was called the "Poetess of the revolution" by James Connolly.

== Life ==
Maeve Cavanagh (sometimes spelt Kavanagh) was born on South Frederick Street, Dublin in 1878. Her father, a clerk, had been a member of the Irish Republican Brotherhood. Her younger brother, Ernest, was a political cartoonist and clerk in the Irish Transport and General Workers' Union. She also had a sister, Sarah Fraser, and a brother John (Jack) who was "lost at sea".

Her 1914, Sheaves of Revolt, described the horror and brutality of World War I and was aimed at discouraging Irish men from joining the British Army. McDowell became more active as a republican, joining Cumann na mBan and the Gaelic League. Active in socialist circles, she wrote for the Worker's Republic. She was a member of the first committee of the Gaelic League. She contributed to the short lived newspaper, The Irish Peasant, published by W.P. Ryan.

Her poem, Ireland to Germany, published during World War I was quoted in the British Parliament as evidence of a conspiracy.

Frustrated by the lack of activity in Cumann na mBan, she joined the Irish Citizen's Army in Liberty Hall. During the Easter Rising, she was sent to Waterford with a dispatch from James Connolly to Sean Matthews communicating Patrick Pearse's remobilisation orders after Eoin MacNeill's countermanding order.

Her brother was shot during the Easter Rising outside Liberty Hall, he was unarmed. His death was attributed to a stray bullet, but McDowell in her dedication of a book to her brother stated he was "murdered by the English military on the steps of Liberty Hall". An edition of A Voice of Insurgency that she published on Christmas Eve 1916 sold our in 28 days. She is credited with recovering the lost manuscript of Anna Parnell's The Tale of a Great Sham.

McDowell remained active in the nationalist movement until 1923. Between 1923 and 1928, she published 36 poems in the Catholic Bulletin.

In 1921 or 1922 she married Cathal McDowell (sometimes spelt MacDowell, also known as Cathal Macdubhghaill). He died in Nice in 1926.

She signed the 1936 Roll of Honour of 1916, one of 157 women, who signed as survivors of the Easter Rising. In 1937, she sat on the committee of the Old Irish Citizen Army Comrades' Association. She died in 1960.

== Works ==
- Sheaves of Revolt (Dublin: City Printing, 1914)
- A Voice of Insurgency (Dublin, 1916)
- A Ballad for Rebels (Dublin, 1916)
- Passion Flowers (Dublin, 1917)
- Soul and Clay (Dublin: WH West, 1917), with portrait and foreword by F. R. Higgins
- Ireland to Germany (Dublin: Shan-van-Vocht, undated)
- Thomas Ashe (Dublin, undated)
- A Flame from the Whins (undated)
