= Edith Young =

Irish suffragist organiser and activist

- Born: Edith Mary O'Connor; 10 September 1882; Dalkey, County Dublin, Ireland
- Died: 10 February 1974 (aged 91); Dalkey, County Dublin, Ireland
- Spouse: Joseph Samuel Young (m. 1902; died 1958)

Edith Mary Young (née O'Connor; 10 September 1882 – 10 February 1974) was an Irish suffragist organiser and activist.

== Early life and family ==
Young was born Edith Mary O'Connor was born on 10 September 1882 at 4 Pilot's Cottages, Harbour Road (present-day Bullock Harbour) in Dalkey, County Dublin to John O'Connor, a clerk in the Four Courts, and Lizzey O'Connor (née Morrisy). Raised in a Catholic household, O'Connor was living in Dublin by 1902. On 25 November 1902, O'Connor married Joseph Samuel Young (c. 1864–1958), a Protestant mineral-water manufacturer, at St. George's Church in Dublin. Following the marriage, Young lived in Galway.

== Suffrage activism ==
Young was involved in various groups from her time in Galway, by 1911 publicly a member of the Irish Women's Franchise League. Her husband was an Urban District Councillor and Young worked to secure supporting resolutions for the 1911 parliamentary conciliation bill. Young's husband spoke in council against the system which allowed women to pay rates but denied them a vote in national elections while any man, rate payer or not, was entitled to one. The local solution was to endorse the women's vote if they qualified through property values of a minimum of £10 and as long as they were not married.

Galway suffragists were considered conservative and middle class which spoke to their preferred solutions despite being mobilized by this typically more militant group. The support died away somewhat when the conciliation bill failed and these more militant suffragists began using illegal methods of activism. Young established a non militant suffragist society in Galway representing the more moderate wing. She was elected president of the Connaught Women's Franchise League, part of the Irish Women's Suffrage Federation. The organisation concentrated on education and propaganda through newspapers and monthly meetings. Young held these in her home. They convinced opposing newspapers to give them regular space for coverage of the issues including papers by the members read at the society meetings. Young often shared the platform with leading English suffragists such as Christabel Pankhurst.

== Other concerns ==
In 1914 the group protested education bills which included unequal pay for women teachers and did not provide for women inspectors for the girls schools. Young believed in the broader feminist sphere than just working for the vote and worked on the committee for the Women's National Health Association with Lady Aberdeen. Young performed on stage and was known for her involvement in the arts, usually through fund raising and charity work. During the First World War the women's vote took a back seat to supporting the war effort and Young was active in the Galway War Fund Association. She remained a prominent worker for charities and social activism. In 1920 Young became the first woman to be elected as a Poor Law Guardian in the city. She remained in Galway until some years after her husband's death in the 1958.

In the late 1960s, Young settled in Northumberland Road, Dublin. On 10 February 1974, Young died from heart failure at Our Lady's Manor in Dalkey.
