= Cissie Cahalan =

Irish suffragette

- Born: 1876
- Died: 27 August 1948 (aged 71–72)
- Occupation: Shop worker
- Known for: Activism as trade unionist, feminist, and suffragette

Cissie Cahalan (1876 – 27 August 1948) was an Irish trade unionist, feminist, and suffragette.

== Biography ==
Cahalan was born in either Cork or Tipperary, and was the daughter of a school teacher. She worked in shops in the city of Dublin, mostly at the department store chain Arnotts. Cahalan participated in several activist movements. She was a member of the Irish Drapers' Assistants' Association (IDAA), and also the Irish Women's Franchise League (IWFL), beginning in 1908. Cahalan was described as one of the only women from a working-class background to have a major role in the Irish suffragette movement.

In 1912 she headed the "Ladies Committee" of the Dublin branch of the IDAA, and also was a contributor to the journal run by the union. In the same year, she sought the support of the Dublin Trades' Council for women's suffrage, in her role as a delegate of the IWFL. Cahalan was on the executive committee of the IWFL from 1917–1918. At some point she also served as the secretary of the Irish Women's Franchise League. Also in 1917, she went to the Irish Trades Union Congress as a delegate of the IDAA. She led a strike at Arnotts while she worked there, and succeeded in winning a 30% pay increase. Cahalan served as president of the IDAA three times, being elected in 1922, 1923, and 1924. As a part of the IDAA, she successfully campaigned for a minimum wage. From 1922 to 1923 she was also on the executive committee of the IDAA, but resigned in protest, citing the union's lack of action on imprisonment.

She continued to work at her day job alongside her activist work until 1932, and also worked part-time at St Ultan's Hospital. She went on writing for the union journal in the 1930s. She was married to John Burns in 1932; Burns died four years later. She was a close friend of Irish nationalist and fellow suffragette Hanna Sheehy-Skeffington. She died on 27 August 1948.

== Views ==
Cahalan had a well publicized debate with fellow suffragist Louie Bennett in 1919, over the subject of membership in trade unions. The debate took place in the form of writings in the newspaper The Irish Citizen. While Bennet advocated for separate unions for women, Cahalan was in favor of mixed unions, and placed the responsibility on women for failing to rise to positions of authority. Cahalan also argued that segregated unions would provide owners with a tool when disputes arose. In an article in The Irish Citizen Cahalan acknowledged that women's entry into unions had led to antagonism from male workers due to lower wages. However, she argued that:

Women have allowed themselves to be used by the capitalists as a means of lowering the standard of wages. If women demanded equal pay for equal work we should not have had this antagonism.

A staunch opponent of the First World War, Cahalan also saw it as an opportunity to improve working conditions for women, and joined the Women’s Employment Committee. She also believed in trade unions being open to all workers (including both men and women), and campaigned for equal pay for all workers.
