= Angela Russell (doctor) =

Irish physician and social reformer

- Born: Angela Gertrude Coyne; 15 November 1893; Tralee, County Kerry, Ireland
- Died: 2 March 1991 (aged 97); Rathgar, Dublin

Angela Russell (15 November 1893 – 2 March 1991) was an Irish physician and social reformer.

== Early life and family ==
Angela Russell was born Angela Gertrude Coyne in Tralee, County Kerry on 15 November 1893. Her parents were James Aloysius, an inspector of national schools, and Kathleen Mary Coyne (née Pitt). She was the seventh of nine children, with three sisters and six brothers. She attended the Ursuline convent, Waterford, and Loreto College, St Stephen's Green, Dublin. She entered University College Dublin in 1915 to study medicine. In 1921 she graduated with MB, BCh, BAO, going on to complete the Diploma in Public Health (DPH) in 1928.

She met Matthew Russell while studying for her DPH, he was a lecturer on the course, and they married at St Mary's church, Haddington Road, Dublin on 31 July 1924. The couple had three children, a daughter and two sons. Joan, their daughter, died in her twenties and inspired the poem Joan Russell by Patrick Kavanagh who was in love with her. Their sons became a Jesuit priest, and a barrister and civil servant. She was widowed in 1956. Russell died on 2 March 1991, in her home in Rathgar, Dublin.

== Career ==
Russell never entered private medical practice, going on to be a prominent member of a number of women's social reform movements from the 1930s to the 1960s. These organisations included National Council of Women of Ireland, the Women's National Health Association, and the Irish branches of Save the Children and the National Society for the Prevention of Cruelty to Children. She served as joint honorary secretary of the Joint Committee of Women's Societies and Social Workers (JCWSSW) with Winifred O'Hegarty. JCWSSW was established in 1935 to respond to the Irish government's failure to implement the Carrigan committee on sexual abuse and prostitution in Irish society recommendations. The report by the committee had been circulated to the cabinet in December 1931, and was buried by first the Fianna Fáil government in 1932 and later by the Geoghegan committee in 1933. In December 1935, Russell was part of the delegation from the JCWSSW which met with Patrick Ruttledge, minister for justice, to protest at the government's failure to act on the committee report. Members of JCWSSW were also active in attended law courts when cases against women and children were heard, and visited reformatories to report on improvements that could be made to them. Russell appeared frequently as a contributor on newspaper and radio programmes speaking about medical issues, possibly at the encouragement of her brother-in-law, John MacDonagh, a productions officer at Radio Éireann.

Like her medical contemporaries, such as Ella Webb and Kathleen Lynn, Russell was a supporter of St Ultan's, the hospital for infants. Like the medical staff of St Ultan's, Russell believed that women needed to be educated in medical matters to improve the health of Irish women and children generally, stating that "public ignorance was mainly responsible for public ill-health". She held many traditional views, such as the importance of the role of women as primarily homemakers, lecturing widely on the topic, she also advocated for an adaptive workplace that would accommodate the needs of family life. From 1946 to 1974, she was a member of the central council of the Irish Red Cross, and served on the Junior Red Cross and the national geriatrics committees of the society from 1953 to the early 1980s. Russell was a member of the Commission on Itinerancy, which reported in 1963. She also served as chair of Cheeverstown Convalescent Home for Children, and on the Board of the Meath Hospital.

The Royal College of Physicians of Ireland hold a small collection from the Russells of ephemera relating to public health, presented by their sons.
