= The Irish Worker =

- Type: Political Newspaper
- Publisher: ITGWU; Irish Worker League
- Editor: James Larkin; James Connolly
- Founded: 1911
- Ceased publication: 1932
- Political alignment: Left Wing
- Language: English

The Irish Worker was a newspaper produced by James Larkin, initially edited by Larkin and published in 1911 as The Irish Worker and Peoples' Advocate, it was suppressed in August 1914. James Connolly edited the paper when Larkin was in jail during the 1913 Dublin Lock-out. Many public figures and writers featured in the paper, like the actor Andrew Wilson who was sub-editor, the journalist and historian Standish O'Grady and playwright Seán O'Casey whose early writings were published in the paper. The artist Ernest Kavanagh provided cartoons for the paper. The Irish Worker was relaunched in 1923 following Larkin's return to Ireland. It was used to launch his political party Irish Worker League.

The last edition of The Irish Worker was published in March, 1932.
