= The Siege: The Saga of Israel and Zionism =

1986 book by Conor Cruise O'Brien

- Author: Conor Cruise O'Brien
- Language: English
- Genre: Non-fiction
- Publication date: 1986

The Siege: The Saga of Israel and Zionism is a 1986 book of Israeli political history by Irish author Conor Cruise O'Brien.

== Synopsis ==
The book examines the history of Zionism and the state of Israel.

== Release ==
The Siege was first published in hardcover in the United States during 1986 through Touchstone Books, an imprint of Simon & Schuster, and received a paperback release the following year. It was reprinted in 2015 through Faber Finds.

The book was translated into German in 1991 and published by Deutscher Taschenbuch Verlag.

== Reception ==
The Siege received reviews upon its release, with common elements of praise focusing on O'Brien's research, which took him to Israel. The Siege received a positive review from Chaim Potok, who noted that "It is fascinating to me that an Irish diplomat would attempt - and successfully bring off- such a book." Abba Eban reviewed the tome for The Los Angeles Times, calling it "impressive reading".

It was also reviewed for The Star-Ledger, where Roger Harris praised O'Brien for his research into the topic and for "writing history, not making an argument."
