= Kate Cruise O'Brien =

Irish poet (1948–1998)

Katherine Alexandra Cruise O'Brien (26 May 1948 – 26 March 1998) was an Irish writer.

The third and youngest child of Irish politician and diplomat Conor Cruise O'Brien and Christine Foster, she was born in Dublin, and grew up in Howth. She went to school in Dublin and studied English at Trinity College Dublin. Her mother, Christine Foster, was born in Derry and was raised in Belfast. Christine's father, Alec Foster, was headmaster of Belfast Royal Academy, and played international rugby for Ireland and the British and Irish Lions.

While still at university, Kate Cruise O'Brien published her first short story and shortly afterwards, at the age of 22 she won the Hennessy Literary Award. She graduated in 1971 and married Joseph Kearney, son of a former secretary to the Department of Defence. She returned to university to study for a Higher Diploma in Education. Unable to find a teaching post she started a small nursery for the children of working mothers.

Her first book, A Gift Horse, a collection of short stories, won her the Rooney Prize for Irish Literature. Seán Ó Faoláin described it as containing "the seed of genius". She later became a literary editor with the Poolbeg Press, and became well known for her canny knack for uncovering new talent.

== Personal life ==
In 1971, she married Joseph Kearney; the couple had one child. Kate Cruise O'Brien died suddenly in 1998 in Dublin.

== Works ==
- A Gift Horse, and Other Stories (1977), Poolbeg Press
- The Homesick Garden (1991), Poolbeg Press
- If Only: Short Stories of Love and Divorce (1997), Poolbeg Press (co-editor)
- In Sunshine Or in Shadow (1999), Poolbeg Press (co-editor)
