= Conor Cruise O'Brien =

Irish politician, writer, historian and academic (1917–2008)

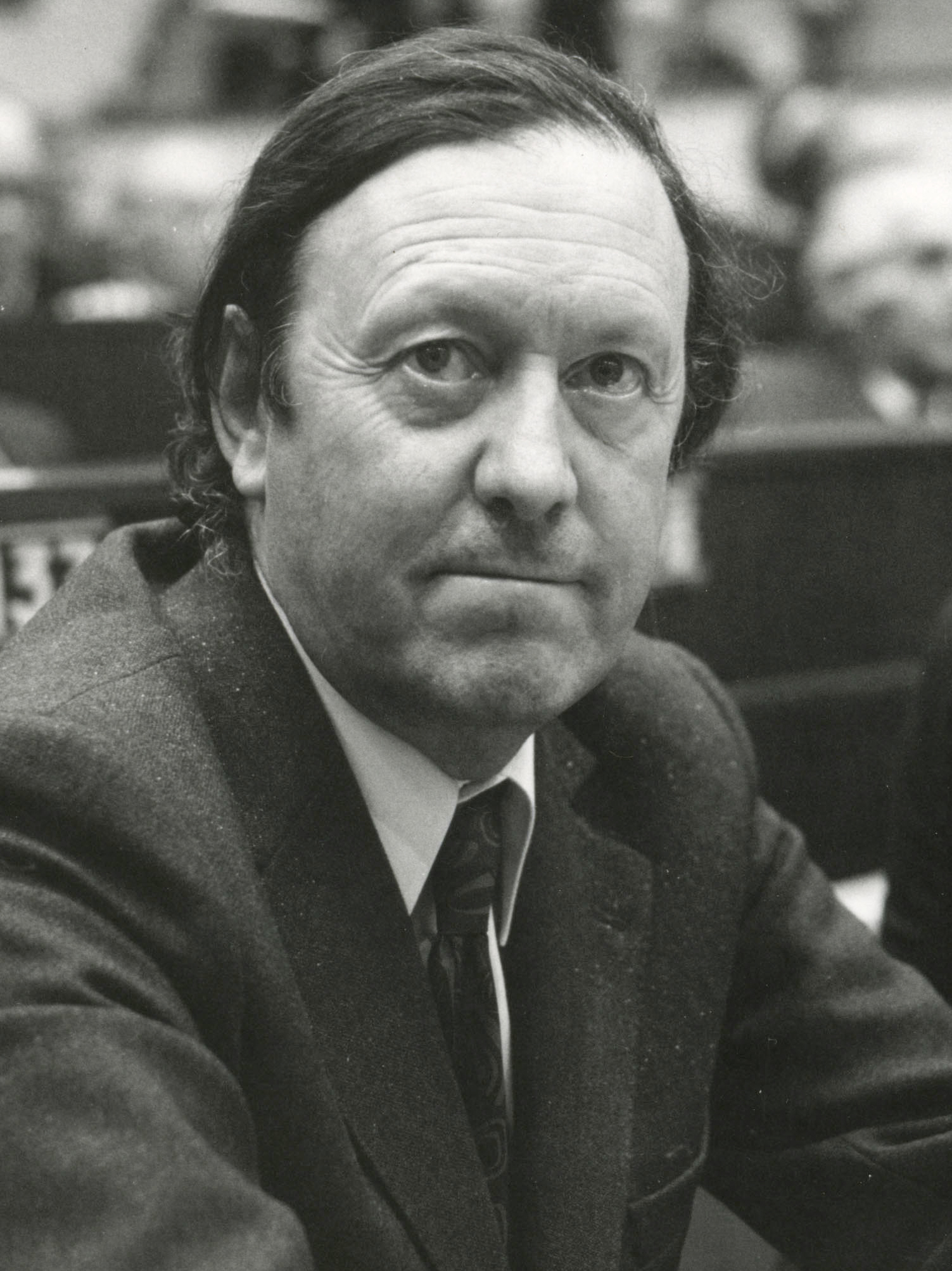
- Cruise O'Brien in 1973

Member of the Northern Ireland Forum
- In office 30 May 1996 – 25 April 1998
- Constituency: Top-up list

Minister for Posts and Telegraphs
- In office 14 March 1973 – 5 July 1977
- Taoiseach: Liam Cosgrave
- Preceded by: Gerry Collins
- Succeeded by: Pádraig Faulkner

Senator
- In office 27 October 1977 – 13 June 1979
- Constituency: Dublin University

Teachta Dála
- In office June 1969 – June 1977
- Constituency: Dublin North-East

Member of the European Parliament
- In office 1 January 1973 – 23 March 1973
- Constituency: Oireachtas

Vice-Chancellor of the University of Ghana
- In office 1962–1965
- Preceded by: Raymond Henry Stoughton
- Succeeded by: Alexander Kwapong

Personal details
- Born: Donal Conor David Dermot Donat Cruise O'Brien; 3 November 1917 Rathmines, Dublin, Ireland
- Died: 18 December 2008 (aged 91) Howth, Dublin, Ireland
- Party: Labour Party
- Other political affiliations: UK Unionist Party (1996–1998)
- Spouses: Christine Foster (m. 1939; div. 1959) Máire Mhac an tSaoi (m. 1962)
- Relations: David Sheehy (grandfather); Owen Sheehy-Skeffington (cousin)
- Children: 5, including Kate
- Education: Trinity College Dublin

Donal Conor David Dermot Donat Cruise O'Brien (3 November 1917 – 18 December 2008), often nicknamed "The Cruiser", was an Irish diplomat, politician, writer, historian and academic, who served as Minister for Posts and Telegraphs from 1973 to 1977, a Senator for Dublin University from 1977 to 1979, a Teachta Dála (TD) for the Dublin North-East constituency from 1969 to 1977, and a Member of the European Parliament (MEP) from January 1973 to March 1973.

His opinion of Britain's role in Ireland subsequent to the partition of the island and the independence of the Free State in 1921 changed during the 1970s, in response to the outbreak of The Troubles. He now saw opposing nationalist and unionist traditions as irreconcilable, and switched from a nationalist to a unionist view of Irish politics and history, and from opposition to support for partition. O'Brien's outlook was radical and seldom orthodox. He summarised his position as intending "to administer an electric shock to the Irish psyche".

Internationally, though a long-standing member of the Irish Anti-Apartheid Movement, he opposed in person the African National Congress's academic boycott of the apartheid regime in South Africa. Views that he espoused during and after the 1970s contrasted with those he articulated during the 1950s and 1960s.

During his 1945–1961 career as a civil servant, O'Brien promoted the government's anti-partition campaign. In the 1960s he was associated with the 'New Left' and opposition to US military involvement in Vietnam. At the 1969 general election he was elected to Dáil Éireann as a Labour Party TD for Dublin North-East. He served as Minister for Posts and Telegraphs, with responsibility for broadcasting, between 1973 and 1977 in a coalition government. During those years he was also the Labour Party's Northern Ireland spokesman. O'Brien was later known primarily as an author and as an Irish Independent and Sunday Independent columnist.

== Early life ==
Conor Cruise O'Brien was born at 44 Leinster Road, Rathmines, Dublin, to Francis ("Frank") Cruise O'Brien and the former Kathleen Sheehy. Frank was a journalist with the Freeman's Journal and Irish Independent newspapers, and had edited an essay written 50 years earlier by William Lecky concerning the influence of the clergy on Irish politics. Kathleen was a teacher of the Irish language. She was the daughter of David Sheehy, a member of the Irish Parliamentary Party and organiser of the Irish National Land League. She had three sisters, Hanna, Margaret and Mary. Hanna's husband, the well-known pacifist and supporter of women's suffrage Francis Sheehy-Skeffington, was executed by firing squad on the orders of Captain J.C Bowen Colthurst during the 1916 Easter Rising. Soon afterwards Mary's husband, Tom Kettle, an officer of the Royal Dublin Fusiliers in the First World War, was killed during the Battle of the Somme. These women, Hanna and Kathleen in particular, were a major influence on O'Brien's upbringing, alongside Hanna's son, Owen Sheehy-Skeffington.

O'Brien's father died in 1927. He wanted Conor educated, like Conor's cousin Owen, in Sandford Park School that had a predominantly Protestant ethos, a wish Kathleen honoured. despite objections from Catholic clergy. O'Brien subsequently attended Trinity College Dublin, which played the British national anthem until 1939. While others stood, he and Sheehy-Skeffington sat in protest on such occasions. O'Brien was elected a scholar in Modern Languages at Trinity in 1937 and was editor of Trinity's weekly, TCD: A College Miscellany.

His first wife, Christine Foster, from a Belfast Presbyterian family, was, like her father, a member of the Gaelic League. Her parents, Alexander (Alec) Roulston Foster and Anne (Annie) Lynd, were, in O'Brien's description, "Home Rulers; a very advanced position for any Protestants in the period". Alec Foster was at the time headmaster of Belfast Royal Academy; he was later a founding member of the Wolfe Tone Society, and was a strong supporter of the Irish Anti-Apartheid Movement. He was a former Ulster, Ireland and British & Irish Lions rugby player, having captained Ireland three times between 1912 and 1914. O'Brien and Christine Foster were married in a registry office in 1939. The couple had three children: Donal, Fedelma, and Kathleen (Kate), who died in 1998. The marriage ended in divorce after 20 years.

In 1962, O'Brien married the Irish-language writer and poet Máire Mhac an tSaoi in a Roman Catholic church. O'Brien's divorce was not an issue because that church did not recognise the validity of his 1939 civil wedding. He referred to this action, which in effect formally de-recognised the legitimacy of his former wife and their children, as "hypocritical ... and otherwise distasteful, but I took it, as preferable to the alternatives". Mac an tSaoi was five years his junior, and the daughter of Seán MacEntee, who was Tánaiste (deputy prime minister) at the time. The couple subsequently adopted two children of Irish-African parentage, a son (Patrick) and a daughter (Margaret).

== Department of External Affairs ==
O'Brien's university education led to a career in the public service, most notably in the Department of External Affairs. He achieved distinction as managing director of the state-run Irish News Agency and later as part of the fledgling Irish delegation to the United Nations. He later claimed he was something of an anomalous iconoclast in post-1922 Irish politics, particularly in the context of Fianna Fáil governments under Éamon de Valera.

O'Brien wrote that the Secretary of the department, Joseph P. Walshe, might well have considered that O'Brien was "no fit person to be a member of Catholic Ireland's Department of External Affairs". O'Brien attributed his appointment "to a decision taken at a higher level. Under God, there was only one higher level. This consisted of Eamon de Valera, then Minister for External Affairs as well as Taoiseach." O'Brien speculated that de Valera's Catholicism may have been conditioned by his excommunication during the Civil War of 1922/3, that he may have felt that Walshe had been too close to the previous government, and that he may have been conscious of the nationalist credentials of the Sheehy family, notably O'Brien's great-uncle, Father Eugene Sheehy, who had been parish priest of Bruree during de Valera's formative years. De Valera later wrote of Father Sheehy, "Eisean a mhúin an tírgrá dhom" (It was he who taught me patriotism).

O'Brien wrote of his entry into the public service: "The time when I joined the Department of Finance was the first time, since my First Communion, that I found myself in a working environment which was mainly – indeed almost entirely – Catholic". As he admitted, his non-belief did not impede his career, which ended at ambassadorial level. He observed,

There was nothing unusual even then about not believing in Catholicism. What was unusual then was to acknowledge publicly that you did not believe in Catholicism ... It is interesting that this did absolutely no harm to my public career around the mid-century – a time when the authority of a triumphant Catholic Church appeared to be overwhelmingly strong, in the media and in public life. But I think many educated people – including many in the public service – already resented that authority and, while being discreet about this themselves, had some respect for a person who publicly rejected it altogether.

In the Department of External Affairs, during the 1948–1951 inter-party government, he served under Seán MacBride, son of John MacBride and Maud Gonne, republican and former IRA Chief of Staff. O'Brien was particularly vocal in opposition to partition during the 1940s and 1950s, as part of his official duties.

== Secondment in Congo ==
He came to prominence in 1961, after his secondment from Ireland's UN delegation as a special representative to Dag Hammarskjöld, Secretary General of the United Nations, in the Katanga region of the newly independent Congo (now the Democratic Republic of the Congo). O'Brien accused a combination of British, French and white Rhodesian elements of attempting to partition off Katanga as a pro-Western client state. He used military force to oppose a combination of western mercenaries and Katangan forces.

O'Brien arrived in Élisabethville (modern Lubumbashi) on 14 June 1961, making him the UN's point man for dealing with Moïse Tshombe, the leader of the self-proclaimed independent État du Katanga. The Kasaï Baluba people who formed the majority of the people in northern Katanga were solid supporters of a united Congo, and were the subjects of a ruthless campaign of repression waged by the white mercenaries hired by Tshombe, together with the Katangese gendarmerie. The UN refugee camps were soon overcrowded with thousands of Kasai Baluba people who fled into the refugee camps for their safety. From the viewpoint of O'Brien and other UN personnel, the sooner the crisis was ended, the sooner the refugees could go home. On 28 August 1961, Operation Rum Punch was launched to remove the mercenaries from Katanga as the first step towards reintegrating Katanga into the Congo. On 11 September, Mahmoud Khiary, the chief of the UN mission, gave O'Brien orders to arrest several leading figures within the Etat du Katanga. On 13 September 1961, Operation Morthor was launched, which led O'Brien to assert prematurely at a press conference that the secession of Katanga was at an end. Tshombe was ordered to be arrested, but he was able to escape via the British consul in Élisabethville to the British colony of Northern Rhodesia (modern Zambia) from whence he returned to Katanga.

=== Siege of Jadotville ===
In September 1961, a company of 155 Irish UN troops ("A" Company, 35th Battalion, Irish Army), was surrounded by a force of heavily armed Gendarmerie and mercenaries outnumbering them 20-to-one in Jadotville. The Irish soldiers, many of them still in their teens, were lightly armed, short of ammunition and supplies, and unprepared for the situation. They had been sent to the newly independent Republic of Congo on what was supposed to be a peacekeeping mission but were ordered to the offensive by the UN's most senior diplomat on the ground, O'Brien, acting on the instructions of the Secretary General, who wanted the Katanga problem solved before the upcoming United Nations General Assembly, as his career was on the line.

The Irish troops held out for six days before they ran out of bullets and drinking water. When water finally reached them, it came in old petrol cans that had not been cleaned, making it undrinkable. The troops inflicted heavy casualties on the enemy force but suffered no fatalities themselves. After their surrender, they spent just over one month in captivity unsure of their fate, and when they arrived back in Ireland, were dismayed and deeply hurt to learn that the UN and their own government were anxious to sweep the episode under the carpet to protect the reputation and to conceal the failures of the UN in preparing for combat and liberating Company A.

O'Brien wrote immediately about his experiences in The Observer of London and in The New York Times on 10 and 17 December 1961. Armed with the archive material, one expert concluded Hammarskjöld "knew in advance that the UN was about to take action in Katanga and he authorised that action". This is contradicted in a 2022 book on the Congo crisis by historian Wilhelm Agrell.

=== Dismissal ===
Faced with the failure of Operation Morthor, Hammarskjöld was on his way to Ndola to meet Tshombe to discuss a ceasefire, but was killed when his airplane crashed during the journey. O'Brien wrote: "in Élisabethville I do not think there was anyone who believed that his death was an accident".

A UN crisis ensued, and O'Brien was forced to step down simultaneously from his UN position and the Irish diplomatic service in late 1961. He went public immediately with his version of events, writing simultaneously in The Observer (London) and the New York Times that, "My resignation from the United Nations and from the Irish foreign service is a result of British government policy".

Michael Ignatieff asserted that Hammarskjöld had misjudged O'Brien's abilities as UN representative and that O'Brien's use of military force provided the Soviets and the US with ammunition in their campaign against the UN Secretary General and against UN actions in opposition to the interests of the big powers. Faced with the complexities of the political situation of the United Nations in the Congo, O'Brien had failed to understand and in turn exceeded the authority granted to ONUC by the Secretary-General and the Security Council. Hammarskjöld first learned of the operation via press dispatch in Accra — after the operation had already begun — and his initial reaction was to dismiss the report as erroneous since it was clearly in violation of his instructions.

== Opposition to the Vietnam War ==
After O'Brien's recall from UN service and his resignation from the Irish civil service, he served as Vice-Chancellor of the University of Ghana. He resigned after he fell out with the Chancellor and President of Ghana, Kwame Nkrumah, in 1965. He was initially sympathetic towards Nkrumah, who won Ghana's independence from the British empire in 1957, but fell out with him due to his authoritarianism and his promotion of the ideology of 'Nkrumahism', in which all Ghanaians were expected to believe. O'Brien sought to protect academic freedom against Nkrumahism, saying in a speech before the students of the University of Ghana that all intellectuals have a duty to promote the truth and that "These are not European values; these are universal values."

He was then appointed Albert Schweitzer Professor of Humanities at New York University, a position he held until 1969. During the 1960s O'Brien was an active opponent of US involvement in Vietnam. He supported the right of the Vietnamese people to use violence against US armed forces. At a 1967 Vietnam War symposium O'Brien clashed with Hannah Arendt, who had remarked, "As to the Viet Cong terror, we cannot possibly agree with it". O'Brien responded, "I think there is a distinction between the use of terror by oppressed peoples against the oppressors and their servants, in comparison with the use of terror by their oppressors in the interests of further oppression. I think there is a qualitative distinction there which we have the right to make."

Besides the Vietnam War, O'Brien opposed what he saw as the overtly too passive opposition of the U.S. government to the white supremacist governments of Rhodesia and South Africa, charging that all the reaction the U.S. government ever made was to politely deplore the policies of the two governments. In September 1967, he flew to the self-proclaimed Republic of Biafra to express his support for Igbo separatism. In articles in The Observer and The New York Review of Books, he argued that there were important differences between the Republic of Biafra and the State of Katanga, and that there was no equivalence between the two breakaway states. He argued that Biafra represented the sincere wish of the Igbo people to leave Nigeria, while Katanga was a sham.

In December 1967, O'Brien was front-page news in The Irish Times, which reported his arrest while demonstrating against the war in New York, and his being kicked by a policeman. He joked about the policeman who assaulted him: "no prizes for guessing his ethnicity". In 1968, he campaigned for Senator Eugene McCarthy who sought the Democratic nomination in the presidential election of that year on a platform of ending the Vietnam War. In May of that year, O'Brien condemned police attacks on and harassment of the militant, armed, Black Panther Party.

Between January and March 1969, he offered refuge at his home in Howth to German socialist student leader, and anti-Vietnam War activist, Rudi Dutschke and his wife Gretchen. In April the previous year Dutschke had been shot and badly injured by a right-wing assassin in West Berlin, but was subsequently denied visas by a number of European countries, including Britain. During their stay, the Dutschkes were visited by their lawyer Horst Mahler, who tried and failed to persuade them to support him underground in the group that was to become the Red Army Faction (the "Baader Meinhof Gang").

== Irish politics ==
O'Brien returned to Ireland and in the 1969 general election was elected to Dáil Éireann as a member of the opposition Labour Party in Dublin North-East, taking the second of that constituency's four seats behind Fianna Fáil Minister for Finance Charles Haughey, whose probity in financial matters he questioned. He was appointed a member of the short-lived first delegation from the Oireachtas to the European Parliament. After the 1973 general election, Fine Gael and Labour formed a coalition government under Taoiseach Liam Cosgrave, in which O'Brien was appointed as Minister for Posts and Telegraphs.

After the outbreak of armed conflict in Northern Ireland in 1969, O'Brien developed a deep hostility to militant Irish republicanism and to Irish nationalists generally in Northern Ireland, which reversed the views that he articulated at the outset of the unrest. He also reversed his opposition to broadcasting censorship imposed by the previous government, by extending and vigorously enforcing censorship of Raidió Teilifís Éireann (RTÉ) under Section 31 of the Broadcasting Act. In 1976, he specifically banned spokespersons for Sinn Féin and the Provisional Irish Republican Army from RTÉ. At the same time, he unsuccessfully attempted to have Britain's BBC 1 broadcast on Ireland's proposed second television channel, instead of allowing RTÉ to run it.

Two additional notable incidents affected O'Brien's career as minister, besides his support for broadcasting censorship. In August 1976, Bernard Nossiter of The Washington Post interviewed him on the passage of an Emergency Powers Bill. During the course of the interview, O'Brien revealed an intention to extend censorship beyond broadcasting. He wished to "cleanse the culture" of republicanism and said that he would like the bill to be used against teachers who allegedly glorified Irish revolutionaries. He also wanted it used against newspaper editors who published pro-republican or anti-British readers' letters. O'Brien mentioned The Irish Press as a newspaper against which he particularly hoped to use the legislation against and produced a file of Irish Press letters to the editor to which he took exception. Nossiter immediately informed The Irish Press editor Tim Pat Coogan of O'Brien's intentions. Coogan printed Nossiter's report (as did The Irish Times), republished the letters to which O'Brien objected and ran a number of strong editorials attacking O'Brien and the proposed legislation. The interview caused huge controversy and resulted in the modification of the measure appearing to target newspapers.

O'Brien also supported Garda Síochána brutality from 1973 to 1977, but that was not revealed by O'Brien until 1998 in his Memoir. In Memoir: My Life and Themes, O'Brien recalled a conversation with a detective who told him how the Gardaí had found out from a suspect the location of businessman Tiede Herrema, who had been kidnapped by group of maverick republicans in October 1975: "the escort started asking him questions and when at first he refused to answer, they beat the shit out of him. Then he told them where Herrema was"."/ O'Brien explained, "I refrained from telling this story to [ministerial colleagues] Garret [FitzGerald] or Justin [Keating], because I thought it would worry them. It didn't worry me". Elements of the Garda that engaged in beating false confessions out of suspects quickly became known as the "Heavy Gang".

O'Brien's constituency was re-drawn as part of his Labour colleague James Tully's attempt as Minister for Local Government to design boundaries in the electoral interests of the coalition partners. The plan backfired. In the 1977 general election, he stood in Dublin Clontarf and was one of three ministers (the others being Justin Keating and Patrick Cooney) defeated in a rout of the outgoing administration. He was subsequently elected to Seanad Éireann in 1977 for the Dublin University constituency. He was dropped as Labour's Northern Ireland spokesperson. O'Brien resigned his seat in 1979 because of new commitments as editor-in-chief of The Observer newspaper in London.

== Editor-in-Chief at The Observer ==
Between 1978 and 1981, O'Brien was editor-in-chief of The Observer newspaper in Britain. In 1979 he refused to publish an Observer article by Mary Holland, the paper's Ireland correspondent. Holland, whose reporting won her a Journalist of the Year award, had been one of the first journalists to explain discrimination in Northern Ireland to a British audience. The article was a profile of Mary Nelis of Derry and dealt with her radicalisation as a result of the conflict. O'Brien objected and sent Holland a memo stating that the "killing strain" of Irish republicanism "has a very high propensity to run in families and the mother is most often the carrier". The memo continued, "It is a very serious weakness of your coverage of Irish affairs that you are a very poor judge of Irish Catholics. That gifted and talkative community includes some of the most expert conmen and conwomen in the world and I believe you have been conned". Holland was forced out of the newspaper by O'Brien. She later joined The Irish Times as a columnist. She also rejoined The Observer after O'Brien's departure in 1981.

== Unionism ==
In 1985, O'Brien supported unionist objections to the inter-governmental Anglo-Irish Agreement. In 1996 he joined Robert McCartney's United Kingdom Unionist Party (UKUP) and was elected to the Northern Ireland Forum. In 1997, a successful libel action was brought against him by relatives of Bloody Sunday victims for alleging in a Sunday Independent article in 1997 that the marchers were "Sinn Féin activists operating for the IRA".

O'Brien opposed the 1998 Good Friday Agreement and opposed allowing Sinn Féin into government in Northern Ireland. He wrote that he was "glad to be an ally ... in defence of the Union" with the Reverend Ian Paisley, leader of the Free Presbyterian Church and of the Democratic Unionist Party. In 1968 O'Brien had referred to Paisley as a "hate merchant". He also predicted, mistakenly, that Paisley would not enter a power-sharing government with Sinn Féin. O'Brien later resigned from the UKUP after his book Memoir: My Life and Themes called on Unionists to consider the benefits of a united Ireland in order to thwart Sinn Féin. In 2005 he rejoined the Irish Labour Party. O'Brien defended his harsh attitudes and actions towards Irish republicans, saying "We do right to condemn all violence but we have a special duty to condemn the violence which is committed in our name".

== Writings ==
O'Brien's books include: States of Ireland (1972), where he first indicated his revised view of Irish nationalism, The Great Melody (1992), his 'thematic' biography of Edmund Burke, and his autobiography Memoir: My Life and Themes (1999). He also published a collection of essays, Passion and Cunning (1988), which includes a substantial piece on the literary work of W. B. Yeats and some challenging views on the subject of terrorism, and The Siege: The Saga of Israel and Zionism (1986), a history of Zionism and the State of Israel. His books, particularly those on Irish issues, tend to be personalised, for example States of Ireland, where he made the link between the political success of the republican Easter Rising and the consequent demise of his Home Rule family's position in society. His private papers have been deposited in the University College Dublin Archives.

In 1963, O'Brien's script for a Telefís Éireann programme on Charles Stewart Parnell won him a Jacob's Award.

He was a longtime columnist for the Irish Independent. His articles were distinguished by hostility to the Northern Ireland peace process, regular predictions of civil war involving the Republic of Ireland, and a pro-Unionist stance.

O'Brien held visiting professorships and lectureships throughout the world, particularly in the United States, and in apartheid South Africa, openly breaking the academic boycott. A persistent critic of Charles Haughey, O'Brien coined the acronym GUBU (Grotesque, Unbelievable, Bizarre and Unprecedented), based on a statement by Charles Haughey, who was then Taoiseach, commenting on the discovery of a murder suspect, Malcolm MacArthur, in the apartment of the Fianna Fáil Attorney General Patrick Connolly. Until 1994, O'Brien was a Pro-Chancellor of the University of Dublin.

== Bibliography ==
- Maria Cross: Imaginative Patterns in a Group of Modern Catholic Writers (as Donat O'Donnell) (London: Chatto & Windus, 1952) OCLC 7884093
- Parnell and His Party 1880–90 (Oxford: Clarendon Press, 1957) ISBN 978-0-19-821237-9 (1968 edition)
- The Shaping of Modern Ireland (London: Routledge & Kegan Paul, 1960)
- To Katanga and Back: A UN Case History (London: Hutchinson, 1962) OCLC 460615937
- Writers and Politics: Essays & Criticism (London: Chatto & Windus, 1965) ISBN 978-0-14-002733-4 (1976 Penguin edition)
- Introduction and notes to Edmund Burke's Reflections on the Revolution in France (London: Penguin Books, 1968, 2004) ISBN 978-0-140-43204-6
- Murderous Angels: A Political Tragedy and Comedy in Black and White (play) (Boston: Little, Brown, 1968) OCLC 449739
- The United Nations: Sacred Drama with illustrations by Feliks Topolski (London: Hutchinson, 1968) ISBN 978-0-09-085790-6
- Camus (Fontana Modern Masters, 1970) ISBN 978-0-00-211147-8 – released in US as Albert Camus of Europe and Africa (New York: Viking, 1970) ISBN 978-0-670-01902-1
- (with Máire O'Brien) A Concise History of Ireland (London: Thames & Hudson, 1972); retitled The Story of Ireland (New York: Viking, 1972)
- States of Ireland (London: Hutchinson, 1972) ISBN 978-0-09-113100-5
- The Suspecting Glance (London: Faber, 1972) ISBN 978-0-571-09543-8
- Herod: Reflections on Political Violence (London: Hutchinson, 1978) ISBN 978-0-09-133190-0
- The Siege: The Saga of Israel and Zionism (1986) ISBN 978-0-671-63310-3
- God Land: Reflections on Religion and Nationalism (Cambridge, MA: Harvard University Press, 1988) ISBN 978-0-674-35510-1
- Passion and Cunning and Other Essays (London: Weidenfeld & Nicolson, 1988) ISBN 978-0-297-79325-0
- The Great Melody: A Thematic Biography of Edmund Burke (Chicago: University of Chicago Press, 1992) ISBN 978-0-226-61651-3
- On the Eve of the Millennium (Toronto: House of Anansi Press, 1994). ISBN 978-0-88784-559-8
- The Long Affair: Thomas Jefferson and the French Revolution, 1785–1800 (Chicago: University of Chicago Press, 1996) ISBN 978-0-226-61656-8
- Ancestral Voices: Religion and Nationalism in Ireland (Dublin: Poolbeg Press, 1994) ISBN 978-1-85371-429-0
- Memoir: My Life and Themes (Dublin: Poolbeg Press, 1999) ISBN 978-1-85371-947-9

Political offices
Preceded by Gerry Collins	Minister for Posts and Telegraphs; 1973–1977	Succeeded by Pádraig Faulkner
Northern Ireland Forum
New forum	Regional Member; 1996–1998	Forum dissolved

Dáil	Election	Deputy (Party)	Deputy (Party)	Deputy (Party)	Deputy (Party)	Deputy (Party)
9th	1937	Alfie Byrne (Ind.)	Oscar Traynor (FF)	James Larkin (Ind.)	3 seats 1937–1948	
10th	1938	Alfie Byrne (Ind.)	Oscar Traynor (FF)	Richard Mulcahy (FG)	3 seats 1937–1948	
11th	1943	Alfie Byrne (Ind.)	Oscar Traynor (FF)	James Larkin (Lab)	3 seats 1937–1948	
12th	1944	Alfie Byrne (Ind.)	Oscar Traynor (FF)	Harry Colley (FF)	3 seats 1937–1948	
13th	1948	Alfie Byrne (Ind.)	Oscar Traynor (FF)	Harry Colley (FF)	Jack Belton (FG)	Peadar Cowan (CnaP)
14th	1951	Alfie Byrne (Ind.)	Oscar Traynor (FF)	Harry Colley (FF)	Jack Belton (FG)	Peadar Cowan (Ind.)
15th	1954	Alfie Byrne (Ind.)	Oscar Traynor (FF)	Harry Colley (FF)	Jack Belton (FG)	Denis Larkin (Lab)
15th	1956 by-election	Patrick Byrne (FG)	Oscar Traynor (FF)	Harry Colley (FF)	Jack Belton (FG)	Denis Larkin (Lab)
16th	1957	Patrick Byrne (FG)	Oscar Traynor (FF)	Charles Haughey (FF)	Jack Belton (FG)	Denis Larkin (Lab)
17th	1961	Patrick Byrne (FG)	George Colley (FF)	Charles Haughey (FF)	Jack Belton (FG)	Eugene Timmons (FF)
17th	1963 by-election	Patrick Byrne (FG)	George Colley (FF)	Charles Haughey (FF)	Paddy Belton (FG)	Eugene Timmons (FF)
18th	1965	Patrick Byrne (FG)	George Colley (FF)	Charles Haughey (FF)	Paddy Belton (FG)	Denis Larkin (Lab)
19th	1969	Conor Cruise O'Brien (Lab)	Eugene Timmons (FF)	Charles Haughey (FF)	Paddy Belton (FG)	4 seats 1969–1977
20th	1973	Conor Cruise O'Brien (Lab)	Eugene Timmons (FF)	Charles Haughey (FF)	Paddy Belton (FG)	4 seats 1969–1977
21st	1977	Constituency abolished				

Dáil	Election	Deputy (Party)	Deputy (Party)	Deputy (Party)	Deputy (Party)
22nd	1981	Michael Woods (FF)	Liam Fitzgerald (FF)	Seán Dublin Bay Rockall Loftus (Ind.)	Michael Joe Cosgrave (FG)
23rd	1982 (Feb)	Michael Woods (FF)	Maurice Manning (FG)	Ned Brennan (FF)	Michael Joe Cosgrave (FG)
24th	1982 (Nov)	Michael Woods (FF)	Maurice Manning (FG)	Liam Fitzgerald (FF)	Michael Joe Cosgrave (FG)
25th	1987	Michael Woods (FF)	Pat McCartan (WP)	Liam Fitzgerald (FF)	Michael Joe Cosgrave (FG)
26th	1989	Michael Woods (FF)	Pat McCartan (WP)	Liam Fitzgerald (FF)	Michael Joe Cosgrave (FG)
27th	1992	Michael Woods (FF)	Tommy Broughan (Lab)	Liam Fitzgerald (FF)	Seán Kenny (Lab)
28th	1997	Michael Woods (FF)	Tommy Broughan (Lab)	Martin Brady (FF)	Michael Joe Cosgrave (FG)
29th	2002	Michael Woods (FF)	Tommy Broughan (Lab)	Martin Brady (FF)	3 seats from 2002
30th	2007	Michael Woods (FF)	Tommy Broughan (Lab)	Terence Flanagan (FG)	3 seats from 2002
31st	2011	Seán Kenny (Lab)	Tommy Broughan (Lab)	Terence Flanagan (FG)	3 seats from 2002
32nd	2016	Constituency abolished. See Dublin Bay North			
