= Ernest Kavanagh =

Irish cartoonist

- Only surviving image of Kavanagh taken days before his death
- Born: 1884; Dublin, Ireland
- Died: 25 April 1916 (aged 31–32); Dublin
- Known for: political cartoons

Ernest Kavanagh (or Cavanagh) (1884 – 25 April 1916) was a Dublin born cartoonist who contributed to a number of political publications in the early part of the 20th century.

== Biography ==
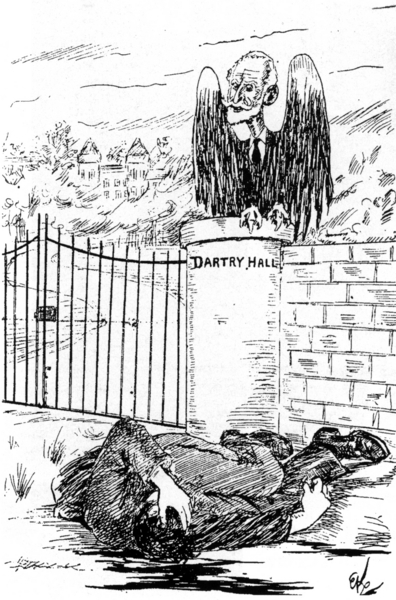
Cartoon by Kavanagh of William Martin Murphy titled The Demon of Death

Ernest Kavanagh was born in Dublin in 1884. His father, a clerk, had been a member of the Irish Republican Brotherhood. Kavanagh's cartoons were published using his initials E.K. He provided cartoons for The Irish Worker newspaper of James Larkin's Irish Transport and General Workers' Union, whilst also working as an insurance clerk in the union. He produced cartoons published alongside poems by his sister the writer and poet Maeve Cavanagh McDowell.

As well as supporting the working class, his cartoons attacked the recruitment drive for World War I and supported the suffragette movement. He contributed cartoons to the suffragette paper, The Irish Citizen, Fianna and Irish Freedom. A non-combatant, he was struck and killed by a bullet during the Easter Rising, on 25 April 1916 outside Liberty Hall. At the time of his death, he was living at 30 Oxford Road, Ranelagh.

His sister published a selection of his works after his death, in 1918. A book on his cartoons, Artist of the Revolution. The Cartoons of Ernest Kavanagh, was published in 2012. The Dublin City Library and Archive hold the one of the few original surviving drawing by Kavanagh, an unpublished work depicting Larkin shining a light on the "Dublin Labour War". The National Museum of Ireland also hold some work by Kavanagh which were taken from Liberty Hall in the aftermath of the Rising.
