= Eugene Sheehy (priest) =

Irish land rights campaigner, nationalist and priest

Father Eugene Sheehy
- Born: Eugene Sheehy; 25 December 1841; Broadford, County Limerick
- Died: July 1917 (aged 75); Dublin
- Education: Mungret College
- Alma mater: Irish College in Paris
- Occupation: Priest
- Known for: Irish National Land League

Father Eugene Sheehy (25 December 1841 – July 1917) was a priest, president of the local branch of the Irish National Land League at Kilmallock, and founder member of the Gaelic Athletic Association. He was known as the "Land League priest", and his activities landed him in prison. He educated Éamon de Valera who went on to be president of Ireland.

== Life ==
Eugene Sheehy was born in Broadford, County Limerick, Ireland, son of Richard Sheehy and Johanna Shea, brother of Mary Sheehy and David Sheehy. He was the uncle of Hanna Sheehy Skeffington and Eugene Sheehy. He was educated at Mungret College, Limerick, and later studied for the priesthood at the Irish College in Paris. He was a distant cousin of John Fitzgerald Kennedy through Kennedy's maternal Grandmother Mary Assumpta Hickey, who was descended from a member of the Sheehy family.

== Arrest ==
Sheehy was a forceful and patriotic individual whose involvement in the Land League put him in contention with the local magistrate, Clifford Lloyd. He was arrested on 20 May 1881 for his speeches and put in prison until September.

Clifford Lloyd, described the scene in his book 'Ireland under the Land League':

I shall never forget the scene as he proceeded up the street. The people fell upon their knees as he passed and seized his hands and the skirts of his clothes, while begging his blessing before he left them.

He was said to have been a member of the Irish Republican Brotherhood, may have been on its executive committee, and was certainly in the confidence of the leaders.

He was interned first in Naas Jail and later transferred to Kilmainham Gaol, where he joined Parnell, Davitt, Dillon and the other 'suspects'.

== Continued activities ==
In November 1881, Sheehy visited the United States, where his activities included the making of a speech at the Cooper's Union in New York and attending the Irish National convention in Chicago on a fund raising and awareness raising tour.

Sheehy was at the meeting in Thurles when the Gaelic Athletic Association was founded in 1884; a photograph taken on that day shows him in the group which contained Davitt, Cusack, Power and MacKay

Also in 1884, Fr. Sheehy spoke to a large crowd in Knockaderry, Limerick on the topic of Irish independence which was reported in New Zealand.

In 1886, he replaced Father James Enraght as P.P. of Bruree. That same year he went in Galway to oppose the election of Captain O'Shea and supported Parnell.

According to his niece, Hanna Sheehy Skeffington, the famous phrase attributed to Parnell and engraved on his statue was first spoken by Father Sheehy at a banquet in Cork (where Parnell and himself were photographed together). During the evening Father Sheehy said 'No man has a right to set bounds to the onward march of a nation', and Parnell was struck by the phrase and made it his own.

When "the Split" came in 1890, however, Fr. Sheehy was opposed to Parnell's leadership, in line with the position of the Catholic hierarchy.

== Later life ==
In 1900, he retired from his parish and moved to Dublin. He was in the city during the Easter Rising in 1916, and was present in the GPO, where he gave spiritual aid to the Volunteers.

There is a photo of him with his niece available at the National Library of Ireland.

He died the following year aged 76. One of his last utterances was: – 'I am sorry that I did not die with Tom Clarke.' He was buried in Glasnevin Cemetery.
