= Women's National Health Association =

Irish non-governmental organization

- Abbreviation: WNHA
- Formation: 13 March 1907; 119 years ago
- Type: NGO
- Purpose: Social conditions
- Location: Ireland
- Region served: Ireland
- Main organ: Board of directors
- Affiliations: International Council of Women

The Women's National Health Association (WNHA) was a body set up in Ireland in 1907 with the objective of eliminating, as far as possible, the scourge of tuberculosis, and to bring about a reduction in the high infant mortality rates in Ireland.

== Founding ==
The association was founded by Lady Aberdeen, wife of the Lord-Lieutenant in Ireland, Lord Aberdeen. During their second term in Ireland, from 1906 to 1915, Lady Aberdeen focused on healthcare and social well-being, subjects she had been interested in all her life. Over 170 local branches of the WNHA were formed throughout the country, initially on a County basis, and subsequently sub branches were set up in each county.

== Activities ==
The work of the association began with an exhibition on health matters, which was part of the Irish International Exhibition held in Dublin in 1907. With government help, the Association established pasteurized milk depots, built hospitals, dispensaries and sanitariums and expanded its activities to include medical and dental inspections for school children.

In 1908, Lady Aberdeen edited a three-volume work entitled Ireland’s Crusade Against Tuberculosis, which was a summary of the lectures given at the first of the WNHA Health Exhibitions. She also edited Sláinte, the journal of the WNHA from 1909 to 1915.

== Evolution of the association ==
After the arrival of the first casualties of the Great war back in Ireland, the personnel of the WHNA progressively evolved into the Red Cross and attended to the war casualties at home, founding hospitals and nursing homes.

== Notable members ==
- Mary Fleetwood Berry
- Florence Moon
- Angela Russell
- Edith Young

Nina Kilkelly, Isabel Lefroy, Marie Benner, Ethel Bond, Mary Bond, Julia Delany, Beatrice King-Harman, Lady Granard.

== See also ==
- Feminism in Ireland
