= The Irish Citizen =

Irish newspaper (1912–1920), promoted women's suffrage

- Type: Political Newspaper
- Publisher: Irish Women's Franchise League
- Founded: 1912
- Ceased publication: 1920
- Language: English

The Irish Citizen was founded in 1912 as the newspaper by the Irish Women's Franchise League (IWFL). Its first editors were Francis Sheehy-Skeffington the writer, pacifist and suffragist, and James H. Cousins who were associate members of the IWFL. Their wives Hanna Sheehy-Skeffington and Margaret Cousins had founded the IWFL in 1908 and both contributed to the newspaper. After Francis was killed in the Easter Rising, Hanna took over as editor.

According to Hanna, "The Irish Citizen was founded in May 1912 to further the cause of Woman Suffrage and Feminism in Ireland... In addition it had stood for the rights of Labour, especially the rights of women workers... we stand for the self-determination of Ireland."

Other contributors included the cartoonist Ernest Kavanagh, Margaret Connery, Maud Gonne-MacBride, Marion Duggan, Marie Johnson, Cissie Cahalan, Louie Bennett, Elizabeth McCracken (LAM Priestley) and Mary Bourke-Dowling and Lillian Metge.

It was initially a weekly eight-page publication and sold for a penny, with an annual subscription of 6 shillings and 6 pence, but later became a monthly with four pages. The paper ceased publication in September 1920.

== See also ==
- List of newspapers in the Republic of Ireland
