= Irish Women's Franchise League =

Irish suffragettes' organisation (1908–1918)

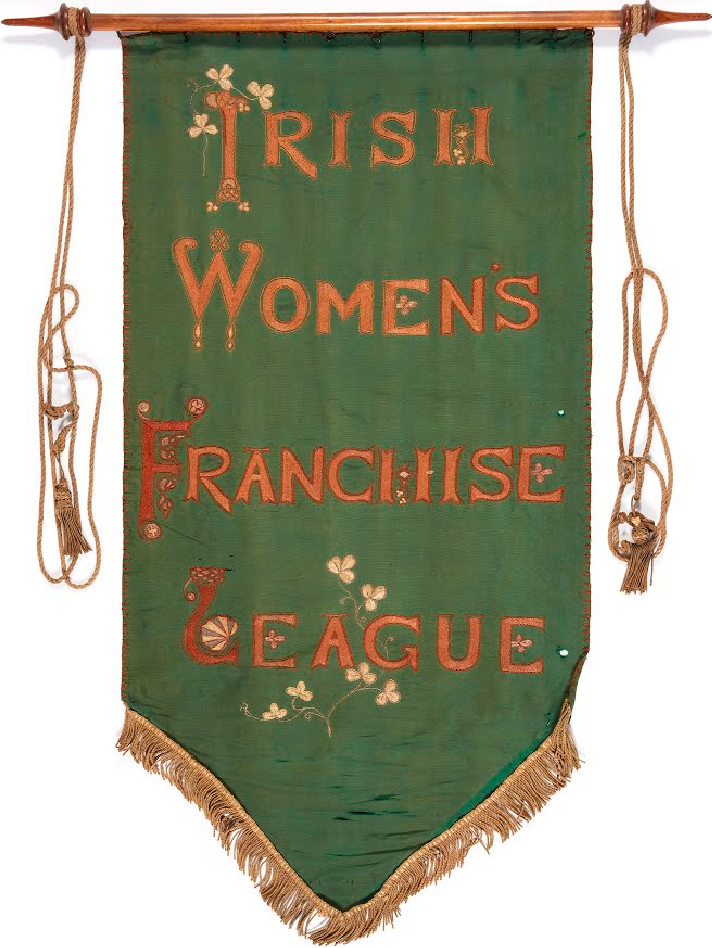
- Formation: 1908
- Founder: Hanna Sheehy-Skeffington; Francis Sheehy-Skeffington; Margaret Cousins; James Cousins
- Dissolved: 1918

The Irish Women's Franchise League was an organisation for women's suffrage which was set up in Dublin in November 1908. Its founder members included Hanna Sheehy-Skeffington, Margaret Cousins, Francis Sheehy-Skeffington and James Cousins. Thomas MacDonagh was a member.

Its paper was The Irish Citizen, which was published from 1912 to 1920. The paper was edited originally by Francis Sheehy-Skeffington and James Cousins. One of its reporters throughout was Lillian Metge, who founded the Lisburn Suffrage Society and was its president and secretary at different times.

== History ==
In the early 20th century the Irish Parliamentary Party under John Redmond and his deputy John Dillon was opposed to votes for women, as was the British prime minister, Asquith.

In November 1908, Hanna Sheehy-Skeffington and Margaret Cousins, along with their husbands Francis and James, founded the Irish Women's Franchise League.

In June 1912, after a meeting of a number of women's organisations, Hanna Sheehy-Skeffington and Margaret Cousins with six other members of the IWFL smashed government windows in the GPO and other government buildings. They were arrested, charged, and jailed. The following month Asquith came on a visit to Dublin to address a meeting in the Theatre Royal. Frank Sheehy-Skeffington managed to gain entrance and demanded votes for women before being thrown out, while Asquith's carriage was attacked by British suffragists Mary Leigh and Gladys Evans. In that attack John Redmond was injured. The British women went on hunger-strike in Mountjoy Prison, and were joined by the imprisoned Irish IWFL members in solidarity. In March 1913 a bust of John Redmond in the Royal Hibernian Academy was defaced by a suffragist protesting against the failure of the Irish Parliamentary Party to support a Women's Franchise Bill in the House of Commons. In contrast, as a mark of solidarity with the women, James Connolly travelled from Belfast to Dublin to speak at one of the IWFL's weekly meetings which was held in the Phoenix Park, and members of the ITGWU provided protection and offered escorts to women as they left the meetings.

Hanna Sheehy-Skeffington lost her teaching job in 1913 when she was arrested and put in prison for three months after throwing stones at Dublin Castle. Whilst in jail she started a hunger strike but was released under the Prisoner's Temporary Discharge of Ill Health Act and was soon rearrested.

The league kept a neutral stance on Home Rule, but was opposed to the World War. After the execution of Francis Sheehy-Skeffington by the British during the Easter Rising of 1916, it supported Sinn Féin.

IWFL never succeeded in establishing a significant presence in the north. Refusing Christabel Pankhurst's directive in August 1914, disband and cease agitation for the duration of the war, militant members of the Women Social and Political Union in Belfast, Elizabeth McCracken and Margaret McCoubrey had looked to the League. In The Irish Citizen, McCracken asked "Shall Suffrage Cease?" Men who had subjected militant suffragists to a campaign of "vituperation and invective", were now asking women to defer to "the most aggravated form of militancy—war". But McCoubrey's efforts to established a branch of the League in Belfast were bedevilled by sectarian-political differences and, with "dreams of united womanhood", were abandoned in the spring of 1915.

Following the introduction of women's suffrage in Ireland at the 1918 general election (for women over the age of 30), and the dramatic political events in Ireland that followed it, the organisation lost momentum and purpose, and was shortly defunct thereafter.

== Notable members ==
- Mrs Charles Oldham was the first president
- Hannah Sheehy Skeffington was the first secretary
- Margaret Cousins was the first treasurer
- Jennie Wyse Power joined about 1916
- Cissie Cahalan served thrice as president, and was one of the few working-class women in the movement
- Rosamond Jacob
- Marguerite Palmer, honorary secretary
- Marjorie Hasler joined in 1910, sentenced to jail for breaking windows, many consider her early death as a direct result of her imprisonment and is considered "the first Irish martyr for the suffragette cause"
- Edith Young active in the Galway branch
- Lillian Metge active in the Lisburn branch, and reporter for the Irish Citizen, was given Hunger Strike Medal after imprisonment for explosion at Lisburn Cathedral, but released without sentence as the World War One was imminent
- Patricia Hoey, the first president of the London branch of the IWFL
- Alice Litster, Irish suffragist interviewed by Brian Harrison as part of the Suffrage Interviews project, titled Oral evidence on the suffragette and suffragist movements: the Brian Harrison interviews.

== See also ==
- List of suffragists and suffragettes
- List of women's rights activists
- List of women's organizations
- Timeline of women's suffrage
- Women's suffrage organizations
