= Hanna Sheehy-Skeffington =

Irish suffragette and politician

Hanna Sheehy Skeffington
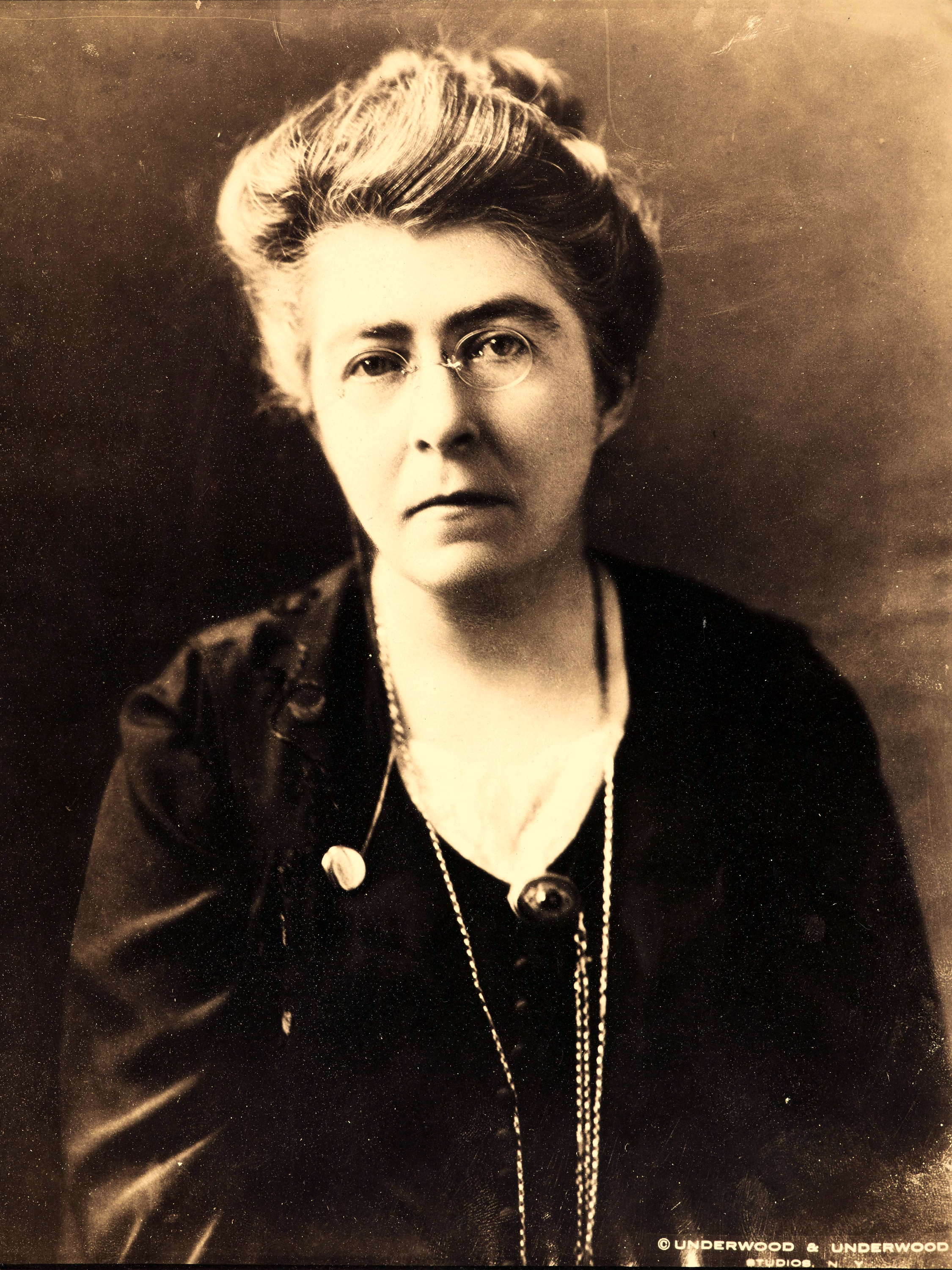
- Sheehy-Skeffington c. 1920
- Born: Johanna Mary Sheehy; 24 May 1877; Kanturk, County Cork, Ireland
- Died: 20 April 1946 (aged 68); Dublin, Ireland
- Occupations: Teacher, Activist, Politician, Author, Editor
- Known for: Suffragette and other activism
- Spouse: Francis Sheehy-Skeffington
- Children: Owen Sheehy-Skeffington

Johanna Mary Sheehy-Skeffington (née Sheehy; 24 May 1877 – 20 April 1946) was a suffragette and Irish nationalist. Along with her husband Francis Sheehy-Skeffington, Margaret Cousins and James Cousins, she founded the Irish Women's Franchise League in 1908 with the aim of obtaining women's voting rights. She was later a founding member of the Irish Women Workers' Union. Her son Owen Sheehy-Skeffington became a politician and Irish senator.

== Early life ==
Hanna Sheehy was born in Kanturk, County Cork, the daughter of Elizabeth "Bessie" McCoy and David Sheehy, an ex-Fenian who later served as an MP for the Irish Parliamentary Party representing South Galway, and she spent her earliest years in the millhouse in which her father had also grown up before the family moved to Loughmore, County Tipperary when she was three years old. She had six siblings (one of whom died at an unknown age); her brothers and sisters included Margaret (born 1875), Eugene (born 1882), Richard (born 1884), Mary (born 1884) and Kathleen (born 1886). One of her uncles, Father Eugene Sheehy, was known as "the Land League Priest" and was imprisoned for his activities, and he was later one of Éamon de Valera's teachers in Limerick.

When her father became an MP in 1887, the family moved to Hollybank in Drumcondra, Dublin, where they lived next door to the Lord Mayor of Dublin and author of "God Save Ireland", Timothy Daniel Sullivan. As a schoolgirl she was educated at the Dominican Convent on Eccles Street, where she was a prize-winning pupil, and she then enrolled at St Mary's University College to study modern languages, sitting examinations at the Royal University of Ireland and receiving a Bachelor of Arts degree in 1899 and a Master of Arts degree with first-class honours in 1902. As a teenager the Sheehy household kept an open house on the second Sunday night of each month at 2 Belvedere Place near Mountjoy Square, and in 1896–1897 James Joyce and his brother Stanislaus were regular visitors; Joyce later depicted the family in Ulysses, describing Bessie in terms that she strongly objected to. She was sent to Germany for a short period at the age of eighteen for treatment of tuberculosis. After graduating from the Royal University, she worked in Paris for a time as an au pair, returning to Ireland in 1902.

== Politics and activism ==
=== Suffragette and trade unionism ===
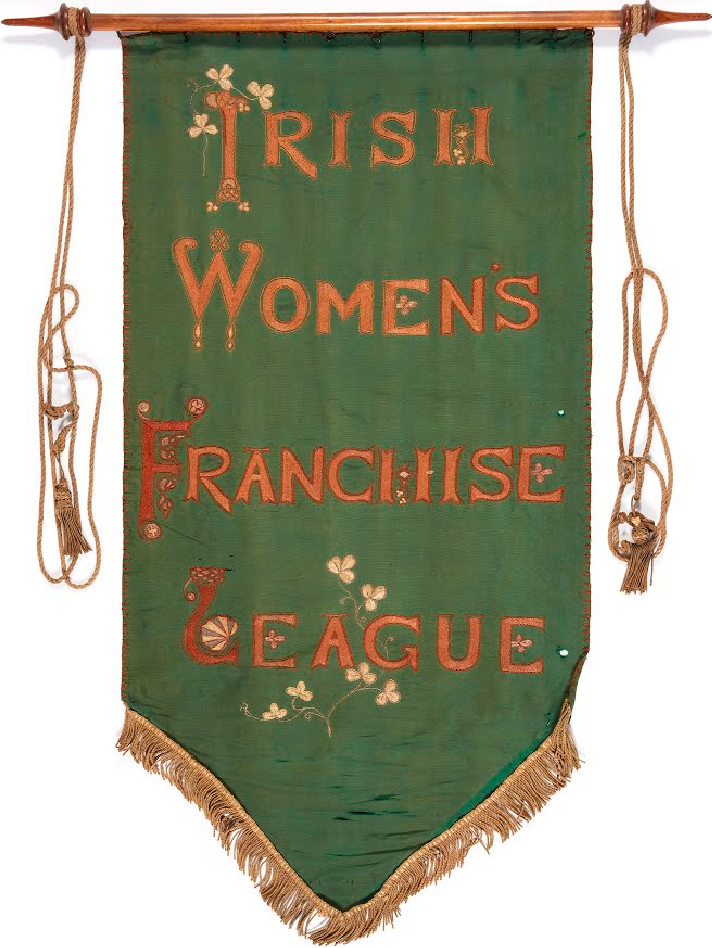
IWFL Banner

Hanna Sheehy-Skeffington was born into a strongly republican family. In November 1908, she was among the founders of the Irish Women's Franchise League (IWFL), alongside her husband Francis, Margaret Cousins and James Cousins. Although it began with only twelve members, it grew rapidly and became Ireland's largest suffrage society. By 1912, the IWFL reported having more than 1,000 members, making it Ireland's largest suffrage organisation. Although Hanna was a committed nationalist, she chose not to join Inghinidhe na hÉireann when it was founded in 1900, nor Cumann na mBan in 1914. She argued that women in nationalist groups were relegated to secondary roles behind men (a point of much debate at the time), and maintained that genuine citizenship could only be achieved through securing the right to vote.

The movement escalated in 1912. On 25 May of that year, Sheehy-Skeffington and Margaret Cousins launched The Irish Citizen, a feminist newspaper that within a month was selling about 3,000 copies and reaching up to 10,000 readers. On 13 June, she was arrested with seven other women for smashing the windows of Dublin Castle. Convicted a week later, she served a month in Mountjoy Prison and a further month after refusing to pay a fine, but was granted political prisoner privileges.

The socialist ideas of James Connolly had a strong influence on her, and during the Dublin lock-out of 1913, she worked in Liberty Hall with other suffragists to help feed the families of strikers. That November she attempted to present leaflets to Bonar Law and Sir Edward Carson, was arrested for assaulting a police officer and imprisoned in Mountjoy once again, where she undertook a five-day hunger strike before release. In the same year, she lost her post as a teacher at Rathmines School of Commerce because of her militancy.

She opposed Ireland's involvement in the First World War when it broke out in August 1914. In April 1915, the British government prevented her from attending the International Congress of Women at the Hague and in June, her husband was imprisoned for anti-recruitment activities.

=== Revolutionary era ===
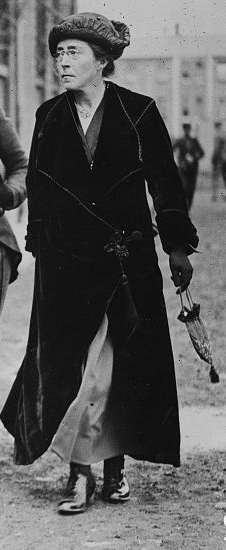
Hanna Sheehy-Skeffington in 1916

In Easter 1916, Francis Sheehy-Skeffington was arrested and shot dead by British soldiers. She only discovered this two days later and refused all compensation for his killing. After his death, she assumed editorship of the Irish Citizen, a post she held intermittently until the paper ceased in 1920.

In December 1916, she travelled to the United States on behalf of Sinn Féin to publicise the struggle for Irish independence. She toured extensively, beginning at Carnegie Hall in New York on 6 January 1917, before travelling through the New England states, the Midwest and the West Coast. In Chicago, she addressed 3,000 people at Orchestra Hall and also spoke at Harvard and Columbia Universities. In January 1918, she received a petition from Cumann na mBan urging President Woodrow Wilson to support Irish self-determination, and in May, she addressed Madison Square Garden. On 27 June 1918, she returned to Ireland with her son Owen.

In October 1917, she was the only Irish representative at the League of Small and Subject Nationalities and was accused of pro-German sympathies. Around the same time she became a Sinn Féin executive.

She published British Militarism as I Have Known It, which was banned in the United Kingdom until after the First World War. Upon her return to Britain in August 1918, she was arrested in Dublin, sent to Bridewell Jail and then to Holloway where she went on hunger strike. After her release, Sheehy-Skeffington attended the 1918 Irish Race Convention in New York City. In 1919, she stated that the Irish Citizen had been founded not only to promote feminism and suffrage but also to defend labour and Irish self-determination.

In 1919, Hanna entered municipal politics, being elected to Dublin Corporation as a Sinn Féin candidate. That same year, The Irish Citizen ceased publication. By the time a truce was declared in July 1921, she had become Sinn Féin's director of organisation, and she also sat on the executive committee of the Irish White Cross, a relief body funded by the American Committee for Relief in Ireland.

Sheehy opposed the Anglo-Irish treaty, signed in December 1921, and during the Irish Civil War supported the Anti-Treaty IRA. She also co-founded the Women's Prisoners' Defence League with Maud Gonne and Charlotte Despard to support thousands of republican detainees.

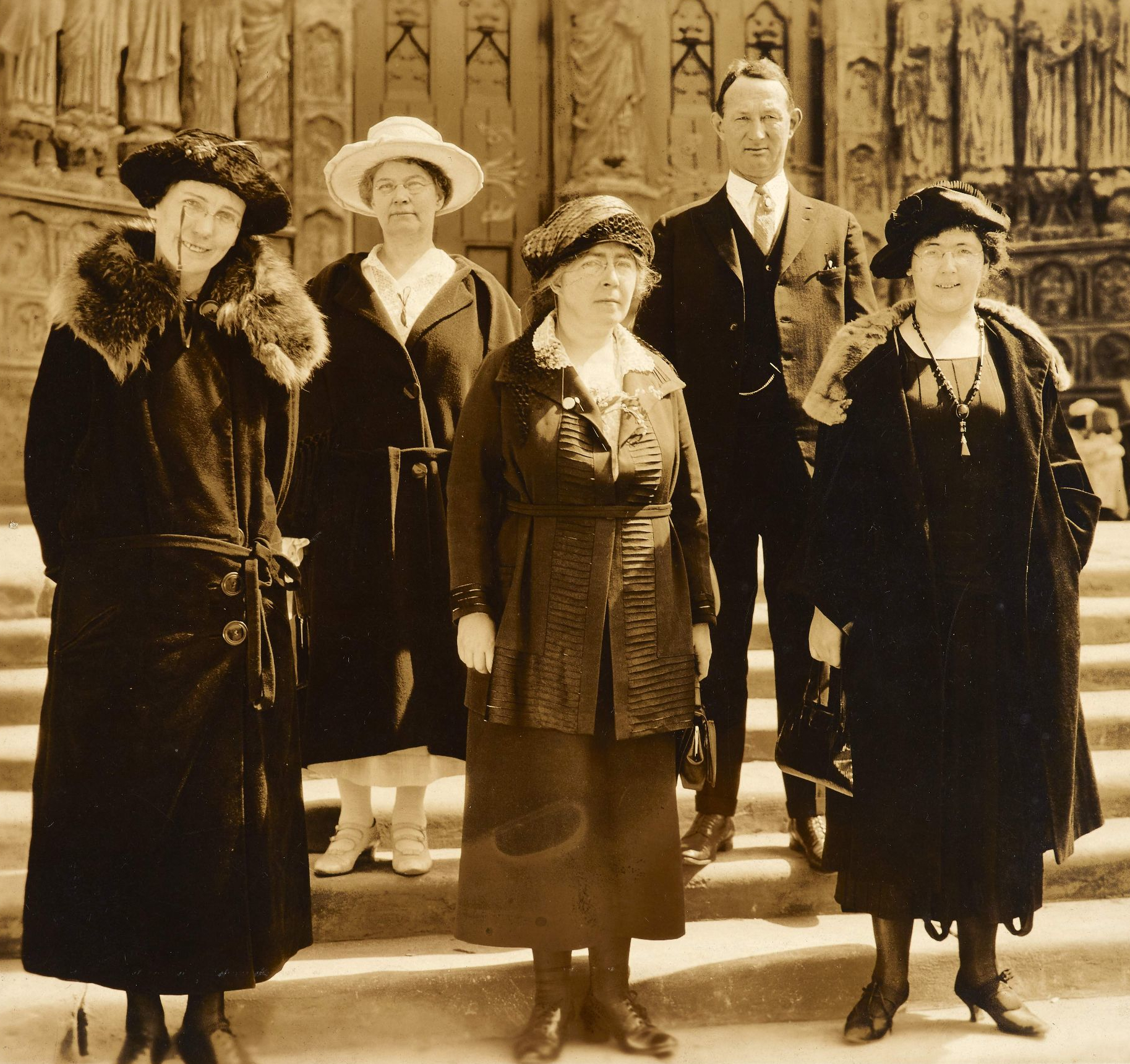
Linda Kearns, Sheehy-Skeffington and Kathleen Boland in Los Angeles in 1923 during their American tour

Between 1922 and 1923, she returned to the United States, this time alongside Kathleen Boland and Linda Kearns, replacing Muriel MacSwiney. Their tour raised $123,000 for Irish prisoners and their families.

=== Irish Free State era ===
In May 1926, Hanna was appointed as one of four women to the executive of the newly founded Fianna Fáil party, though she parted ways with the party when Éamon de Valera led the party into the Dáil. That same year, she attended the Women's International League for Peace and Freedom (WILPF) conference in Dublin, later travelling to Prague for its 1929 congress. A pacifist organisation of which she became vice-president, the WILPF remained central to her activism. Although politically unsettled by the character of the Irish government in the 1920s and 1930s, she continued to campaign as a feminist, while also sustaining herself and her son Owen through journalism for the Irish World and by delivering numerous public talks and lectures.

In 1926, she organised protests against the Abbey Theatre's production of Sean O'Casey's The Plough and the Stars, arguing that it mocked the men and women who had participated in the 1916 Rising.

In August 1930, Sheehy-Skeffington travelled as a delegate of the Friends of Soviet Russia to examine the Soviet system of government, and like many of her contemporaries, she continued to express active sympathy for communism.

Sheehy-Skeffington edited An Phoblacht in the 1930s and was arrested in January 1933 in Newry after defying an exclusion order that barred her from Northern Ireland. At her trial she said: "I recognise no partition. I recognise it as no crime to be in my own country. I would be ashamed of my own name and my murdered husband's name if I did… Long live the Republic!" and was sentenced to a month's imprisonment.

In the mid-1930s, Sheehy-Skeffington became involved in support of the Second Spanish Republic, viewing the Spanish Civil War as part of a wider struggle against fascism with implications for Ireland. She was involved in the Women's Aid Committee, the principal organisation of the Irish pro-Spanish-Republican lobby, which organised meetings, fundraising and aid for the Spanish Republic and for Irish volunteers fighting alongside it. In March 1937, she represented the Committee at the National Conference of the Friends of the Spanish Republic in London, linking Irish support to the wider international pro-Republican movement. Her activism attracted fierce opposition from some pro-Nationalist Irish Catholics: in January 1937, an anonymous correspondent condemned her appeal for aid to the Republic as support for the "Legion of Satan" and "Hellish Bolshevism", warning her that "a day of judgement is coming".

In 1935, Sheehy-Skeffington spoke out on behalf of the Women Graduates' Association against the Conditions of Employment Bill, which sought to restrict women's access to work. The following year, she met and was photographed with Indian independence leader Subhas Chandra Bose during his visit to Ireland. She later opposed the 1937 Constitution and, through the Women Graduates' Association, campaigned publicly against its provisions. In November 1937, motivated by her concerns over the constitution, she helped found the Women's Social and Progressive League, a non-sectarian and non-party women's political organisation. At the 1943 general election, she stood as a candidate in Dublin South, receiving 917 votes (1.7 per cent) but failing to win a seat.

Throughout her career she was also a founding member of the Irish Women Workers' Union, a friend of Cissie Cahalan, and a colleague of Lillian Metge, who contributed to the Irish Citizen and wrote in sympathy after Francis Sheehy-Skeffington's death.

== Personal life ==
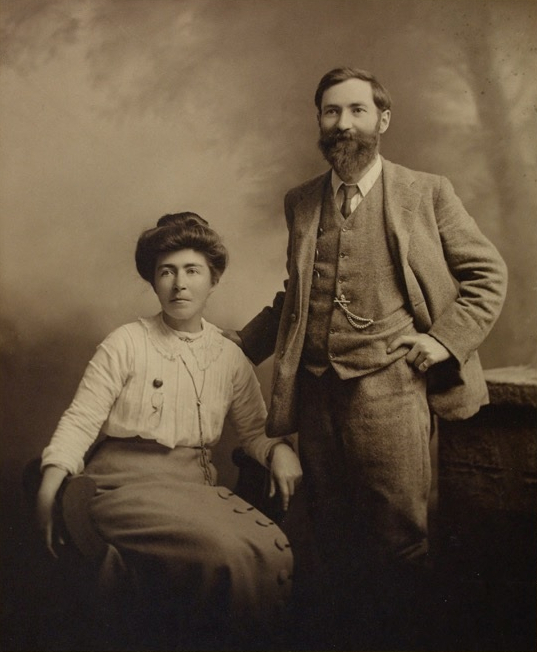
Hanna together with her husband Francis Sheehy-Skeffington

Sheehy was introduced to Francis Skeffington, from County Down, by mutual friend James Joyce, who went to university with Skeffington. The couple would meet regularly in Bewley's Cafe to discuss politics, the arts and religion. Sheehy married Francis Skeffington on 3 June 1903 at University Chapel in St. Stephen's Green, Dublin. The couple wore their graduation gowns as a substitute for a traditional wedding gown and suit. Both husband and wife took the surname Sheehy-Skeffington as a symbol of their honour for one another. This gesture angered Dr. J.B., Francis's father, as it was seen as an act of betrayal to their family's name. The couple moved to 36 Airfield Road, Rathgar, Dublin, shortly after the ceremony. The area was considered pro-British at the time.

Sheehy-Skeffington had one child, a son named Owen. In 2014, Owen's daughter, Dr Micheline Sheehy-Skeffington, won a gender discrimination case against NUI Galway.

Her sister Mary married the writer and politician Tom Kettle. Another sister, Kathleen, married Frank Cruise O'Brien, and was the mother of Conor Cruise O'Brien. The fourth of the sisters, Margaret, married a solicitor, John Culhane, and later the poet Michael Casey. Their two brothers worked as lawyers.

== Bibliography ==
- Sheehy Skeffington, Hanna (1917). British Militarism As I Have Known It . New York City: The Donnelly Press. pp. 17–32.
- Impressions of Sinn Féin in America. An Account of Eighteen Months' Irish Propaganda in the United States. (1919)
- In Dark and Evil Days. (1936)

== Later life and death ==
She died, aged 69, in Dublin, and is buried with her husband in Glasnevin Cemetery.

== Legacy ==
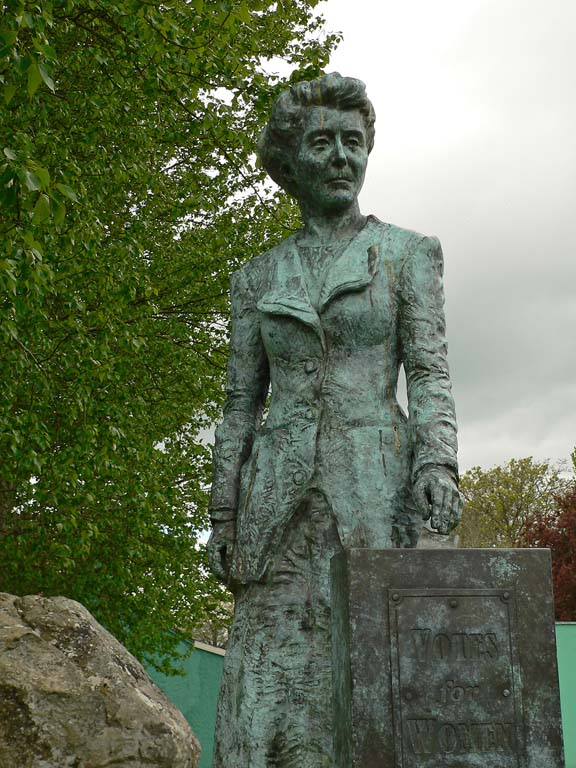
Bronze statue of Hanna Sheehy-Skeffington in Kanturk, Ireland.

There is a bronze statue of her in Kanturk, County Cork, Ireland.

In the 1990s, some of the students of Women's Studies in University College Dublin petitioned to rename their Gender Studies building after Sheehy-Skeffington in order to honour her contribution to women's rights and equal access to third-level education. Her husband Francis Sheehy-Skeffington was himself an alumnus of the university and Sheehy-Skeffington of the Royal University, a sister university of UCD. Their campaign was successful and the building was renamed the Hanna Sheehy Skeffington Building.

Her name and picture (and those of 58 other women's suffrage supporters) are on the plinth of the statue of Millicent Fawcett in Parliament Square, London, unveiled in 2018.

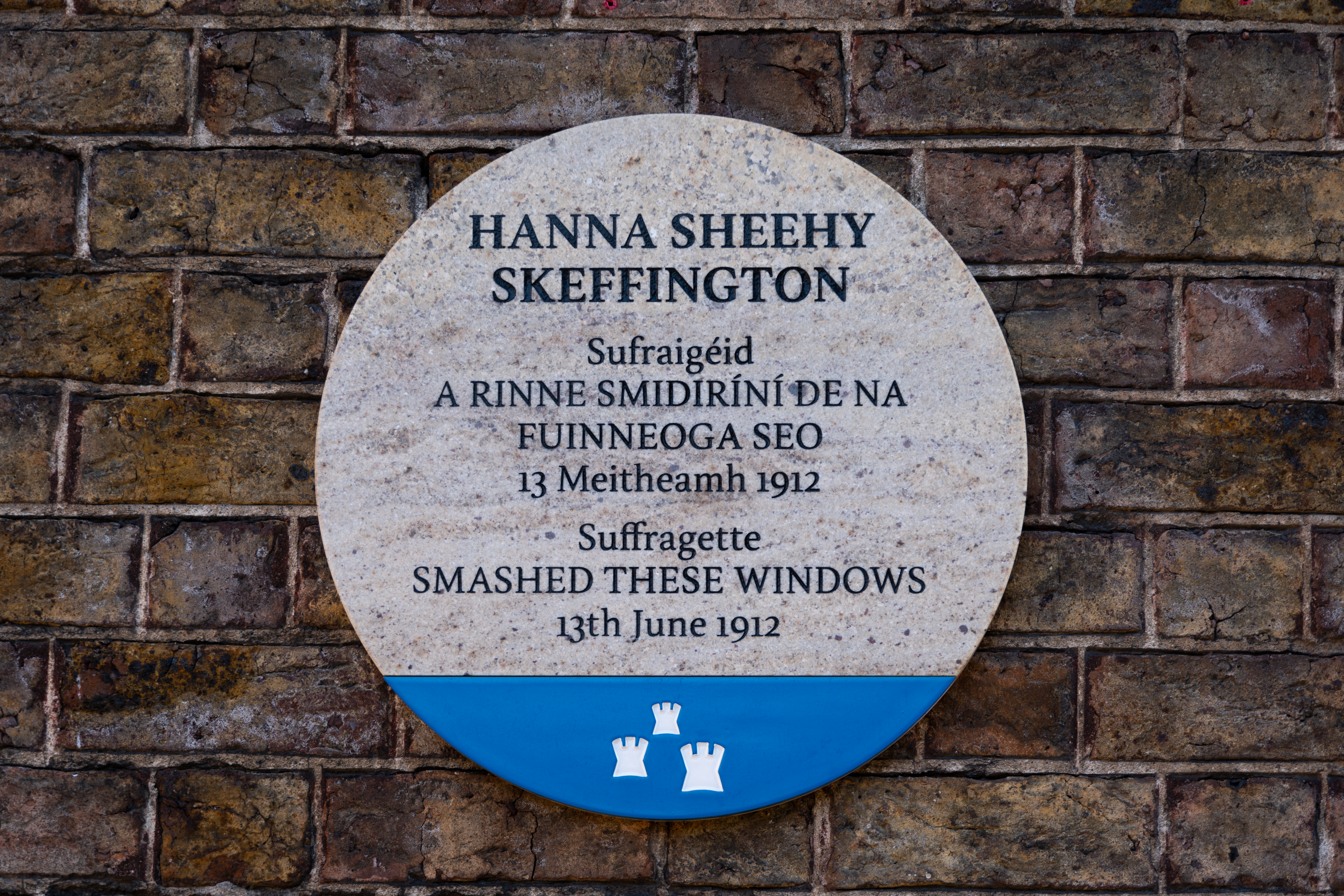
Plaque commemorating Hanna Sheehy Skiffington window smashing

A blue plaque commemorating Sheehy-Skeffington's breaking of windows at Dublin Castle during a protest for women's right to vote can be found on the Ship Street side of Dublin Castle. and her papers are held in the National Library of Ireland as part of the "Sheehy Skeffington Papers" collection.

In October 1977 the historian, Brian Harrison, interviewed Sheehy-Skeffington’s daughter-in-law, Andrée, as part of the Suffrage Interviews project, titled Oral evidence on the suffragette and suffragist movements: the Brian Harrison interviews. Andrée talks about Hanna’s education, her relationship with husband and son, and with Andrée herself, before discussing her political and religious views.
