= Lusitanian flora =

Plants native to the Iberian Peninsula and southwest Ireland

The Lusitanian flora is a small assemblage of plants that show a restricted and specific distribution in that they are mostly only to be found in the Iberian Peninsula or southwest Ireland. Generally, the plants are not found in England or western France even though suitable habitat almost certainly exists in those regions. The plants currently number about 15 species in total and include examples such as Irish fleabane, strawberry tree and St Patrick's-cabbage. The group is of particular interest and importance since it is currently not understood how the current geographical distribution came about. This biogeographical puzzle has been a topic of academic debate since the middle of the 19th century. Conflicting, and as yet unresolved theories centre on whether the Irish populations are a relict, surviving from before the last ice age or whether they have been transported there in the last 10,000 years. Many of the species are also very restricted in their distribution in Ireland, and have become the centre of intense conservation efforts in recent years, for example the Irish Fleabane.

Today it is often stated that these species are native to Ireland and it has been proposed that they probably survived the last ice age in refuges, for instance work on St Dabeoc's Heath. However, Micheline Sheehy Skeffington and co-workers have assembled evidence indicating that several of the Lusitanian plant species were introduced by people traveling by sea from northern Spain. Her initial publications on Mackay's Heath (Erica mackayana) suggest this species was introduced to the west coast of Ireland as several discreet colonies in remote locations through smuggling. This hypothesis has been confirmed by a Spanish genetic study. She has since presented evidence for the introduction of the five other heath-land Lusitanian species; Kerry Lilly (Simethis mattiazzii), Cornish Heath (Erica vagans), Irish Heath (E. erigena), Dorset Heath (E. ciliaris) and St Dabeoc's Heath (Daboecia cantabrica). Her evidence suggests that only the first two were also introduced though smuggling, while Irish Heath appears to have arrived several centuries before the smuggling, in the 15th century, possibly through the pilgrimage by sea to Santiago de Compestella and St Dabeoc's Heath appears to have been introduced prior to historical times. Her other work on Strawberry Tree (Arbutus unedo) shows that it was probably introduced 4,000 years ago by the miners who worked the first copper mine in northern Europe which was on Lough Leane near Killarney in south west Ireland and it was spread from there to successive copper mines in south west Ireland and possibly also to north Wales where is grows near the bronze age copper mine on the Great Orme.

== Gallery ==
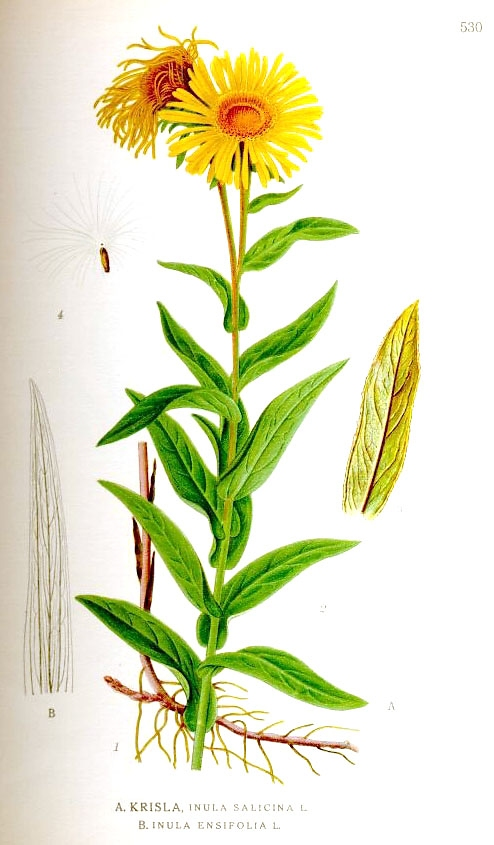
Irish Fleabane

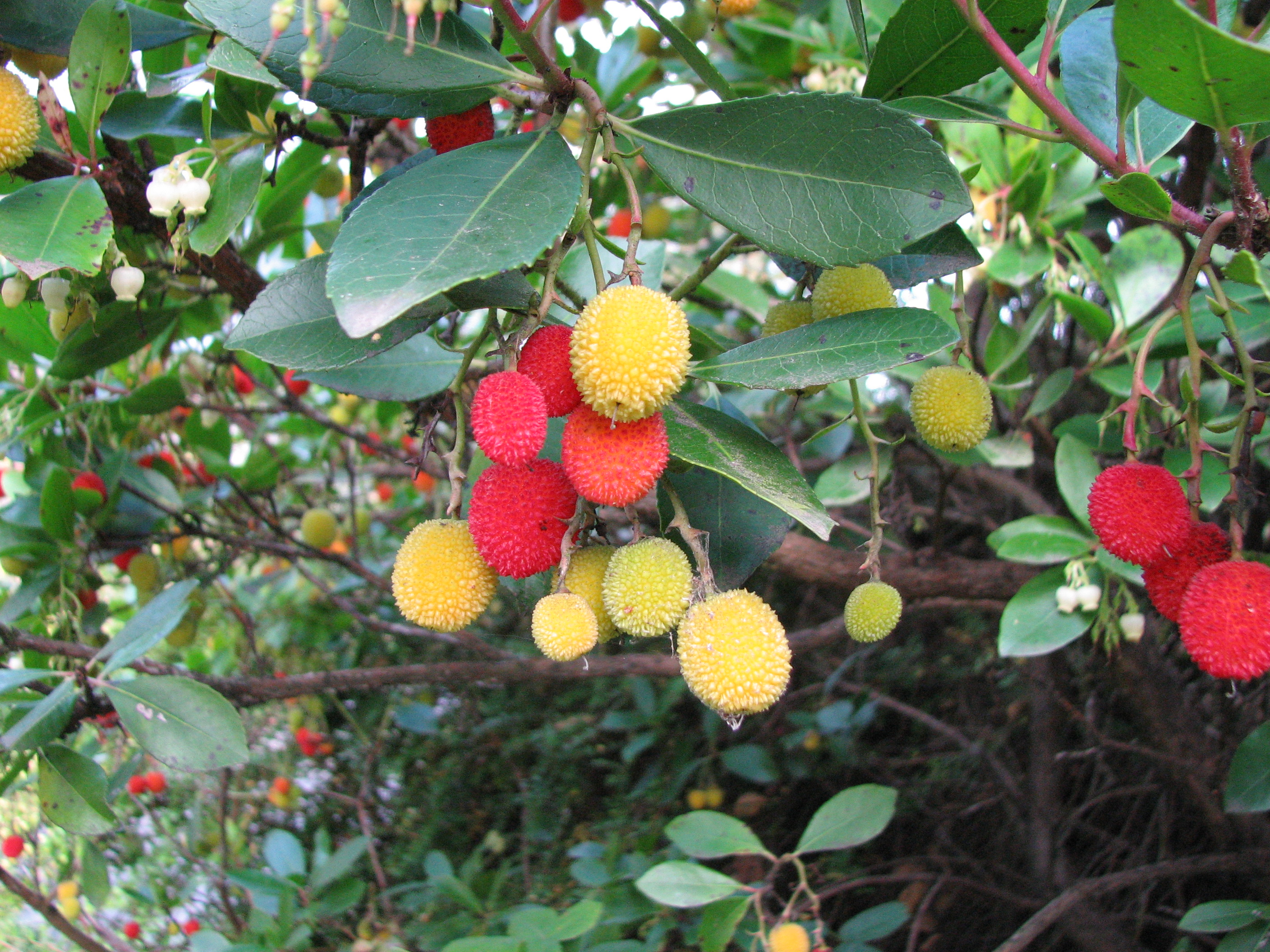
Strawberry tree

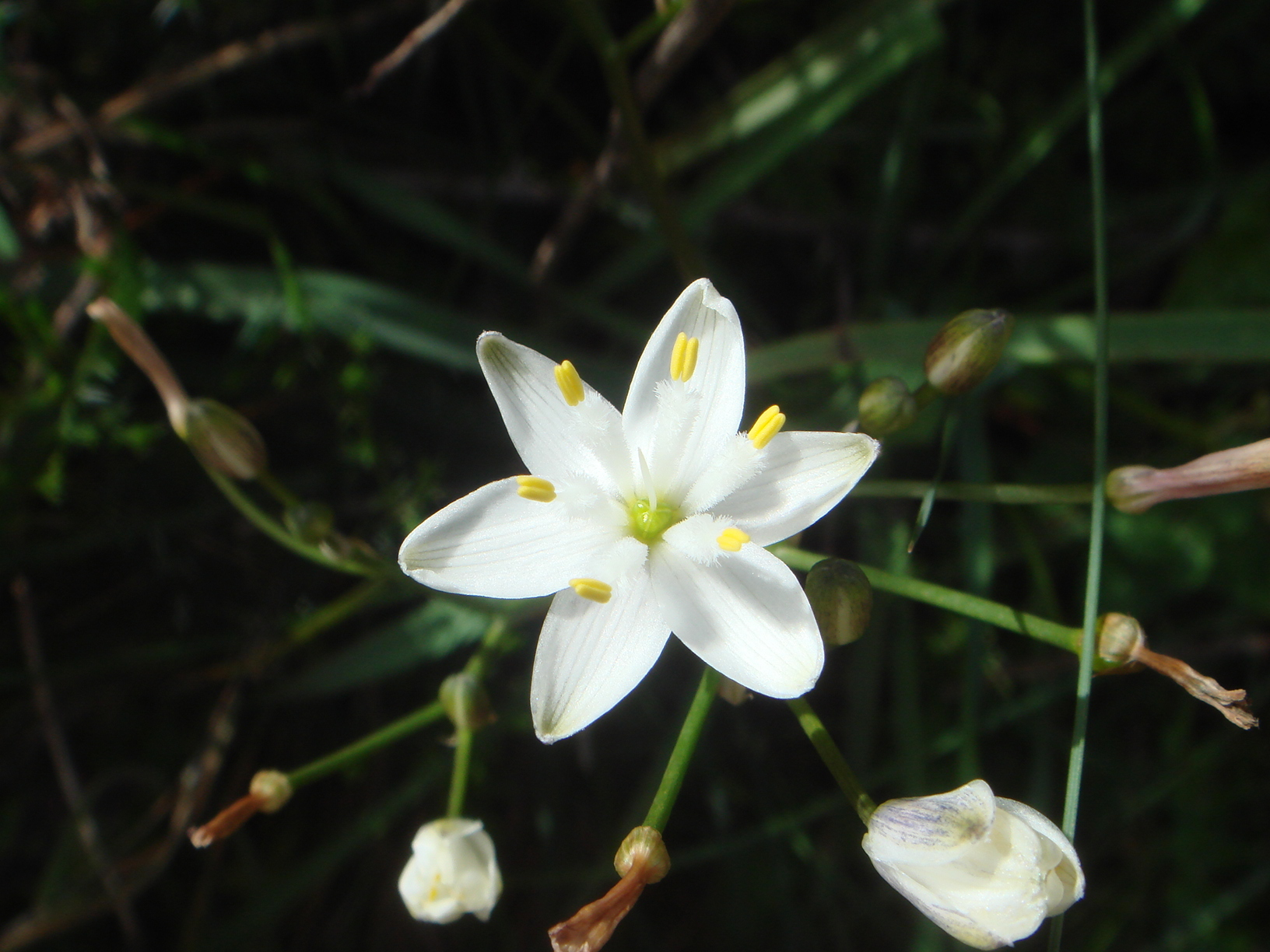
Kerry lily
