= Andrée Sheehy-Skeffington =

French-Irish feminist and writer (1910–1998)

- Born: Andrée Germaine Denis; 24 May 1910; Amiens, France
- Died: 6 June 1998 (aged 88); Dublin, Ireland
- Resting place: Glasnevin Cemetery
- Education: Sorbonne University
- Occupations: Feminist, activist, writer
- Organization: Irish Housewives Association (co-founder)
- Notable work: Skeff: the Life of Owen Sheehy Skeffington 1909-1970 (1991)
- Spouse: Owen Sheehy-Skeffington (m. 1935; died 1970)
- Children: 3, including Micheline
- Relatives: Francis Sheehy-Skeffington (father-in-law); Hanna Sheehy-Skeffington (mother-in-law)

Andrée Sheehy-Skeffington (née Andrée Germaine Denis; 24 May 1910 – 6 June 1998) was a French-born Irish feminist and writer, known for co-founding the Irish Housewives Association.

== Early life and family ==
Sheehy-Skeffington was born Andrée Germaine Denis on 24 May 1910 in Amiens, France to Eugene Denis and Germaine Denis (née Fontaine). The eldest of four siblings, both of Denis' parents were school teachers who held socialist and pacifist views. From 1928, Denis studied at the Sorbonne, Paris, before studying on a scholarship in America between 1933 and 1934.

In March 1935, Denis married Owen Sheehy-Skeffington in Amiens, who had been known to her family since 1904 and who had been teaching in Paris between 1931 and 1933. The couple settled in Dublin, where Andrée worked in translation and French tuition. They were involved in activist, pacifist, and cultural activities in the city, and while Owen was suffering from tuberculosis (1937–9), she substituted for him as a lecturer at Trinity College Dublin. The couple had two sons and one daughter, Micheline Sheehy Skeffington.

== The Emergency and Irish Housewives Committee ==
Sheehy-Skeffington rose to particular prominence during The Emergency, when she was active on the Council of Action, an initiative of the Labour Party and trade unions. Through its housing section, she offered advice and support to tenants of tenements threatened by rent profiteering. She was one of five women – and the only one with existing political experience – who, in 1941, drafted the "housewives' petition", circulated and reported widely upon in advance of budget day. Seeking means of influencing government policy in response to the scarcity and poverty of the period, the petition was responsible for stimulating the introduction of rationing.

Building on the petition's momentum, in May 1942, Sheehy-Skeffington, Hilda Tweedy, Louie Bennett, and Susan Manning formed the Irish Housewives Committee (from 1946 the Irish Housewives Association), with Sheehy-Skeffington and Tweedy as joint honorary secretaries. Lawrence William-White describes the IHA as:

Non-party and non-sectarian, through the war years and beyond, the body established itself as a major advocate in consumer affairs, and in issues regarding the welfare of women and children. It monitored price controls, lobbied national and local government bodies, issued reports, and promoted the involvement of women in the political process.

Sheehy-Skeffington was a prominent figure in the organisation, undertaking meticulous research into the issues they addressed, and training others in data gathering and reporting. She played a key role in producing the IHA's publication, The Irish Housewife, and represented them at the 1949 conference of the International Alliance of Women in Amsterdam. The IHA were attacked for policies such as advocating free school meals, and were accused of communist sympathies during the Cold War. Disagreements over how to respond to these criticisms emerged between executive committee members.

In 1955, following a series illness and operation, Sheehy-Skeffington resigned as secretary.

== Later years and death ==
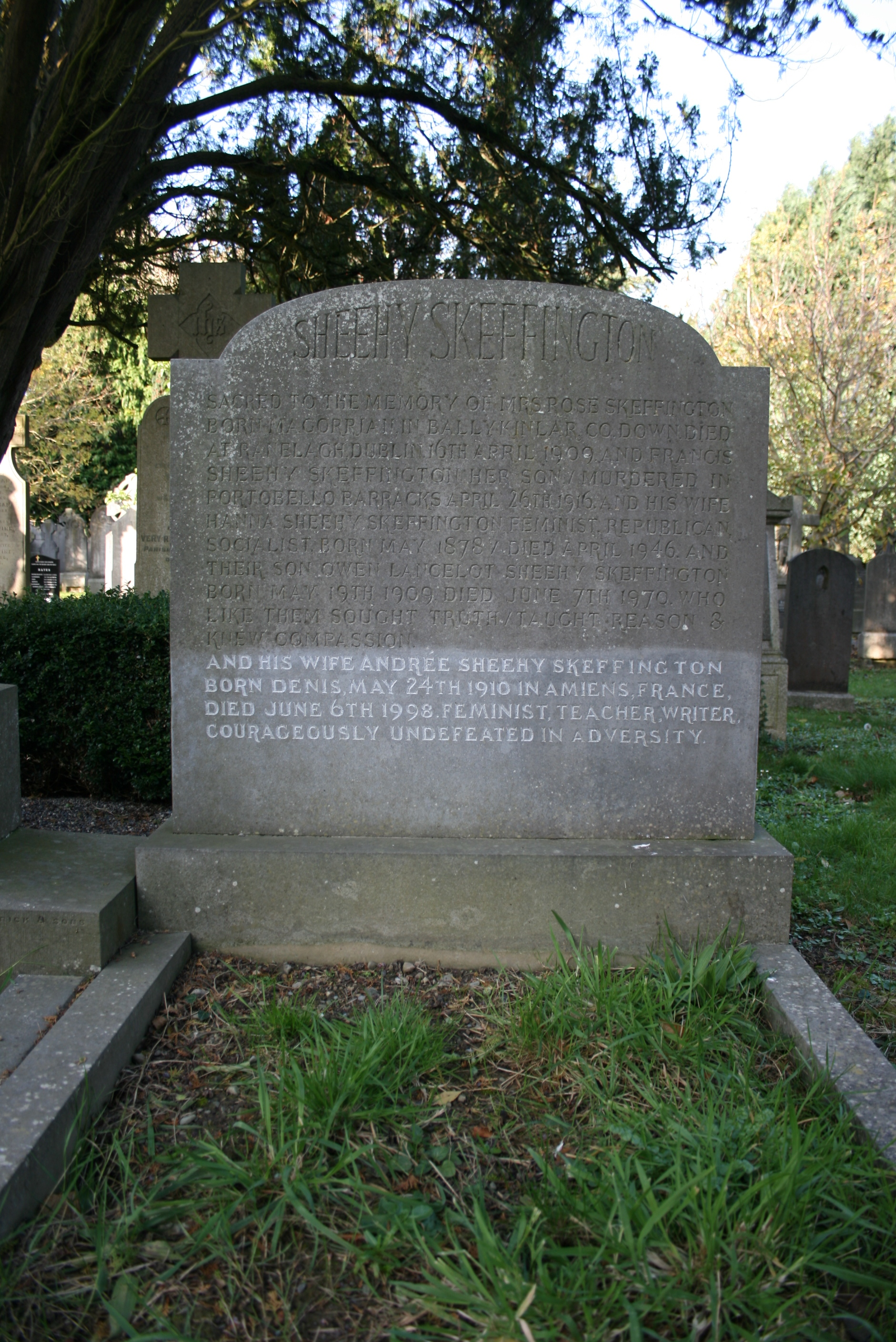
Sheehy-Skeffington family grave at Glasnevin Cemetery

Owen Sheehy-Skeffington died in 1970. In 1991, Andrée published an acclaimed biography of him, which earned her an honorary degree from Trinity College Dublin.

In 1983, Andrée was interviewed by Evelyn Conlon, and in 1997 by Brian Harrison as part of an oral history project on the women's suffrage movement. She also donated the collection known as the Sheehy-Skeffington Papers to the National Library of Ireland, comprising over twenty thousand documents, including the papers of Francis and Hanna Sheehy-Skeffington, their ancestors, Owen Sheehy-Skeffington and Andrée.

Sheehy-Skeffington died 6 June 1998 at 69 Terenure Road West, Dublin, where she had lived since the mid-1950s. She was buried at Glasnevin Cemetery.
