= Micheline Sheehy Skeffington =

Irish botanist and equity advocate

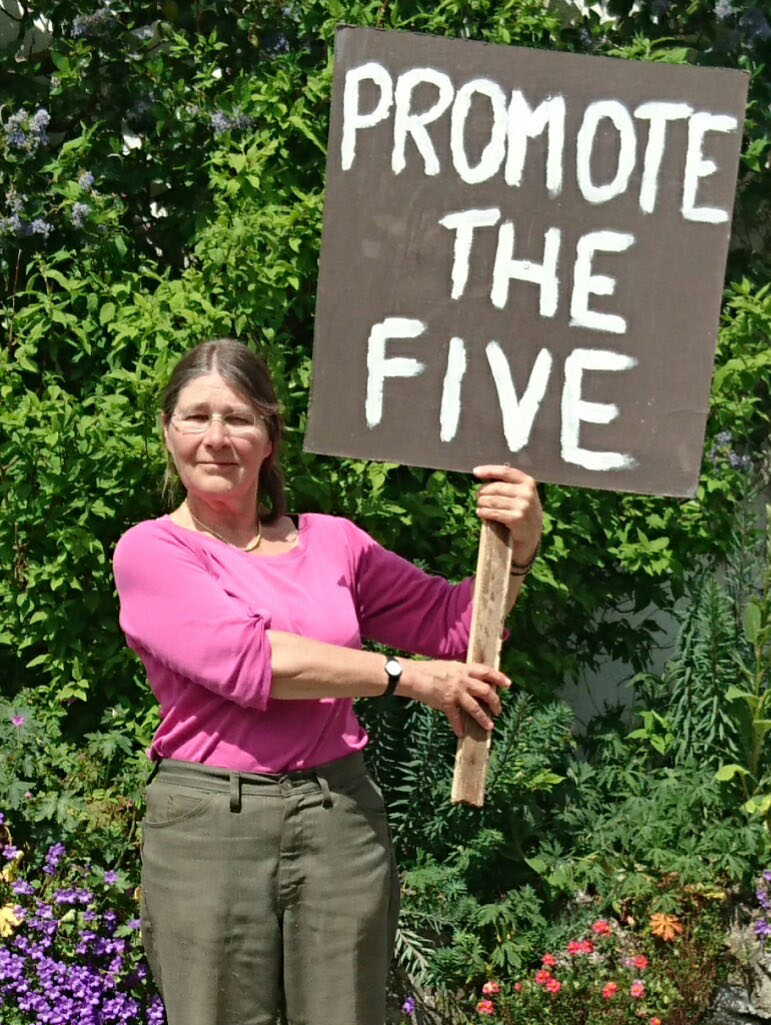
- Sheehy Skeffington in 2016
- Born: 1953 (age 72–73)
- Occupations: Botanist, equity advocate
- Employer: University of Galway (1980–2014)
- Organization(s): Botanical Society of Britain and Ireland (President, 2022–2024)
- Known for: Botany; winning a landmark Equality Tribunal case against the University of Galway in 2014
- Parents: Owen Sheehy-Skeffington (father); Andrée Sheehy-Skeffington (mother)
- Relatives: Francis Sheehy-Skeffington (grandfather); Hanna Sheehy-Skeffington (grandmother); David Sheehy (great-grandfather)

Micheline Sheehy Skeffington (born 1953) is an Irish botanist and equity advocate. Elected President of the Botanical Society of Britain and Ireland in November 2022, she was the third woman and second Irish person to hold the position since the Society's founding in 1836.

== Life ==
Micheline Sheehy Skeffington was born in 1953, the daughter of Andrée Sheehy-Skeffington and Owen Sheehy-Skeffington, and the granddaughter of Francis and Hanna Sheehy-Skeffington.

Sheehy Skeffington is a plant ecologist, with an interest in terrestrial ecosystems. She conducted research aimed at understanding and conserving the important plant habitats that are left in the west of Ireland including turloughs, sand dunes, peatlands, the Shannon callows, the Burren, grasslands, heathlands, woodlands and montane communities, and research on sustainable farming for conservation in Cuba, Indonesia and Chiapas, Mexico. She was appointed to The Heritage Council 1995–2000, and chaired the Council Wildlife Committee 1999–2000. She worked at the University of Galway for 34 years, joining in 1980 as a lecturer. In 1984, with Peter Wyse Jackson, she published The Flora of Inner Dublin.

In 2014, Sheehy Skeffington won a landmark Equality Tribunal case against the university after it was found she lost out on a promotion on the basis of her gender. She told The Irish Times that her "family history of trying to address injustice was part of the reason" she took the case:

I believed I was representing discrimination against women in general. I have it in the genes. If I see an injustice I have to do something about it.

The university was ordered to promote Sheehy Skeffington to senior lecturer from July 2009 (the year in which she was denied the promotion on which the case was based), to pay the salary difference in full, and to award her €70,000. They were also ordered to review their policies and procedures. The case was the first successful win of its kind in Ireland or the UK.

Sheehy Skeffington took early retirement from the University of Galway in September 2014.

Sheehy Skeffington donated the €70,000 award to five other women academics who were also passed over for promotion, beginning "Micheline’s Three Conditions Campaign", aiming to secure their promotions. From 2018, with journalist Rose Foley, she wrote the story of the campaign in Micheline’s Three Conditions: How We Fought Gender Inequality at Galway’s University and Won.

Sheehy Skeffington’s most recent research concerns Ireland’s Lusitanian flora, 16 plant species which occur only in the west or south west of Ireland that have a striking disjunct distribution, with their nearest or principal other occurrence in north Spain. They are generally believed to be native to Ireland and include such iconic species as Strawberry Tree, Large flowered Butterwort, St Patrick’s Cabbage, Kerry Lilly and Irish Orchid. Her initial publication on Mackay’s heath, assembled evidence to show this species had probably been introduced originally through carriage on smuggled goods hidden amongst heathland on their route inland from the west coast. This hypothesis was confirmed by a genetic study by Fagúndez that showed that populations had limited variability and no unique haplotypes, consistent with a recent introduction, and that each population was more closely related to a different population in Spain, consistent with each being introduced through separate smuggling trips. Sheehy Skeffington went on to show how each of the five other heathland Lusitanain species were also probably introduced by man, but only two of them through smuggling and at least one of them prior to historical times. Her work on another Lusitanian species, Strawberry Tree has shown how this was probably introduced approximately 4,200 years ago by miners working the first copper mine in northern Europe which was on Lough Leane near Killarney in south west Ireland and how this introduction was referred to in Irish mythology.
