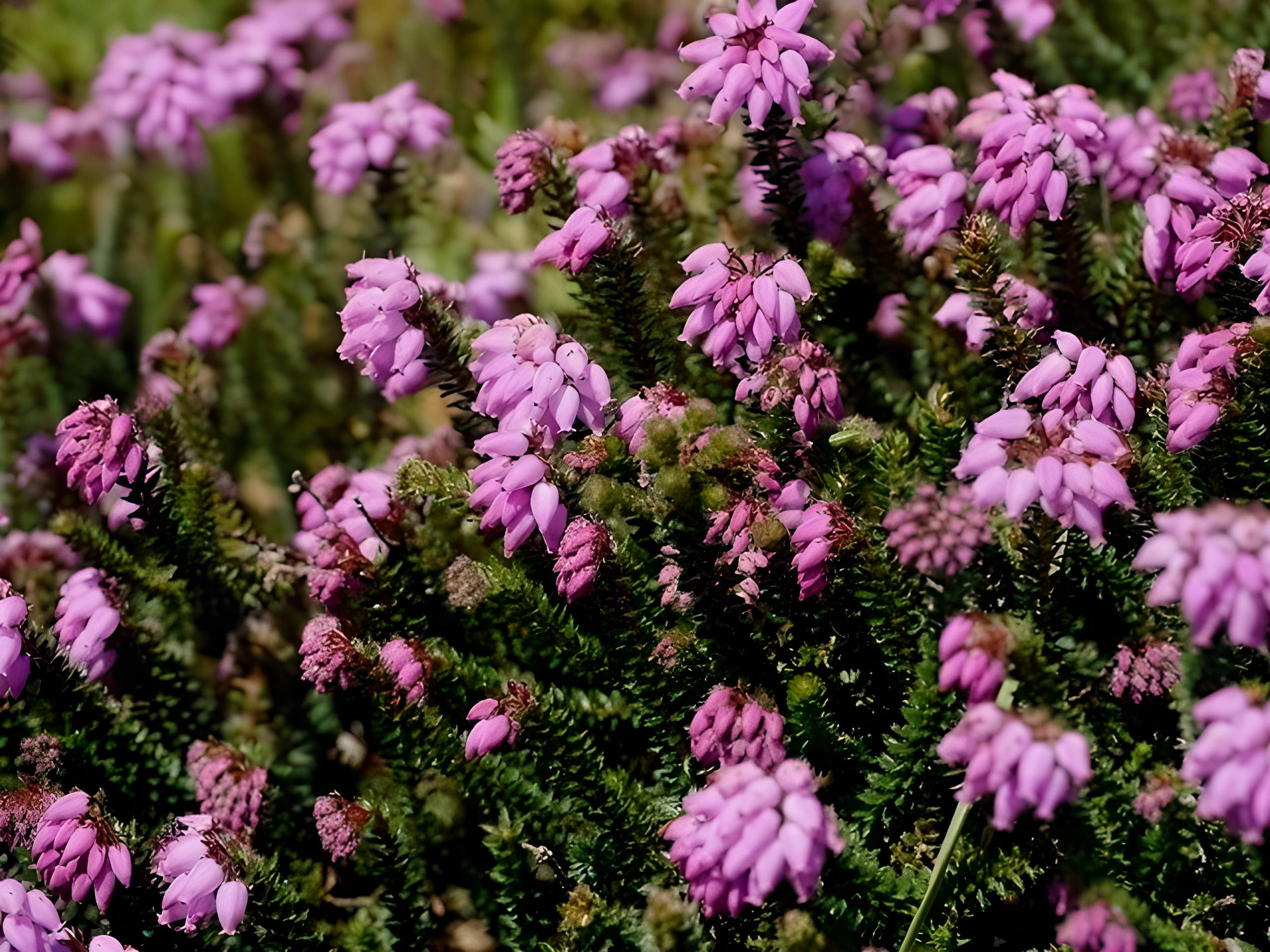

Conservation status
- Least Concern (IUCN 3.1)

Scientific classification
- Kingdom: Plantae
- Clade: Embryophytes
- Clade: Tracheophytes
- Clade: Angiosperms
- Clade: Eudicots
- Clade: Asterids
- Order: Ericales
- Family: Ericaceae
- Genus: Erica
- Species: E. mackayana

Binomial name
- Erica mackayana Bab.

Synonyms
- Synonymy: Erica ciliaris subsp. mackayana (Bab.) T.Moore & More; Erica mackaii Hook.; Erica mackayi (Kuntze) Hook. ex C.K.Schneid.; Erica tetralix subsp. mackaiana (Bab.) Syme; Erica tetralix subsp. mackayi (Kuntze) Macfarl.; Erica tetralix var. mackayana (Bab.) Loudon; Erica tetralix var. mackayi (Kuntze) Zabel; Ericoides mackayi Kuntze

= Erica mackayana =

Species of flowering plant

Erica mackayana, (Note: The species name was previously spelled mackaiana, but was changed by 2016 to correct an orthographic mistake. Although this has been recognised by many sources, including the Catalogue of Life and the International Plant Names Index, some sources still use the old spelling.) also known as Mackay's heath, is a species of flowering plant in the family Ericaceae.

== Description ==
Erica mackayana is a subshrub, generally growing between 20–30 centimetres (7.9–11.8 in) but rarely growing up to 90 centimetres (35 in) high. It grows numerous branchlets which are densely covered in small leaves which are elliptical to oblong-lanceolate in shape and arranged in a whorl of four.

The flowers vary between bright reddish purple and rose pink in colour and are generally paler on the side of the plant which is more shaded. They are arranged on umbels (umbrella-like stalks) positioned at the end of branchlets, with ten to twelves flowers on each umbel. The sepals are hairless apart from having cilia on their edges, and the anthers have long subulate (tapering) appendages attached to them.

== Taxonomy ==
Erica mackayana was discovered in Spain and Ireland at almost the same time in the summer of 1835; it was found by Durieu and Gay in Spain and by William McAlla in Ireland. A sample was sent to J. T. Mackay, the curator of the botanic garden of Trinity College Dublin, in Ballsbridge, Dublin. Mackay believed it to be a form of Erica cinerea and sent it to the British Museum (now the Natural History Museum, London) for comment. It was found to be a new species and named Erica mackaiana after Mackay. In the 21st century, the species was renamed to Erica mackayana, correcting an orthographic mistake.

Erica mackayana is a close relative of Erica tetralix, and was previously suggested to be a variety of it. E. mackayana hybridises with E. tetralix to produce Erica × stuartii.

E. mackayana, E. tetralix and E. adevalensis make up a clade of 'cross-leaved heaths'.

== Distribution and habitat ==
Erica mackayana is native to Spain and was likely introduced to Ireland, even though it is often described as native; it has a Hiberno-Lusitanian distribution. Micheline Sheehy Skeffington suggests that the species was brought to Ireland in the medieval period, potentially through trade, smuggling, or by pilgrims returning from Santiago de Compostela. A 2023 study found that E. mackayana populations in Ireland were connected to several different Spanish populations, suggesting more recent migration such as via trade routes in the 19th and 20th centuries. (Note: In comparison, the same study found that E. tetralix populations had a phylogeographic pattern consistent with a more gradual northwards migration where more geographically distant populations also had greater genetic differences.)

In Spain, E. mackayana grows in an 'Atlantic wet heathlands' habitat which is protected by the European Union's Habitats Directive. In these areas, E. mackayana populations are supported by grazing, especially by wild ponies. The habitat occurs in the north of the country between Santander and A Coruña. In D. A. Webb's 1955 article on E. mackayana, he notes populations occurring from Mondoñedo in the west to Cabezón de la Sal in the east. The species is not generally found south of the Cantabrian Mountains and its altitudinal range is 0–1,680 metres (0–5,512 ft) above sea level (since it has been found at sea level in Colunga), though it is much rarer above 1,000 metres (3,300 ft).

In Ireland, it grows in wet heathland and peat bogs in Kerry, Mayo, Galway, and Donegal. It has been found at Lough Nacung Upper, Bellacorick, Nephin Beg, Roundstone Bog, Carna, and Caunoge in Kerry. The population at Lough Nacung Upper was discovered in 1954 and extended across almost the entire north-east edge of the lake as well as part of the south-west edge; it was not found at the nearby lakes of Dunlewey Lough or Lough Nacung Lower. The environment was described as "a narrow strip of bog" less than 40 metres (130 ft) wide. In Ireland, the species' altitudinal range is 20–65 metres (66–213 ft) above sea level.

=== Associated species ===
In Ireland, Erica mackayana associates with Molinia caerulea, Calluna vulgaris, Erica tetralix and Schoenus nigricans. In Spain, where the species has a wider range, it associates with Ulex europaeus, Daboecia cantabrica, Molinia caerulea, Potentilla erecta, Erica vagans, Blechnum spicant, and Pteridium aquilinum.

== Ecology ==
In Ireland, E. mackayana only undergoes vegetative reproduction. However, it commonly hybridises with E. tetralix to produce E. × stuartii. In Spain, E. mackayana only infrequently hybridises, meaning that E. × stuartii is very rare.

== Cultivation ==
Like other species of heath, Erica mackayana has become a cultivated species. It was first cultivated in 1835, becoming popular with gardeners since its cuttings generally propagate successfully.
