= James Bermingham (Irish Republican Brotherhood) =

Irish nationalist (1849–1907)

- Drawing of James Bermingham published in a Dublin newspaper at the time of his death 1907
- Born: December 1849; Dublin
- Died: June 4, 1907 (aged 57); Jervis Street Hospital, Dublin
- Occupations: Plumber and Sanitary Contractor
- Known for: Prominent "advanced nationalist"

James Bermingham (1849–1907) was a prominent "advanced nationalist" in Dublin during the last quarter of the nineteenth and early part of the twentieth centuries.

== Early life ==
James Bermingham was born in Dublin in December 1849. The church register of St. Nicholas of Myra, Francis Street, Dublin, shows that he was baptised there on Monday, 17 December 1849. His father was Peter Bermingham and his mother was Ellen Flood. The sponsors at his baptism were James D'Arcy and Bridget Daly. The officiating priest was Fr. Nicholas O'Farrell, curate.

== Personal life ==
In his personal life, James Bermingham was a plumber and Sanitary Contractor living at 26 Cuffe Street, Dublin. He married Margaret Byrne, a native of County Wicklow, in St. Andrew's Church, Westland Row, Dublin on 21 September 1873.

== Membership of the Irish Republican Brotherhood ==
James Bermingham was a veteran of the 1867 Fenian Rising. As a member of the Irish Republican Brotherhood he was present at the attack on the police barracks at Tallaght. At the funeral of James Stephens the founder of the Irish Republican Brotherhood on 31 March 1901, James Bermingham was one of the pall bearers along with Michael Davitt, C. G. Doran, Michael Lambert, William Brophy and William Hickey – all '67 veterans.

== Irish National Amnesty Association ==
James Bermingham was an honorary treasurer of the later Irish National Amnesty Association, operating from the Workmen's Club at 41 York Street, Dublin, which campaigned between 1892 and 1899 on behalf of the Irish and Irish-American political activists who were imprisoned during the 1880s. He was a mainstay of the Association, and contemporary newspaper reports show the range of his work.

On 13 August 1898 the Kentucky Irish American newspaper reported on a visit by James Bermingham and Mr. T. Kelly (Secretary of the Amnesty Association) to Tom Clarke (alias Henry Wilson) to Portland Prison, Dorset. The report was as follows:

"What Is Being Done to Secure the Release of Irishmen Confined In British Prisons – Their Condition."

"The usual weekly meeting of the Irish Amnesty Committee was held on Monday evening in Dublin, Mr. Troy presiding. Messrs. Bermingham and Kelly reported as to their visit to Mr. Henry Wilson (Tom Clarke) in Portland jail on Thursday last. Mr. Wilson is in fairly good health, much better than he was, on account of being is allowed now to work in the open air. He is to be released in November next, having spent fifteen years and six months in prison, the six months being extra punishment for breaches of prison discipline, which Mr. Wilson states was for whispering to his poor comrades to keep their hearts up.

Mr. Wilson latterly complains of the action of the Government in his case, as it was conveyed to him two years ago by a visitor that he would be released soon. The Home Secretary had promised as much, and instead of being released, the Government had made him complete the full fifteen years and an additional six months as above stated. Mr. Wilson is very much concerned about the men who will be left in jail after his release. These poor men are not in as good health spirits as Mr. Wilson is, and a special effort should be made to have them all released at the same time, as the effect of their comrade being gone would perhaps be the means of adding melancholy to their already prolonged sufferings.

The committee, having considered this report, decided that the Home Secretary should be written to and asked his intentions as to the remaining prisoners now in Portland. If his reply is not satisfactory, a vigorous agitation will be commenced for the purpose of effecting their release."

In September 1896, James Bermingham visited Queenstown (Cobh), County Cork to make arrangements for the departure of the released prisoner James Murphy (alias Alfred George Whitehead) for America. (In 1883 Murphy, with Tom Clarke and others, was sentenced to penal servitude for life at the Old Bailey for allegedly planning a bombing campaign in England. He was released in 1896.) Murphy sailed from Queenstown for New York on 13 September on board the Cunard Line steamer Lucania. On 19 September The Nation, published Bermingham's report to the Amnesty Association of his visit to Cork:

"Mr Bermingham arrived on Thursday and stayed until the ex-political prisoner sailed yesterday (Sunday). He reported that Mr. Whitehead has been well cared for by the local men, and the Executive desire to thank Mr. Meade T.C. for his efforts, also Mr. Deane, agent for the Cunard Company, for the great kindness and interest that he took in seeing that Mr. Whitehead would be properly cared for on his voyage. The remittance which Mr. Bermingham was entrusted with was forwarded to Mr. Egan in New York payable to Mr. Whitehead on his arrival"

In early October 1898 James Bermingham and Michael Lambert, on behalf of the Amnesty Association, welcomed Tom Clarke (alias Henry Wilson) back to Ireland on his arrival at the North Wall, Dublin, on board the SS Banshee after Clarke's release for prison in England. Tom Clarke was later to be the first signatory of the 1916 Proclamation.

On 21 October 1898 the Irish National Amnesty Association paraded Clarke and two other released prisoners (John Henry O'Connor and Edward O'Brien Kennedy) from 41 York Street through the city to the Round Room of the Rotunda. James Bermingham with the executive committee of the Amnesty Association accompanied Clarke and the other ex-prisoners as they crossed the city. The Freeman's Journal (22 October 1898) described the procession as follows:

"National music was rendered by several fife and drum bands, and flags and banners were borne by many of the contingents taking part. Hundreds of torches were carried in the procession, and their brilliant glare lighted up the streets and showed the great dimensions of the meeting and the immense crowds of spectators that gathered on either side of the roadway"

== 1798 Centenary Celebrations ==
The centenary celebrations of the 1798 Rising was seen by advanced nationalists as an opportunity to revive republican sentiment, and United Irishmen Centennial committees were set up throughout the country to organise commemorative events. The main event was planned for Dublin. A big demonstration culminating in the laying of the foundation stone of a proposed Wolfe Tone memorial in the middle of the road at the junction of Grafton Street and St. Stephen's Green took place on Monday 15 August 1898. James Bermingham was active in the Central Branch of the United Irishmen Centennial Association.

Maud Gonne wrote of meeting James Bermingham at the laying of the foundation stone of the Wolfe Tone Memorial in St. Stephen's Green, Dublin, on 15 August 1898. She said that she was standing in the crowd because she did not want to join the platform party with parliamentarians who "were eulogising Wolfe Tone and trying to keep the people from following his teaching". James Bermingham ("an old Fenian workingman member of the Dublin Amnesty Association") took her hand and, along with Michael Lambert, "the two old Fenians" brought Maud Gonne to the back of the platform to where the foundation stone had been lowered. Maud Gonne later wrote: "...in a low voice I promised for the Irish people that we would achieve Wolfe Tone's work, – an Independent Irish Republic". When one of the meeting stewards noticed Maud Gonne with Bermingham and Lambert and asked what they were doing behind the platform, James Bermingham responded: "None of your business. Go back and listen to Mr. Redmond and Mr. Dillon!"

The foundation stone of the proposed memorial was removed by the Commissioners of the County Borough of Dublin as a traffic obstruction in November 1925 and is now on display in the 1798 Memorial Park on Wolfe Tone Quay, Dublin.

== Campaign to win a Municipal Post for Tom Clarke ==
James Bermingham was a prominent member of a committee which was set up to lobby in support of Tom Clarke's application for two municipal posts in Ireland, the clerkship of Rathdown Union (1899) and a post as supervisor of an abattoir (1900), the second after Clarke had gone to New York. Clarke was unsuccessful in both applications.

== Dublin Municipal Politics ==
In the 1890s and early 1900s "advanced nationalists" began to stand for election to county councils and other municipal bodies – particularly after the Local Government Act 1898 which radically extended the local government franchise by entitling all householders and occupants of a portion of a house to vote in local elections including all women over the age of thirty, provided they satisfied the same criteria as men.

In May 1902 James Bermingham was elected from the Mansion House Ward to the position of Poor Law Guardian on the South Dublin Board of Guardians. He was re-elected in May 1905 and remained a Poor Law Guardian until his death in 1907.

== Death ==
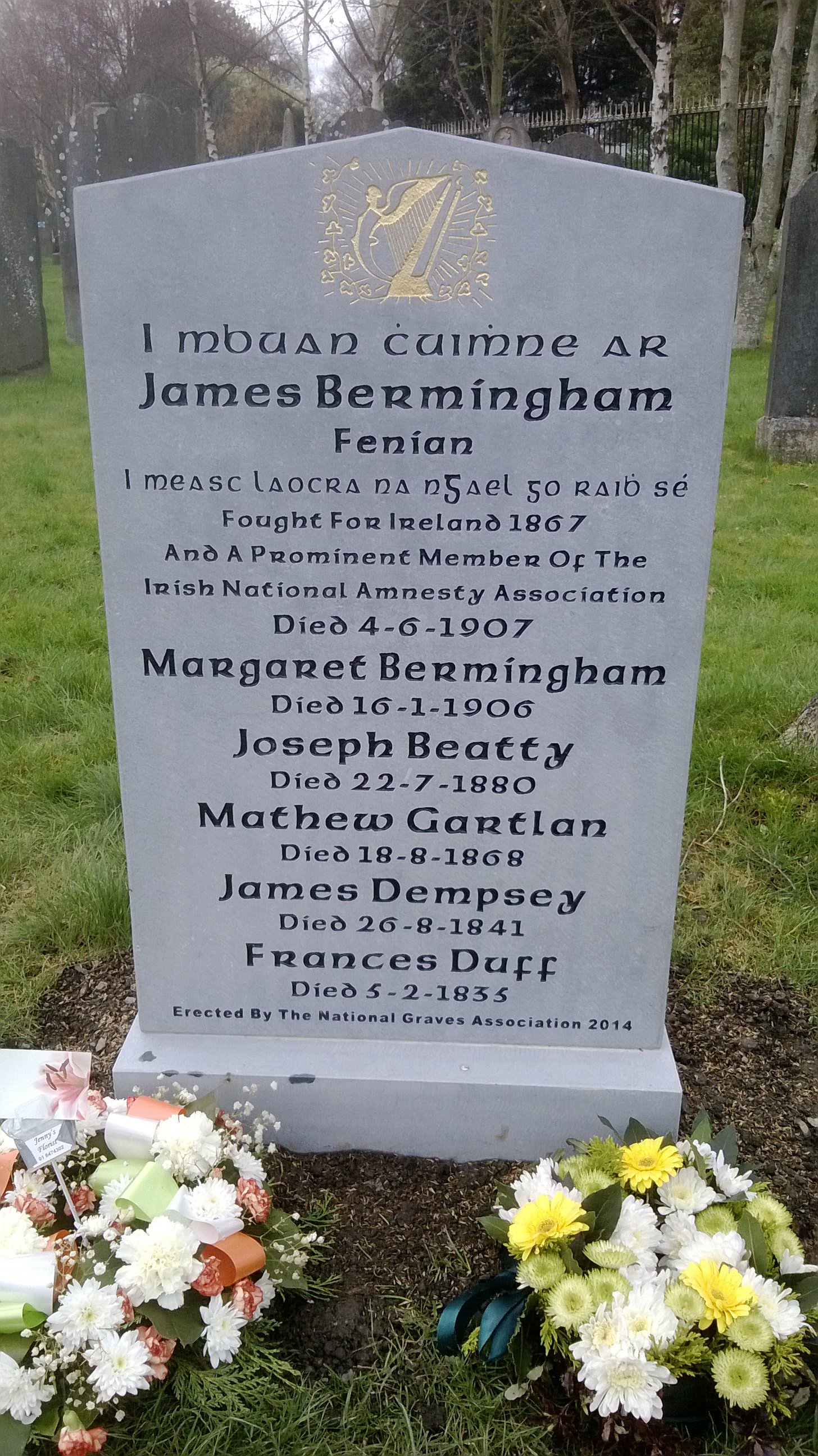
James Bermingham's grave in Glasnevin Cemetery, Dublin

James Bermingham died on 4 June 1907 at Jervis Street Hospital, Dublin. His funeral from University Church, St. Stephen's Green, to Glasnevin Cemetery was a large public event. Many of his old Fenian comrades were present along with a number of Nationalist members of parliament, Trade Union representatives and Dublin City Council officials and public representatives. He was laid to rest beside his wife Margaret who died during the previous year.

In James Bermingham's obituary in the Irish Independent headed Dublin Nationalist's Death it was said of him:

"Yesterday there passed away in Dublin, in the person of Mr. James Bermingham, P.L.G., Cuffe street, another of the veterans of the ’67 movement. As a member of the Irish Republican Brotherhood, he was present at the attack on the police barracks at Tallaght in ’67. He was widely known and deeply respected in Nationalist circles in Dublin. But the work in which, perhaps, he was most prominent, however, was the later Amnesty movement started in 1892. From the start of the Irish National Amnesty Association in the Workmen’s Club, York street, of which latter he was always one of the mainstays, he was one of its most earnest members. He was, with the late Fleet Surgeon Ffrench-Mullen, R.N., for many years an honorary treasurer of the Association, and in the cause of Amnesty no one did more unsparing or more untiring work, the true worth of which was only known to those intimately associated with him. In later years the deceased gentleman acted as a member of the South Dublin Board of Guardians, in which he rendered quiet but effective work. The funeral will take place from the Catholic University Church, Stephen’s green, on to-morrow morning."

P. T. Daly the trade union activist and a vice-chairman of the Irish Citizen Army wrote of James Bermingham:

"his death will be felt by every Irish Nationalist but particularly by everyone who knew him"
