= Cuffe Street =

Street in South Dublin city

- Great Cuffe Street
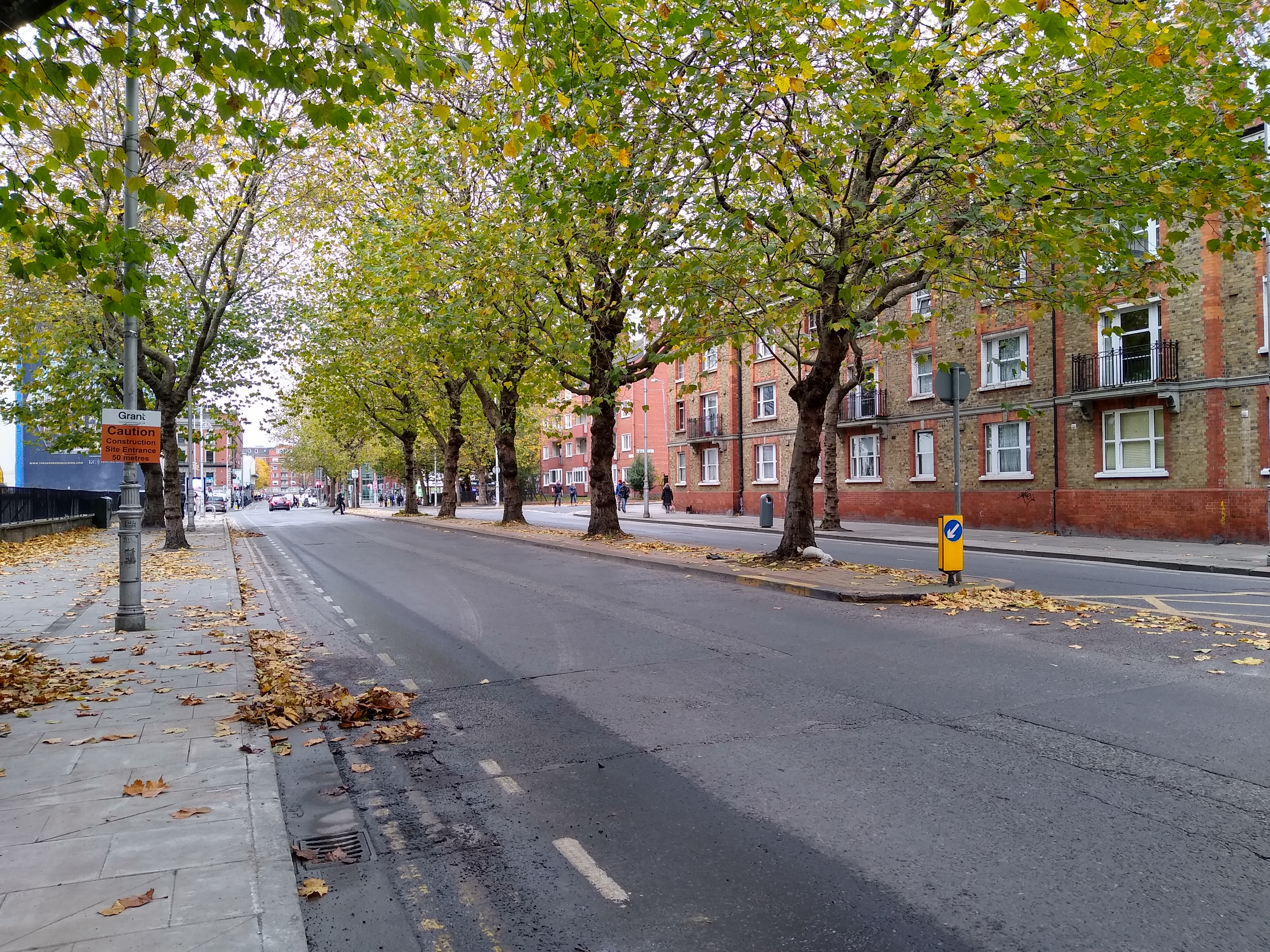

- Location within Central Dublin
- Native name: Sráid Mac Dhuibh (Irish)
- Namesake: James Cuffe MP
- Location: Dublin, Ireland
- Postal code: D02
- Coordinates: 53.3376507°N 6.26666°W
- east end: Kevin Street Lower, Camden Street
- west end: St Stephen's Green

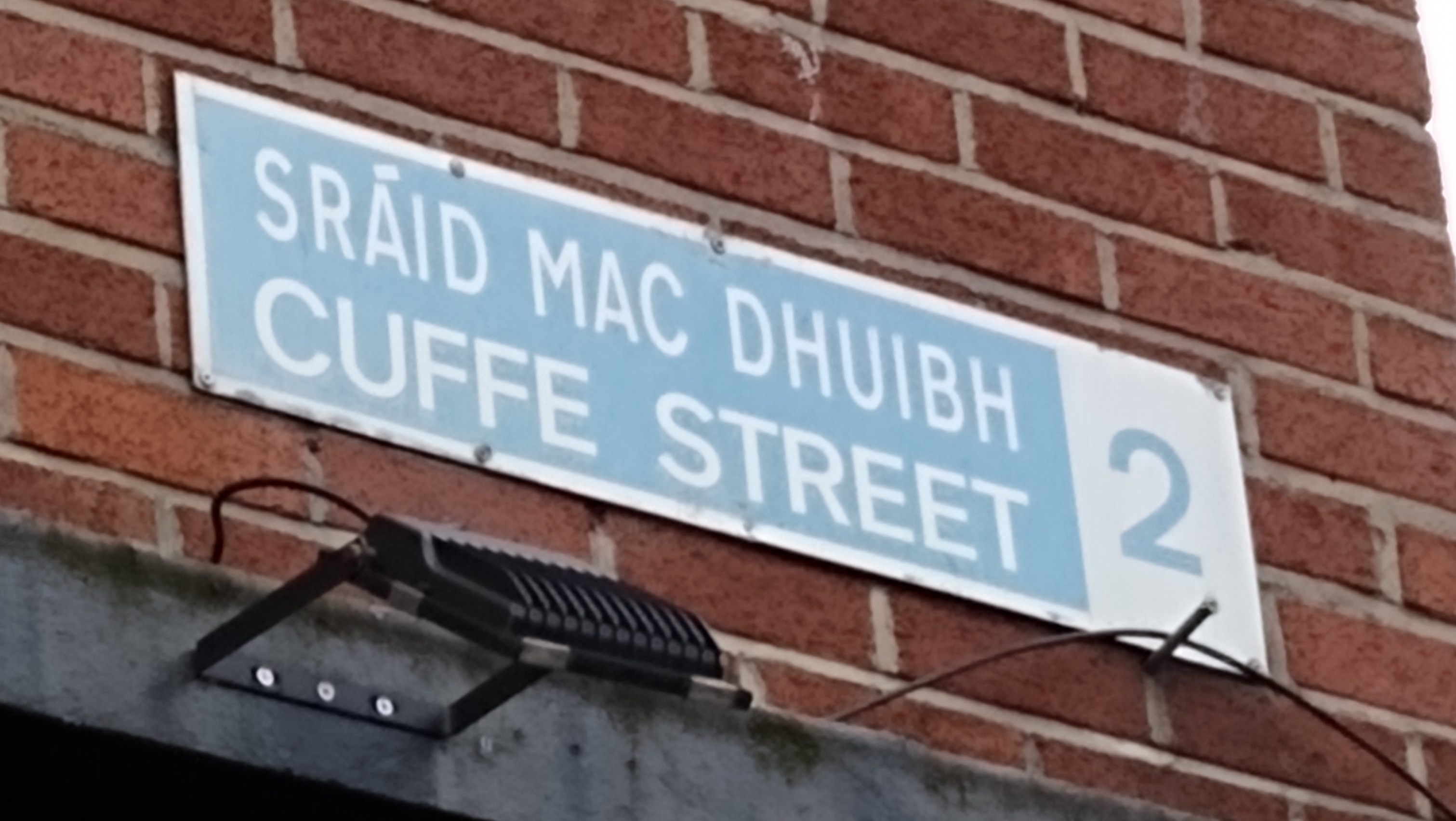
Street sign

Cuffe Street (Irish: Sráid Mac Dhuibh or Sráid Cuffe) is a street in Dublin, Ireland which runs from St Stephen's Green at the eastern end to Kevin Street Lower at the western end.

The street is intersected by Mercer Street and Montague Court.

The street is not to be confused with what was formerly Cuffe Street on the north side of the city which connected Bloody Bridge with Barrack Street. The street was later renamed Ellis Street.

== History ==
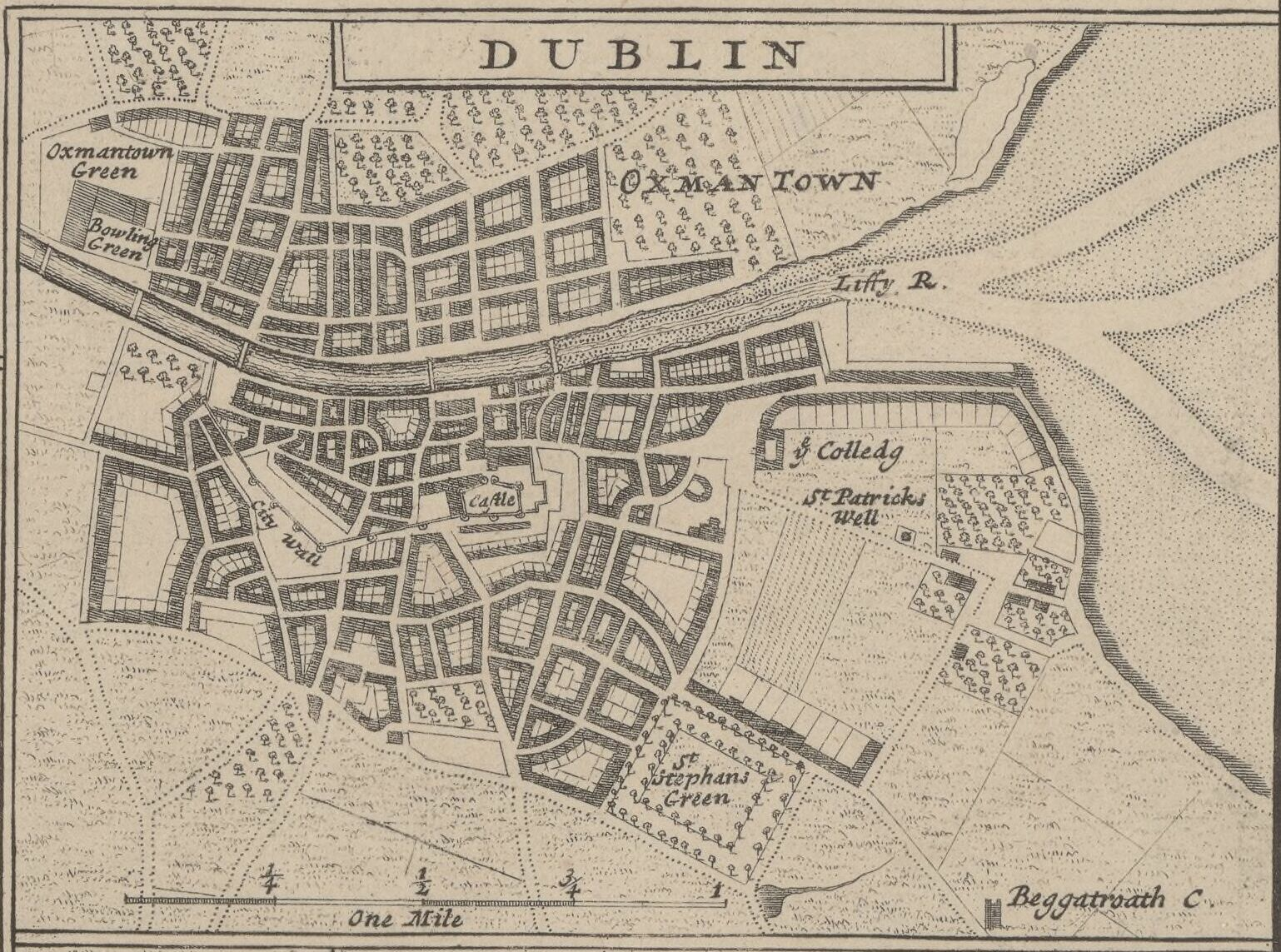
Dublin 1714 (Moll)

Cuffe Street was named after James Cuffe and first appears on Bernard de Gomme's map of Dublin of 1673. It is detailed with buildings lots only along its northern side on Herman Moll's map of 1714.

It first appears named as 'Great Cuffe Street' on Charles Brooking's map of Dublin (1728), likely to distinguish it from the other Cuffe Street, now named Ellis Street, on the north side of the city. On John Rocque's map of Dublin in 1756, it is again named Great Cuffe Street.

The residential buildings built in the early 1700s were mostly gable-fronted houses, so-called 'Dutch Billys', which were largely modified in the later Georgian and Victorian periods with flat parapets and sometimes with retrofitted flat rooves. The remaining 17th and 18th century buildings were demolished as part of the Dublin Corporation's road-widening scheme from the 1960s through to the late 1980s when ultimately the dual carriageway and tree-lined present appearance came to be.

=== Bricklayers' Hall ===
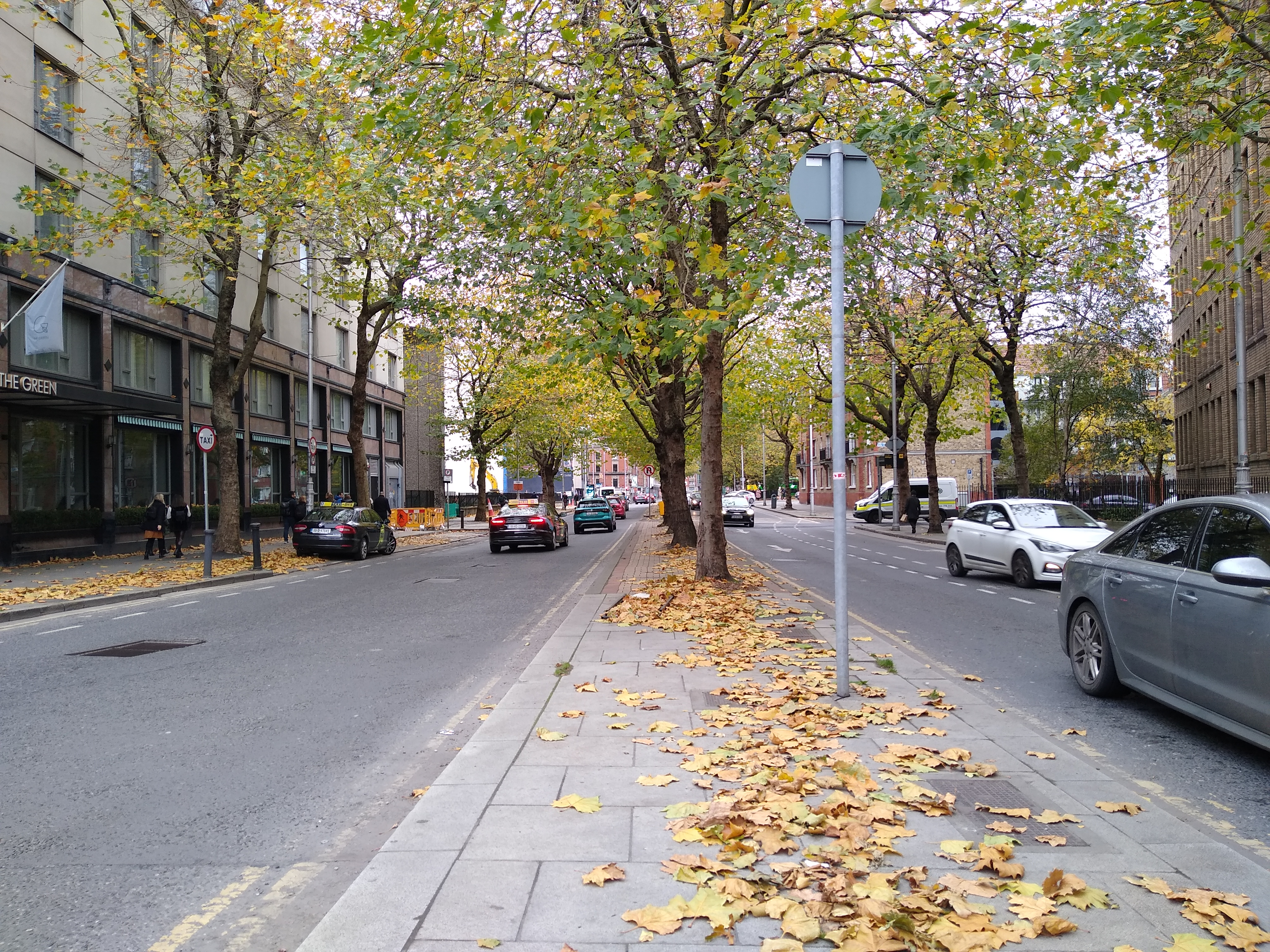
Cuffe Street

49 Cuffe Street for a period housed the headquarters of the Bricklayers' and Stonecutters' Guild, a successor body to one of the original Guilds of the City of Dublin. The building was originally constructed as the St Peter's Parish Savings Bank until its failure in the 1840s but the narrow building was later widened with an extra bay and separate door. It was demolished as part of the Dublin Corporation road widening scheme in 1985 which resulted in a settlement of £87,857. An ensuing legal action resulted in a court case and it was ultimately decided that the façade of the building would be saved and rebuilt along the new street line, with the money paid from the Corporation increasing to £244,414 for the strip of land they needed for the newly widened road. The façade was never reassembled, and Dublin City Council pursued reimbursement in 1996 with a repayment of £159,000 ultimately ordered by the High Court.

As of 2021, the numbered remaining elements of the Bricklayers' Hall are said to be held in storage by Dublin City Council.

=== Winter Garden Palace ===
The corner of Cuffe Street and St Stephen's Green was the site of the Winter Garden Palace for over 200 years. From early reports in 1866, it was referred to as the Winter Garden Gin Palace. During the 1880s, it was a meeting place of the Fenian group, the Invincibles. It was also one of the sites occupied by the Irish Volunteers and Irish Citizen Army during the events of the Easter Rising in 1916. The building was subject to the compulsory purchase order in 1966, for the planned road widening. It lay empty and derelict before it was finally demolished in 1975. Alongside the Winter Garden Palace, the residential and retail area bounded by Cuffe Street, Cuffe Lane and St Stephen's Green was bought up by developers MEPC plc and eventually demolished.

=== Ardilaun Centre ===
MEPC later developed an office complex on the site from 1979 to 1981 that was initially rented by the government Department of Posts and Telegraphs for Telecom Éireann. The development was named the Ardilaun Centre for Arthur Guinness, 1st Baron Ardilaun. The building was designed by architects Costello, Murray and Beaumont and constructed by Sisk Group at a cost of £12.5 million.

== Notable residents ==
- James Bermingham - lived at 26 Cuffe Street
- Warden Flood
- Richard O'Carroll - lived at 49 Cuffe Street. O'Carroll Villas building on the street is named in his honour.
- Eliza H. Trotter - lived at 30 Cuffe Street
- Leonard McNally - lived for a period at 20 Cuffe Street

== See also ==
- List of streets and squares in Dublin
