= Owen Sheehy-Skeffington =

Irish academic and politician (1909–1970)

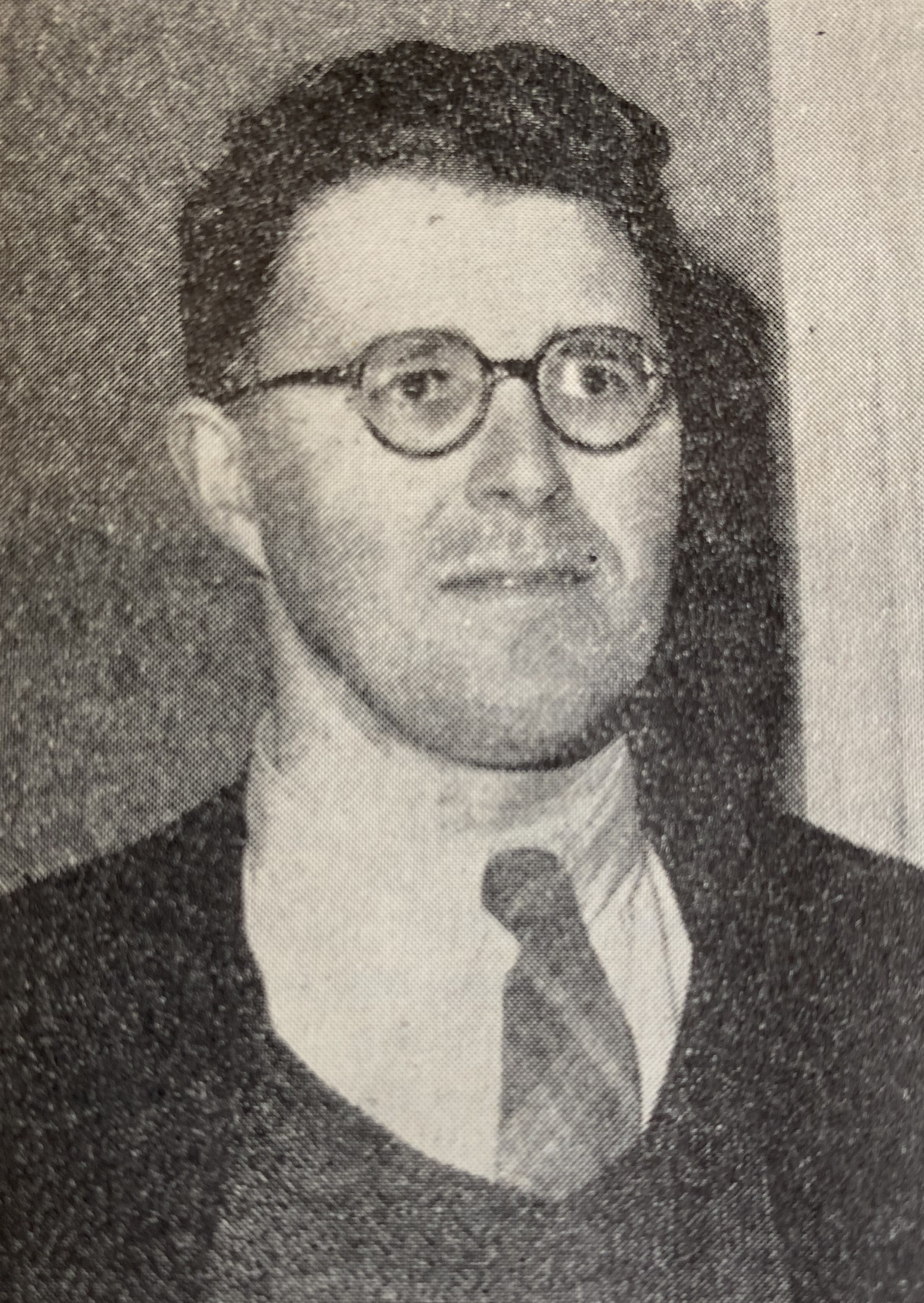
- Sheehy-Skeffington in 1950

Senator
- In office 23 June 1965 – 7 June 1970
- In office 22 July 1954 – 14 December 1961
- Constituency: Dublin University

Personal details
- Born: 19 May 1909 Dublin, Ireland
- Died: 7 June 1970 (aged 61) Dublin, Ireland
- Party: Independent
- Other political affiliations: Labour Party (until 1943)
- Spouse: Andrée Denis (m. 1935)
- Children: 3
- Parents: Francis Sheehy-Skeffington (father); Hanna Sheehy-Skeffington (mother)
- Relatives: David Sheehy (grandfather)
- Education: Trinity College Dublin

Owen Lancelot Sheehy-Skeffington (19 May 1909 – 7 June 1970) was an Irish university lecturer and politician. The son of pacifist, feminist, and socialist activists Francis and Hanna Sheehy-Skeffington, he was politically likeminded, and as a member of the Irish Senate was praised as a defender of civil liberty, democracy, separation of church and state, freedom of speech, women's rights, minority rights, and many other liberal values.

== Early life ==
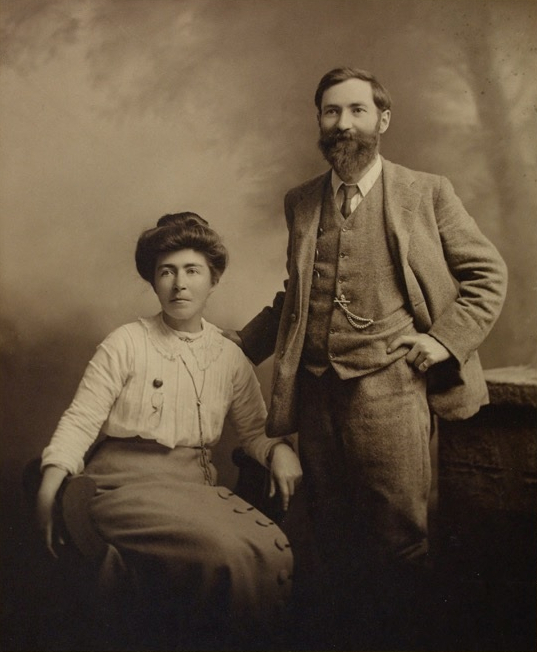
Owen's parents Francis and Hanna Sheehy Skeffington

Sheehy-Skeffington was brought up in Dublin, Ireland. His father, Francis Sheehy-Skeffington, was a pacifist, feminist and socialist whose execution by firing squad, on the orders of Captain J.C. Bowen-Colthurst, during the week of the Easter Rising in 1916, became a cause célèbre. His mother was Hanna Sheehy-Skeffington, a suffragette who founded the Irish Women's Franchise League. His maternal grandfather was David Sheehy, a longstanding member of Parliament for the Irish Parliamentary Party.

As a three-year-old, Francis had taken Owen to see his mother while she was incarcerated at Mountjoy Prison, having been sentenced to two months imprisonment for her actions in defence of women's rights. At five years old he was taken by Hanna to see Francis while he was incarcerated at Mountjoy because of his campaign against conscription during World War I.

After her husband's execution, Hanna became increasingly Republican, supporting the anti-Treaty IRA during the Irish Civil War and Republican and Socialist causes long thereafter.

Through his childhood, Sheehy-Skeffington circulated through a number of prestigious schools, including time spent at Boyland School in Santa Barbara, California and in Dublin, at Sandford Park School, a non-denominational school selected by his mother in the face of strong criticism from her Catholic and Republican friends. His cousin, the diplomat, writer and politician Conor Cruise O'Brien, was a pupil there at the same time. His mother deliberately chose schools viewed as socially progressive for Owen, something that instilled in him lifelong values.

In 1927 he enrolled in Trinity College Dublin, where besides his studies in English and French he excelled in the university's debating society, created several new student organisations and publications, and developed a reputation for activism. He graduated in 1931 as a first-class honours Bachelor of the Arts in English and French.

== Academic career and adult life ==
In the following two years he moved to Paris, where he was a graduate assistant at the École Normale Supérieure, allowing him to renew contact with Samuel Beckett, whose lectures he had attended at Trinity, and to meet James Joyce who had been a contemporary and friend of his father at University College. (Note: University College was part of the Royal University of Ireland. It became University College Dublin, one of three colleges in the new National University of Ireland, in 1908. The others were University College Galway and University College Cork.) It was around this time that he began his doctoral studies studying the work of l'Abbaye de Créteil, which he later converted into a thesis on the work of ‘Jules Romains, the Apostle of Unanimisme’, for which he was awarded a PhD at Trinity in 1935.

It was also in 1935 that Sheehy-Skeffington married Andrée Denis, a French graduate of the Sorbonne and a daughter of friends of his parents from Amiens. It was at Amiens Town Hall the two were wed on 23 March. The early years of their marriage were rough; they survived on Owen's low paid salary as a junior academic at Trinity back in Ireland, and both their relationship and his career was interrupted by Owen suffering a collapsed lung which required him to sojourn to Switzerland for specialist treatment in 1937 and 1938. However, by 1939 Owen was able to resume work at Trinity, becoming a lecturer in French.

Like her husband, Andrée Sheehy-Skeffington was a socially-involved campaigner and an active member of the Irish Housewives Association. She later wrote a biography of her husband, Skeff: A Life of Owen Sheehy Skeffington, 1909–1970. They resided at Hazelbrook Cottage, Terenure, Dublin. The couple had three children together, two boys and a girl.

== Political career ==
In 1943 Sheehy-Skeffington was expelled from the Labour Party, the reasons for which were often disputed. The Irish historian Diarmaid Ferriter suggests he was expelled for engaging in a public spat with a Catholic priest over the nature of socialism. Other sources suggest communists in Dublin, who had entered the Labour Party under the doctrine of entryism, had ousted him because they perceived him to be veering towards Trotskyism. Others, such as Noël Browne, suggested he had been expelled for "simply being too liberal".

In 1954 Sheehy-Skeffington moved into formal parliamentarian politics when was elected as a member of the 8th Seanad by the Dublin University constituency. He was re-elected in 1957, but lost his seat in 1961. He was returned to the 11th Seanad in 1965 and was re-elected for a final time in 1969. In the Seanad he was known as a champion of civil liberties and an opponent of authoritarianism.

Among many issues, he campaigned for an end to corporal punishment in Irish schools, an end of control by the Catholic Church of government-funded schools, stood against censorship, denounced terrorism, championed women's rights and opposed Apartheid.

On matters of the "Irish Question", Sheehy-Skeffington cited James Connolly's analysis and suggested both the Republic of Ireland and Northern Ireland each needed political reform first, then merged, rather than the other way around. Still citing Connolly, he also voiced the view that Irish independence from the United Kingdom meant nothing if all it amounted to was to change the colour of the flag flying over its institutions, and instead, the change must also be a meaningful change in conditions for the people of Ireland. He also noted that at least 4 of the 6 counties which made up Northern Ireland were made up of solid majorities of Protestant Unionists who he argued could not be coerced, by violence or otherwise, into the Irish state and that Republicans needed to accept this reality and alter their tactics accordingly, with more emphasis given to social conditions.

He was an atheist and helped set up the Humanist Association of Ireland. He was also a co-founder and active member of the Irish Association for Civil Liberty, which he co-founded in 1948 with the writer Seán Ó Faoláin and others.

In 1958, activist Peter Tyrrell wrote to Sheehy-Skeffington about the abuse he experienced in St Joseph's Industrial School in Letterfrack. This began a correspondence between them, lasting until Tyrrell's death, in which Tyrrell, at Sheehy-Skeffington's encouragement, wrote his autobiography. It was published in 2006 as Founded on Fear and helped expose the brutal conditions in Irish industrial schools, and in Letterfrack in particular. After Tyrrell committed suicide in 1967 the only clue to his identity was a card addressed to Sheehy-Skeffington.

On the eve of Sheehy-Skeffington's death the Arms Crisis was beginning to play out and one of Sheehy-Skeffington's final acts was to send a letter to Taoiseach Jack Lynch expressing support for his actions taken against Charles Haughey and Neil Blaney, dismissing them from cabinet.

== Death and legacy ==
Sheehy-Skeffington died suddenly on 7 June 1970 of a heart attack, triggering a by-election for his senate seat; on 19 November 1970 Trevor West was elected to fill the seat.

=== Memorial Award ===
Since 1973, Trinity College Dublin has offered the Owen Sheehy-Skeffington Memorial Award – a bursary worth €1,500 awarded annually – as a maintenance grant or as a travel award in alternate years. The criteria for the award include a combination of academic promise and financial need. The maintenance grant is available to senior freshmen or junior sophisters studying French at Trinity College, while the travelling scholarship may be granted to any student attending a centre of higher education in Ireland.

The National Library of Ireland houses Sheehy-Skeffington's papers.

== Family ==
His daughter, Micheline Sheehy Skeffington, challenged perceived gender inequality at NUI Galway.

== Sources ==
- Andrée Sheehy-Skeffington: Skeff: The Life of Owen Sheehy-Skeffington, 1909-1970 [biography written by his widow] (Dublin: Lilliput Press, 1991).
- Lilliput Press website page for Skeff
