= Richard O'Carroll =

Irish trade unionist and revolutionary

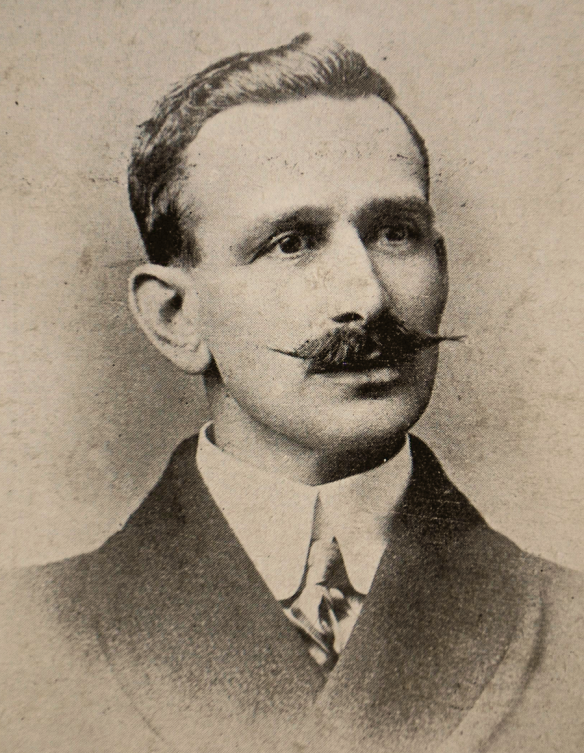

Dublin City Councilor
- In office 1907–1916
- Constituency: Mansion House Ward

Personal details
- Born: 29 February 1876 Dublin, Ireland
- Died: 5 May 1916 (aged 40) Portobello Infirmary, Dublin, Ireland
- Resting place: Glasnevin Cemetery, Dublin, Ireland
- Party: Sinn Féin, Labour Party
- Military career
- Allegiance: Irish Republic
- Branch: Irish Volunteers
- Service years: 1913-1916
- Rank: Lieutenant
- Units: 2nd Battalion, Dublin Brigade, Irish Volunteers
- Conflicts: Dublin Lockout; Easter Rising

Richard O'Carroll (29 February 1876 – 5 May 1916) was an Irish trade union leader, political activist and revolutionary, and founding member of the Irish Labour Party. He was also an early critic of child labour, particularly in the construction industry, and under his leadership the construction industry took a public stance against child labour for the first time.

== Political career ==
O'Carroll was a bricklayer by trade and General Secretary of the Ancient Guild of Incorporated Brick and Stonelayers Trade Union, (now the Building and Allied Trades Union) from 1906 until his death in 1916. Having been active in the Union since early in his career, as General Secretary, O'Carroll was instrumental in growing the Union outside Dublin for the first time in its history. By the time of his death the Union had local branches and a membership base across Ireland.

In 1907 O'Carroll was elected to Dublin City Council as an independent Councillor. Being a Union General Secretary, his political role was a complex and delicate one.

In 1911 Cllr. O'Carroll became a Poor Law Guardian on the South Dublin Poor Law Union Board. Vehemently opposed to the use of child labour in the building trade and exploitation of children in trade generally, he tabled a motion to the Board proposing that no Dublin City Council contracts be awarded to contractors who used child labour. He openly and vociferously criticised the South Dublin Poor Law Union after this motion was defeated. However, under O'Carroll's leadership the Ancient Guild of Incorporated Brick and Stonelayers Trade Union went on to publicly declare opposition to the exploitation of children in the building trade. This was an important and perhaps even a pioneering stance, considering the frequent use of child labour in the construction industry in 1911.

In 1912 O'Carroll became a founding member of the "Dublin Labour Party", the political wing of the Irish Trades Union Congress and a precursor to the modern-day Labour Party of Ireland. Previously he had been a member of Sinn Féin. That same year he also succeeded James Larkin as representative of the Dublin Labour Party on Dublin City Council. He continued in this role into 1913 and the period of tremendous industrial unrest during the Dublin lock-out. O'Carroll was on the conciliation board which played a key role in ending the lock-out, while also providing public support for the disenfranchised labourers who had been denied the right to unionise. A week after Bloody Sunday of 31 August 1913, during which he had been badly beaten by police at a secret Trade Union meeting, Cllr. O'Carroll addressed a large crowd on O'Connell Street along with Larkin and other key leaders. He urged the public to vote for Labour representation to improve the civil rights of workers.

Cllr. O'Carroll was re-elected to Dublin City Council on the Dublin Labour Party ticket again in 1915.

== 1916 Easter Rising and Death ==
O'Carroll was a member of the Irish Republican Brotherhood and the Irish Volunteers. He participated in the Easter Rising of 1916, fighting in the Camden Street area as a lieutenant of 2nd Battalion under the command of Thomas MacDonagh.

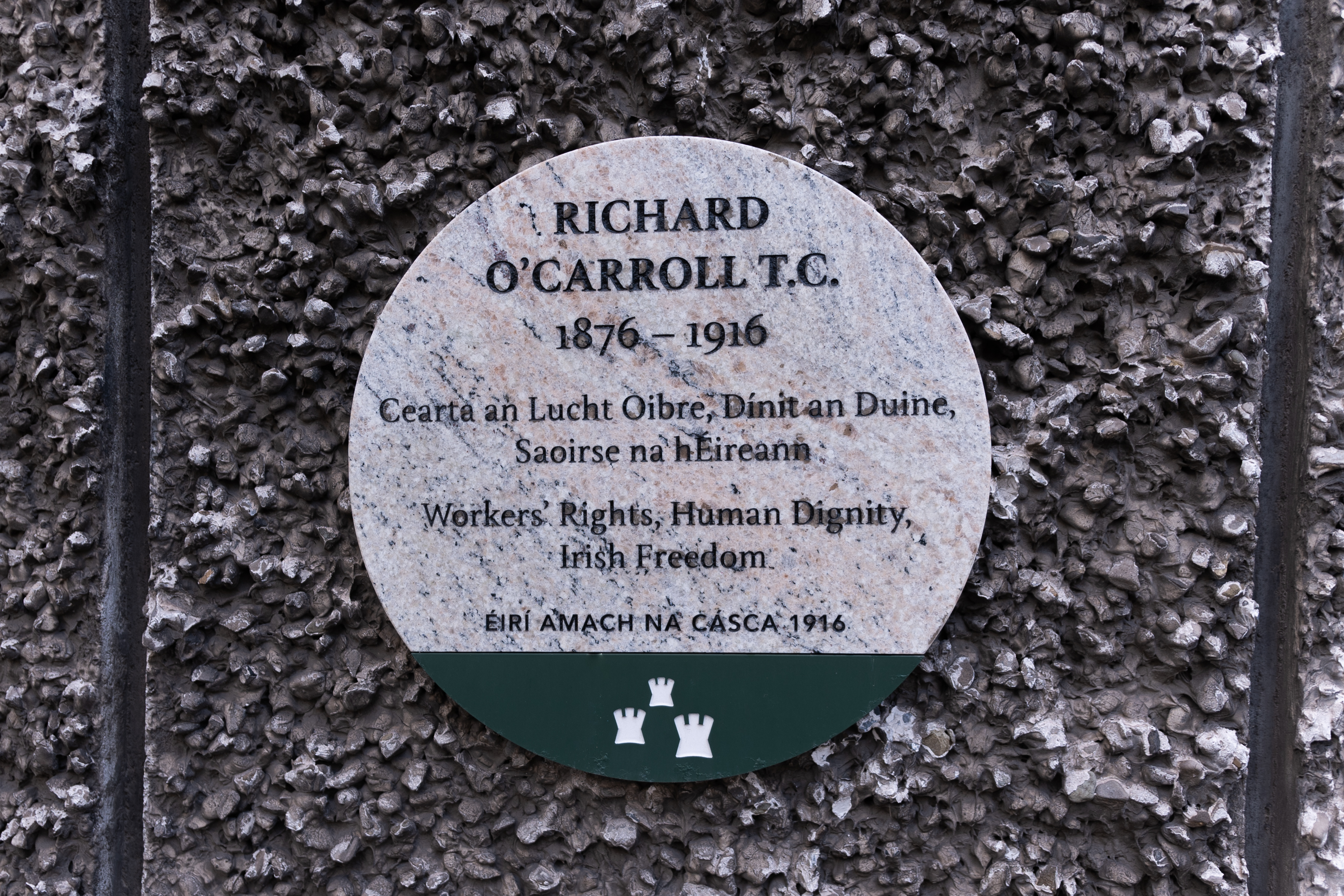
Richard O'Carroll plaque at Cuffe Street, Dublin 2.

On the afternoon of 26 April 1916, having summarily executed Francis Sheehy Skeffington with two innocent civilians at Portobello Barracks that morning, Captain John Bowen-Colthurst led a raid on suspected rebel hideouts in Camden Street. O'Carroll was found staked out above a shop, and was brought outside unarmed and with hands raised. Once outside, Bowen-Colthurst asked O'Carroll at gunpoint if he was a "Sinn Féiner". When O'Carroll's responded "from the backbone out", Bowen-Colthurst shot him in the stomach, wounding but not killing him. O'Carroll was taken to Portobello Infirmary in a passing delivery van which had to be commandeered, where he died slowly nine days later.

In his April 26 report of the day's events, Bowen-Colthurst claimed that O'Carroll had been attempting to escape when he was shot: "One other man (name unknown) was captured in Byrne's [shop] and as seditious (pro-German) literature was found on him and as he had arms in his possession he was made prisoner and placed in charge of Sergeant Kelly. Later Sergeant Kelly informed me that the man had attempted to escape but was fired upon, wounded and re-captured." A few days later, the Portobello orderly room began an internal inquiry into Colthurst's actions, including O'Carroll's shooting. Colthurst was overheard coaching a sergeant (presumably Kelly) to tell the investigating adjutant that 'The prisoner was trying to escape'.

After O'Carroll's murder the military authorities attempted to erase his name from the historical record: although Colthurst had been court-martialed and found 'Guilty but Insane' for the Portobello Barracks murders of the morning of April 26, during the trial there was no discussion of the subsequent shooting of O'Carroll that afternoon. Three months after the trial, a royal commission further examined the circumstances leading to Colthurst's crimes at Portobello Barracks. On the first day of these proceedings, the solicitor for the Sheehy-Skeffington family attempted to read the part of Colthurst's 26 April report that covered the execution of O'Carroll, but commission chairman Sir John Simon ruled that this was outside the scope of the inquiry and so could not be heard (perhaps because the execution took place on Camden Street rather than in the Barracks with the other executions).

Due to the fact that O'Carroll was not legally recognised as a casualty of the rebellion, his widow Eileen Power and their seven children were unable to secure special financial support for widows of servicemen from the Irish Free State after independence.

== Legacy ==
O'Carroll is buried in Glasnevin cemetery, alongside many of Ireland's nationalist leaders. In 1935 the National Graves Association and the Bricklayer's Union erected a new memorial tombstone, detailing his achievements for Ireland and commemorating his life. Furthermore, O'Carroll Villas on Cuffe Street in Dublin city centre was named after him, and in 2016 a plaque was unveiled by the Lord Mayor of Dublin at that location.

=== Richard O'Carroll Empowerment Bursary ===
The Labour Party has chosen to commemorate the life and legacy of Cllr O'Carroll by assisting young people in continuing their education with a bursary. The competition for the bursary of €2,000 runs annually, and it began in 2016.
