= List of biogeographical puzzles =

This is a list of taxa with unusual or unexplained distributions, including species whose ranges are distant from those of their closest relatives due to historical processes that remain unknown or disputed.

== Specific taxa ==
- Mammals
  - Falkland Islands wolf
  - Gansu mole
  - Pennant's colobus
- Birds
  - Elephant birds
  - Moa
  - Nicobar megapode
- Reptiles
  - Brachylophus
  - Lapitiguana
  - Phelsuma andamanense

== Assemblages of taxa ==
- Lusitanian flora
