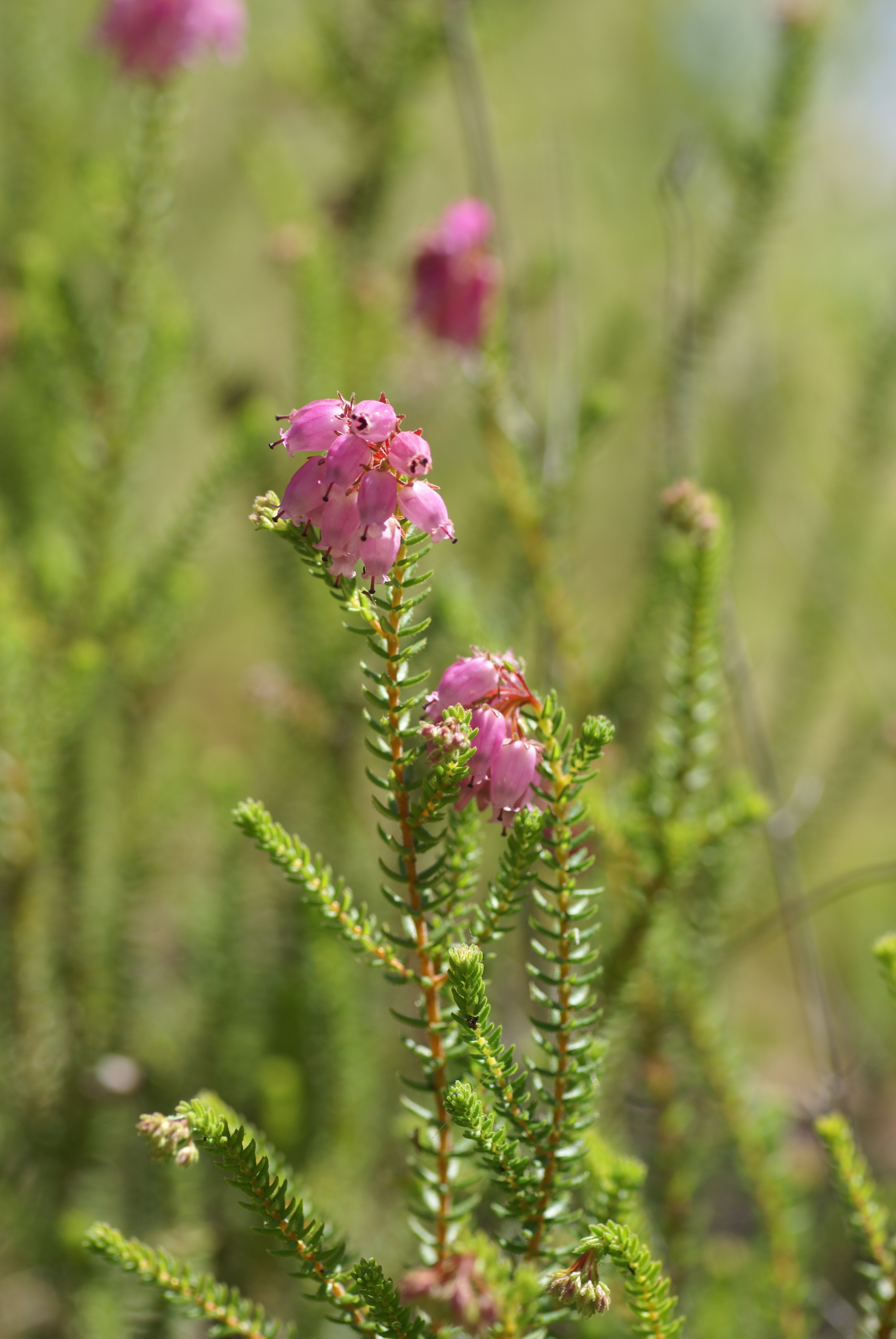

Scientific classification
- Kingdom: Plantae
- Clade: Tracheophytes
- Clade: Angiosperms
- Clade: Eudicots
- Clade: Asterids
- Order: Ericales
- Family: Ericaceae
- Genus: Erica
- Species: E. andevalensis

Binomial name
- Erica andevalensis Cabezudo & J.Rivera

Synonyms
- Erica mackayana subsp. andevalensis (Cabezudo & J.Rivera) D.C.McClint. & E.C.Nelson; Erica andevalensis f. albiflora D.C.McClint. & E.C.Nelson

= Erica andevalensis =

Species of flowering plant

Erica andevalensis is a species of erica that is native to the Iberian Peninsula, occurring in a small area between southeastern Portugal and southwestern Spain. The species is unusual in that it mostly occurs in metal-contaminated soils, often in mining areas.
