= Francis Sheehy-Skeffington =

Irish writer and activist (1878–1916)

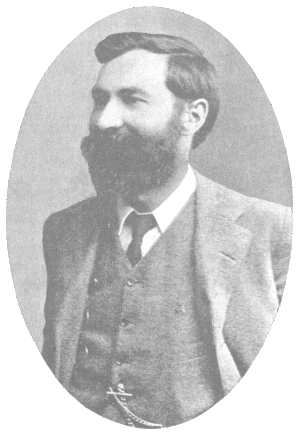
- Born: Francis Joseph Christopher Skeffington; 23 December 1878; Bailieborough, County Cavan
- Died: 26 April 1916 (aged 37); Portobello Barracks, Dublin
- Other names: Francis Skeffington, 'Skeffy'
- Education: University College Dublin
- Organization(s): United Irish League, Irish Women's Suffrage and Local Government Association, Irish Citizen Army
- Movement: Women's suffrage, Pacifism/Anti-conscription, Irish independence
- Spouse: Hanna Sheehy-Skeffington
- Children: Owen Sheehy-Skeffington

Francis Joseph Christopher Sheehy-Skeffington (né Skeffington; 23 December 1878 – 26 April 1916) was an Irish writer and radical activist well known in Dublin in the decade before the 1916 Easter Rising. Through his speeches and freelance journalism, Sheehy-Skeffington campaigned for socialism, feminism, and pacifism in Ireland.

He was also a supporter of Irish independence, which brought him to the attention of the British authorities in Dublin and ultimately led to his illegal execution during the Rising.

== Early life ==
Francis Skeffington was descended from Sir William Skeffington, who was appointed the Lord Deputy of Ireland by King Henry VIII. "Frank", as he was known to family and friends, was born in Bailieborough, County Cavan, and was raised in Downpatrick, County Down, the only son of Dr Joseph Bartholomew Skeffington, an inspector of National Schools, and his wife Rose (née Magorrian). Joseph and Rose were married in 1869 at the Catholic chapel at Ballykinlar on the County Down coast.

Francis was educated initially at home by his father, and later at the Jesuit school in St Stephen's Green, Dublin. He manifested an early sympathy for radical politics, as attested by his enthusiasm for the constructed language Esperanto. In 1893, at the age of 15, he wrote a letter to his local newspaper in County Down stating that "Gaelic" was irretrievably dead and "the study of Esperanto would be more useful to the youth of Ireland". Later in life he became fluent in the language, and had a number of Esperanto books in his library when he died. This enthusiasm was not unusual at the time in leftist circles, and several prominent leaders of the 1916 Easter rising, including James Connolly, were also Esperantists.

== Student years ==
In 1896 (aged 17), he enrolled in University College, then run by the Jesuits and located on St Stephen's Green in the centre of Dublin. He stayed at the college long enough to earn a master's degree. Skeffington was a well-known figure at the college, individualistic and unconventional in temperament. He was active in student politics and debating societies, including the Literary and Historical Society, which he revived in 1897.

His closest companions in his student days were James Joyce and Tom Kettle (the latter later became his brother-in-law). In protest against uniformity of dress, Skeffington refused to shave, and wore knickerbockers with long socks, which earned him the nickname "Knickerbockers". He was an ardent proponent of women's rights, and wore a Votes for Women badge. He was an equally ardent advocate of pacifism and vegetarianism, and he denounced smoking, drinking, and vivisection. But he did permit himself chocolate, and apparently he was often seen with a bar of milk chocolate in his pocket.

Joyce enrolled at University College in 1898; he was four years Skeffington's junior but only two classes below him. A number of Joyce's early writings known as "epiphanies", composed in 1901-02, are set in Hanna Sheehy's house and one includes Skeffington among those present. Joyce left a fictional portrait of Skeffington in his novel A Portrait of the Artist as a Young Man, under the guise of "MacCann", a fellow-student whom Joyce's alter-ego Stephen Dedalus describes as "a squat figure in a shooting jacket and breeches," with a "bluntfeatured face" and "a strawcolored goatee which hung from his blunt chin." Stephen remembers him saying: "Dedalus, you're an anti-social being, wrapped up in yourself. I'm not. I'm a democrat: and I'll work and act for social liberty and equality among all classes and sexes in the United States of the Europe of the future." Later, "MacCann" is seen standing in a lobby after class, canvassing signatures on a petition for universal peace, under a picture of the Czar of Russia, who was a proponent of disarmament. (In the spring term of that year Skeffington would attend the international peace conference called by the Czar.) "MacCann began to speak with fluent energy of the Czar's rescript, of Stead, of general disarmament, arbitration in cases of international disputes, of the signs of the times, of the new humanity and the new gospel of life which would make it the business of the community to secure as cheaply as possible the greatest possible happiness of the greatest possible number." – Stephen Dedalus expresses indifference to these goals and gestures at the picture of the Czar: "If we must have a Jesus, let us have a legitimate Jesus." To which MacCann replies: "Dedalus, I believe you're a good fellow, but you have yet to learn the dignity of altruism and the responsibility of the human individual."

Writing to his brother Stanislaus about the above passages, Joyce referred to Skeffington as "Hairy Jaysus", a comic expression which is both sardonic and affectionate.

In the autumn of 1901 Skeffington wrote an essay advocating equal status for women in the University, commissioned by St Stephen's, the new literary magazine of the college.

The essay was refused publication by the Censor, and, at Joyce's suggestion, Skeffington then published the essay as a pamphlet, along with another essay by Joyce himself, which had been similarly censored ("The Day of the Rabblement", a critique of the Irish Literary Theatre). Although Joyce and Skeffington disagreed with each other's politics, they both resented censorship, and agreed to co-finance the print run of 85 copies and distribute the pamphlet to newspapers and prominent Dubliners.

== Marriage and political career ==
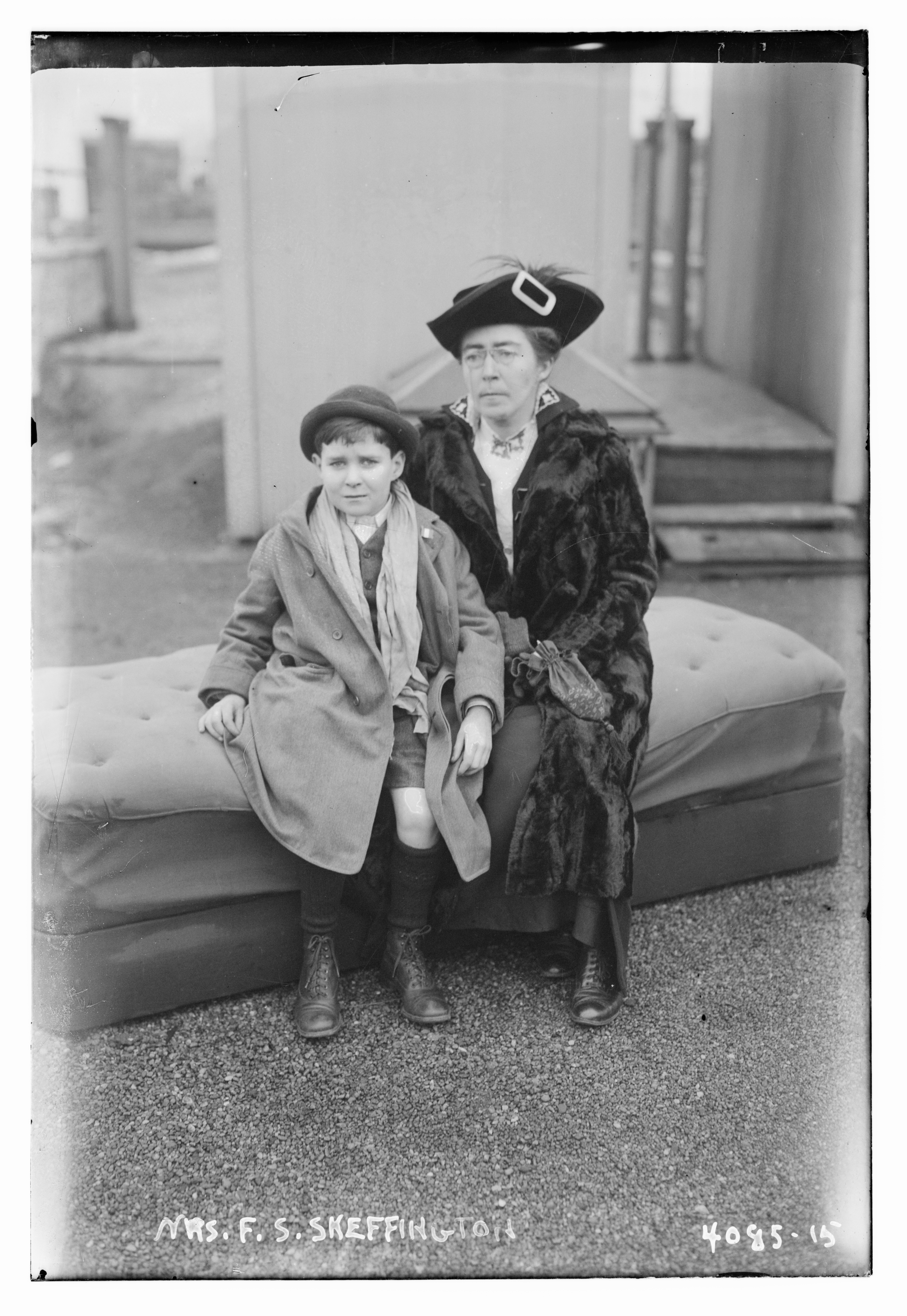
Hanna and Owen Sheehy-Skeffington, in 1916.

After graduating from University College, Skeffington worked as a freelance journalist, contributing to socialist and pacifist publications in Ireland, England, France and North America. In 1901-02 he taught in St Kieran's College in Kilkenny, where he was a colleague and friend of the school's English, French and history master Thomas MacDonagh; the two also lodged in the same house in Kilkenny City. He then took a job as the Registrar of University College.

On 26 June 1903 he married Hanna Sheehy, a teacher at the Rathmines College of Commerce (a forerunner of Dublin Institute of Technology). They jointly adopted the surname "Sheehy-Skeffington". Hanna's family were a prosperous farming and milling family in County Cork. Her father had been a Nationalist MP, and had been imprisoned no less than six times for revolutionary activities.

The couple joined the Irish Women's Suffrage and Local Government Association, and the Young Ireland Branch of the United Irish League (the constituency element of the Irish Parliamentary Party). They also supported the Women's Social and Political Union, which lobbied for women's rights in Britain. Shortly after they married, Francis organised a petition to lobby for women to be admitted to University College on the same basis as men. When the university refused to take that step, Francis resigned from his job as registrar in protest, relying on Hanna to support him for a time. He was President of the Socialist Party of Ireland.

In 1907, Francis wrote a novel, In Dark and Evil Days, which was published in 1916, after his death.

In 1908, he published a biography of the Irish nationalist and Land League agitator Michael Davitt.

In 1909 Francis and Hanna had a son, Owen. They were much criticised for refusing to have him baptised.

In April 1911, Francis took part in an amusing protest at a meeting of the Dublin Chamber of Commerce. The chamber was holding a public meeting to organise a welcoming ceremony for King George V on his visit to Dublin later that year. To open the meeting, the president of the chamber proposed that "a Citizens' Committee be formed for the purpose of arranging a suitable welcome and preparing and presenting a loyal address to the Most Gracious Majesties the King and Queen, on their approaching visit to Dublin". Francis counter-proposed that the word "not" be inserted after the words "be formed", and argued that ignoring the visit was the best compromise to satisfy both supporters and objectors to the visit. "Sean Milroy – a future minister in the Irish Free State – stood to second Sheehy Skeffington's motion, while the chairman, the Earl of Mayo, attempted to maintain order over cries of 'Hear hear!' and 'Put him out!' In an effort to silence the dissenters, Mayo called a vote on Sheehy Skeffington's amendment; 36 supported it while 'some hundreds' voted against." After this, Countess Markievicz proposed another counter-resolution which led to further uproar.

Francis was on friendly terms with Countess Markievicz: for instance he once escorted her to a police court after she had kicked a police officer during a Socialist Party meeting, which Francis had also attended.

In 1912, he and Hanna co-founded the Irish Women's Franchise League. He was made co-editor of the League's newspaper, The Irish Citizen. The Irish Women's Franchise League agitated for votes for women; members included his brother-in-law Tom Kettle and his friend Thomas MacDonagh, as well as all of the non-nationalist suffrage activists of the day. (Nationalist women tended to avoid it, on the basis that the IWFL was seeking to get into the British Parliament, while nationalists were trying to get out).

During the 1913 Dublin Lock-out, he became involved in the Citizens' Peace Committee, a group formed by various people including Tom Kettle and Thomas MacDonagh, with Joseph Plunkett as secretary, whose goal was to reconcile the employers and workers. The workers were willing to negotiate, but not the employers.

Francis Sheehy-Skeffington joined and then became a vice-chairman of the Irish Citizen Army when it was established in response to the lockout. But he lent his support on the understanding that the ICA would have a strictly defensive role; he resigned when it became a military entity.

Sheehy-Skeffington testified before a tribunal in 1913 as a witness to the arrest of the leading trade unionist Jim Larkin on O'Connell Street, and the subsequent police assault against a peaceful crowd, which had occurred on the last weekend of August 1913. His testimony stated that he was in the street with a group of women caring for a person who had already been assaulted by the police when a member of the Dublin Metropolitan Police charged towards this group with his baton raised. He reports that it was only because he called out the policeman's number that the man was dissuaded from the violence he had so clearly intended. He said that he was later abused by a gang of policemen showing clear signs of intoxication in the yard of the police station at College Green where he went to make his complaint, and that their officers had no control over their behaviour.

At the end of May 1915, Sheehy-Skeffington was arrested and charged with making speeches against recruitment. He was sentenced to six months in prison but immediately began a hunger strike and was released after six days under the terms of the "Cat and Mouse Act".

Countess Markievicz opposed Sheehy-Skeffington’s support of Henry Ford’s 1915 peace crusade. Sheehy-Skeffington challenged her to a debate on whether the war should be ended and she accepted the challenge in an open letter published in James Connolly's newspaper, The Workers' Republic. In the ensuing debate (18 February 1916), Markievicz’s argument for continuing the war was ineffective but in the open discussion afterwards, Connolly forcefully made the point that patriots should seize the opportunity provided by the war to fight for Irish independence, a view endorsed by the crowd at the meeting.

== Easter Rising ==
Francis Sheehy-Skeffington was executed during Ireland's 1916 Easter Rising and he has sometimes been considered one of its martyrs. In his biography of James Joyce, Richard Ellmann wrote that Sheehy-Skeffington "died at the hands of the British ... when he quixotically tried to dissuade the soldiers from looting". But Sheehy-Skeffington's death was really the unlucky consequence of Dublin Castle's suspicion that he was a Sinn Fein conspirator and Captain John Bowen-Colthurst's belligerence towards suspected rebel sympathisers. Timothy Healy's opinion was that Sheehy-Skeffington was shot because he was a witness to Bowen-Colthurst's murder of James Coade.

=== Political background ===
Francis Sheehy-Skeffington supported Home Rule for Ireland. After 1913 he also supported his friend Thomas MacDonagh's more separatist Irish Volunteers; however he grew increasingly critical of the Volunteers' growing militarism, and in an open letter to MacDonagh published in 1915 in his own paper The Irish Citizen, Sheehy-Skeffington wrote: "As you know, I am personally in full sympathy with the fundamental objects of the Irish Volunteers ... [however,] as your infant movement grows, towards the stature of a full-grown militarism, its essence – preparation to kill – grows more repellent to me."

At the outset of the Easter Rising, Sheehy-Skeffington opposed the violent methods of the insurgents, advocating a nonviolent form of civil disobedience, while his wife Hanna actively sympathized with the insurgents and joined the women who brought food to those stationed at the General Post Office and the Royal College of Surgeons. In contrast, on the first day of the Rising (Monday 24 April 1916) Francis risked crossfire to aid an English soldier outside Dublin Castle. As Hanna recalled six years later: "When the outbreak began on Easter Monday my husband was near Dublin Castle. He learned that a British officer had been gravely wounded and was bleeding to death on the cobblestones outside the Castle gate. My husband persuaded a bystander to go with him to the rescue. Together they ran across the square under a hail of fire. Before they reached the spot, however, some British troops rushed out and dragged the wounded man to cover inside the gate."

=== Attempts to prevent looting ===
Shortly after that incident, Sheehy-Skeffington was seen climbing up onto the steps of Nelson's Pillar on Sackville Street and calling upon a group of inner-city paupers to stop looting shops. He was hooted and jeered. His next move was to cross the street, enter the GPO, and demand to speak to James Connolly, one of the principal leaders of the insurrection, who was also a labour leader and sympathetic to Sheehy-Skeffington's socialism. Connolly sent out some armed men to quell the looting. The men climbed an overturned tramcar to berate the looters and fired shots over the looters' heads.

The next morning, 25 April, Sheehy-Skeffington went back into the city centre and tried to stop the looting. He returned to the GPO, emerging around one o'clock, and began pasting up a typewritten flyer. The flyer read:

When there are no regular police in the streets, it becomes the duty of citizens to police the streets themselves and to prevent such spasmodic looting as has been taking place in a few streets. Civilians (men and women) who are willing to co-operate to this end are asked to attend at Westmoreland Chambers (over Eden Bros.) at five o'clock this (Tues.) afternoon.

Sheehy-Skeffington then visited various people, including priests, to enlist their help in guarding specific shops. That afternoon he had tea with his wife in one of the tea shops which were still open in the city centre. Hanna then returned home to mind their child Owen, and Francis went to his meeting. The meeting was poorly attended and no one volunteered to help Francis stop the looting.

=== Arrest ===
On his way home, he was followed by a crowd of hecklers who were shouting out his nickname, "Skeffy!" This crowd was made up of inner city poor whom he had been exhorting to refrain from looting and who probably knew him from his speeches on feminism or socialism on the steps of the Custom House. As he and his hecklers approached the Portobello Bridge, around 7:30 p.m., they were intercepted by soldiers of the 11th East Surrey Regiment. Lieutenant Morris, the officer in charge, was under orders to keep the road and bridge clear, and felt apprehensive about the disorderly crowd. Morris, who had been shown a picture and description of Sheehy-Skeffington, arrested him and had two soldiers escort him to Portobello Barracks. At the barracks, the adjutant, Lieutenant Morgan (an old school chum) interviewed Sheehy-Skeffington. He told Morgan that he sympathized with the insurgents’ cause, but he was not a Sinn Feiner and was opposed to violence. Unsure how to proceed, Morgan telephoned the garrison adjutant who told him to detain Sheehy-Skeffington for further questioning. Just before 9:00 pm, Captain Bowen-Colthurst searched Sheehy-Skeffington and confiscated papers from him.

Captain John Colthurst Bowen-Colthurst (1880–1965) was an officer of the reserve 3rd Battalion of Royal Irish Rifles and belonged to an old Anglo-Irish and Protestant Ascendancy family with an extensive estate in County Cork. After attending Haileybury College and Sandhurst, he began his military career in the Second Anglo-Boer War. Later, during an eight-year posting in India, he served with distinction as the head of a machine-gun unit with the 1904 Younghusband Tibet Expedition. About 1905, Bowen-Colthurst became an evangelical Christian.

At the start of World War I, Bowen-Colthurst spent five weeks with the British Expeditionary Force on the Western Front (14 August–19 September 1914), from which he had been sent home wounded and possibly shell-shocked. He had had a brief mental breakdown during the Retreat from Mons and had initiated a disastrous, premature attack at the First Battle of the Aisne. Aside from his wounds, this behaviour perhaps ensured he was sent home from the front permanently. After a period of convalescence and light duties, Bowen-Colthurst had been assigned in July 1915 to the Royal Irish Rifles at Portobello Barracks, where his primary duties were training and recruitment.

About 10:30 p.m. on the second day of the Rising (25 April), Captain Bowen-Colthurst took Sheehy-Skeffington out of the barracks, as a hostage for a raiding party on the tobacconist shop of Alderman James Kelly, a moderate 'home rule' nationalist. (Bowen-Colthurst’s superior, Major Rosborough, ordered the raid on the shop in the belief that it was the home of the Sinn Fein politician, Alderman Tom Kelly.)

The raiding party consisted of an officer (Lieutenant Leslie Wilson) and 40 men led by Bowen-Colthurst, along with Sheehy-Skeffington who had his hands tied behind his back. Before leaving the barracks, Bowen-Colthurst ordered Sheehy-Skeffington to say his last prayers in case he might become a casualty, and when Sheehy-Skeffington refused, Bowen-Colthurst said prayers on his behalf. The troops left the barracks and headed towards Rathmines Road, where they encountered three young people loitering opposite the Church of Mary Immaculate, Refuge of Sinners. On the pretext of the lateness of the hour and that martial law had been proclaimed, Bowen-Colthurst detained and interrogated the three young men. He then impetuously shot one of them: a 19-year-old mechanic named James Coade. Coade was initially left in the road but later that evening, picked up and taken to Portobello Barracks infirmary, where he died early the next morning without regaining consciousness. Sheehy-Skeffington witnessed the shooting but Lieutenant Wilson testified at the subsequent Royal Commission that he did not hear Sheehy-Skeffington make any protest.

The soldiers continued down the Lower Rathmines Road and they stopped at the Portobello Bridge, where half of the men (under Wilson), along with Sheehy-Skeffington, were left at a guardhouse. Bowen-Colthurst ordered the troops at the guardhouse to monitor the further progress of the raiding party, and if snipers attacked either his or Wilson's men, Wilson was to shoot Sheehy-Skeffington.

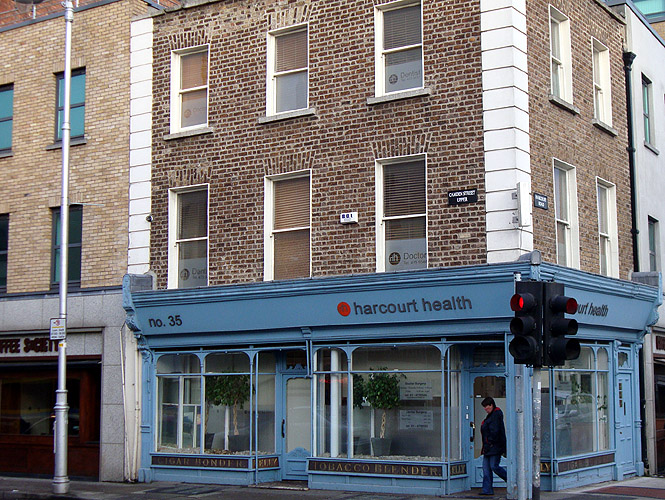
The shop at Kelly's Corner, photographed in 2009

Bowen-Colthurst's troops made their way three hundred yards along the road to Alderman James Kelly's shop (and home), which they stormed and destroyed with grenades. The soldiers also captured two men who had taken refuge in the shop, Thomas Dickson and Patrick McIntyre, both journalists. They and Sheehy-Skeffington were then escorted back to Portobello Barracks and lodged in prison cells.

=== Summary execution ===
Just after ten on the morning of 26 April, Bowen-Colthurst came to the guardroom and ordered Dickson, McIntyre and Sheehy-Skeffington taken out to an adjacent exercise yard. He announced his intentions to Lieutenant Dobbin, the officer in charge of the guardroom, telling him: "I am taking these prisoners out of the guard room [and] I am going to shoot them. I think it is the right thing to do." He then assembled a squad of seven men in the yard and ordered them to shoot the three prisoners, who until that moment were not aware they were about to die. After killing the three men, the firing squad immediately left the yard, but when movement was detected in Sheehy-Skeffington's leg, Bowen-Colthurst ordered Lieutenant Dobbin to gather another group of four soldiers to fire another volley into him. About half an hour later, after informing the orderly room of his actions, Bowen-Colthurst reported the shootings to Major Rosborough. He said he took responsibility for them and, aware that shooting prisoners was a capital offence, he added that he "possibly might be hanged for it". Rosborough asked him for a written report, and later on, issued instructions that Bowen-Colthurst be limited to duties within the barracks.

Immediately after informing Rosborough of the shootings, Bowen-Colthurst led a raid on a suspected rebel hideout in Camden Street. A three-man patrol of Bowen-Colthurst's troops captured Councillor Richard O'Carroll, a lieutenant in the I.R.B., alone in a room above Byrne's grocery shop and O'Carroll quickly surrendered. Bowen-Colthurst briefly interrogated him and then had him taken out to the street and shot by one of the company sergeants, in front of a crowd of onlookers and soldiers. O'Carroll did not die immediately but was taken to Portobello Infirmary, where he died ten days later. There is evidence that a teenaged I.R.B. informant, Patrick Nolan, was also shot during this raid. However, unlike O'Carroll, he was taken to hospital and survived his injuries.

=== Captain Bowen-Colthurst's reasons ===
Months later, when Countess Markievicz – then in Mountjoy Prison — first heard of the executions of the leaders of the Easter Rising, she asked: "Why on earth did they shoot Skeffy? He didn't believe in fighting." Bowen-Colthurst himself provided an answer to this question in his operations report of 26 April, the day of the shootings. Addressed to the Officer Commanding 3rd Battalion, part of his report was as follows:

This morning at about 9 a.m. I proceeded to the Guard Room to examine these two men and I sent for them and for a man called Skeffongton [sic] who was also detained. I had been busy on the previous evening up to about 3 a.m. examining documents found on these men and I recognised from these documents that the three men were all very dangerous characters. I therefore sent for an armed guard of six men and ordered them to load their Rifles and keep their eyes on the prisoners. The Guard Room was full of men and was not a suitable place in my opinion in which to examine the prisoners. I ordered therefore the three prisoners to go into the small court yard of the Guard Room. I regret that I did not have these men hand cuffed and surrounded as the yard was a place from which they might have escaped. When I ordered these three men into the yard I did not however know this. The Guard was some little distance from the prisoners and as I considered that there was a reasonable chance of the prisoners making their escape and knowing the three prisoners (from correspondence captured on them the previous evening ) to be dangerous characters, I called upon the Guard to fire upon them which they did with effect, the three men being killed. The documents found on these three men have been forwarded to the orderly room.

On 9 May, Bowen-Colthurst provided a second account to the commanding officer of the battalion with a more anxious tone. This was three days after Bowen-Colthurst's arrest and just before his arraignment on murder/manslaughter charges. The 9 May report in part read as follows:

On Tuesday evening, 25th ultimo, I was officially informed that martial law was declared in Dublin. There were three leaders of the rebels in the guard room in Portobello Barracks. The guard room was not safe for these desperate men to be confined in, their rescue from outside would be very easy.

On Tuesday and up to Wednesday morning rumours of massacres of police and soldiers from all parts of Dublin were being constantly sent to me from different sources... I also heard that the rebels in the city had opened up depots for the supply and issue of arms, and that a large force of rebels intended to attack Portobello Barracks, which was held only by a few troops...I believed that it was known that these leaders were confined in the barracks, and that possibly the proposed attack on the barracks was with view to their release... I had no knowledge of any reinforcements arriving from England, and did not believe it possible for troops to arrive in time to prevent a general massacre. I knew of the sedition which had been preached in Ireland for years past and of the popular sympathy with rebellion... On the Wednesday morning 26 April all this was in my mind. I was very much exhausted and unstrung after practically a sleepless night, and I took the gloomiest view of the situation and felt that only desperate measures would save the situation. When I saw the position described in my previous report I felt I must act quickly, and believing I had the power under martial law, I felt, under the circumstances, that it was clearly my duty to have the ring-leaders shot. It was a terrible ordeal for me, but I nerved myself to carry out what was for me at the time a terrible duty.

There was another possible explanation for Colthurst's actions, mentioned in passing in the report of the subsequent Royal Commission [on the Arrest ... Sheehy Skeffington...Dickson...McIntyre]. This was the suggestion that "a shooting incident" [Coade's murder] at which "Sheehy Skeffington was present ... might have had some bearing upon his subsequent treatment."

=== Burial and coverup ===
When Bowen-Colthurst had informed him of the shootings, Rosborough asked the barracks adjutant to telephone both the Garrison Adjutant at Dublin Castle and HQ Irish Command. Shortly after, Dublin Castle sent instructions to wrap the men in sheets (coffins were in short supply) and bury them within the barracks. This was done at 11:15 p.m. (26 April) with Father O'Loughlin, the military chaplain, in attendance. (The bodies were later reinterred, Sheehy-Skeffington at Glasnevin Cemetery on 8 May 1916.)

On Sunday, 30 April, under 'instruction' from Major Guinness, R.E., labourers replaced the damaged bricks in the wall where the men were shot. (The wall had been cleaned of blood stains on the afternoon of 26 April.)

According to a 1935 letter from a 'Father Scannell' to Hanna Sheehy-Skeffington, Bowen-Colthurst himself had made "frantic efforts to wipe out all the traces of his crime". Father Scannell alleged that Bowen-Colthurst detained several bricklayers from a nearby building site, and ordered them to repair the broken and bullet-impacted bricks in the wall behind where the executed men had stood.

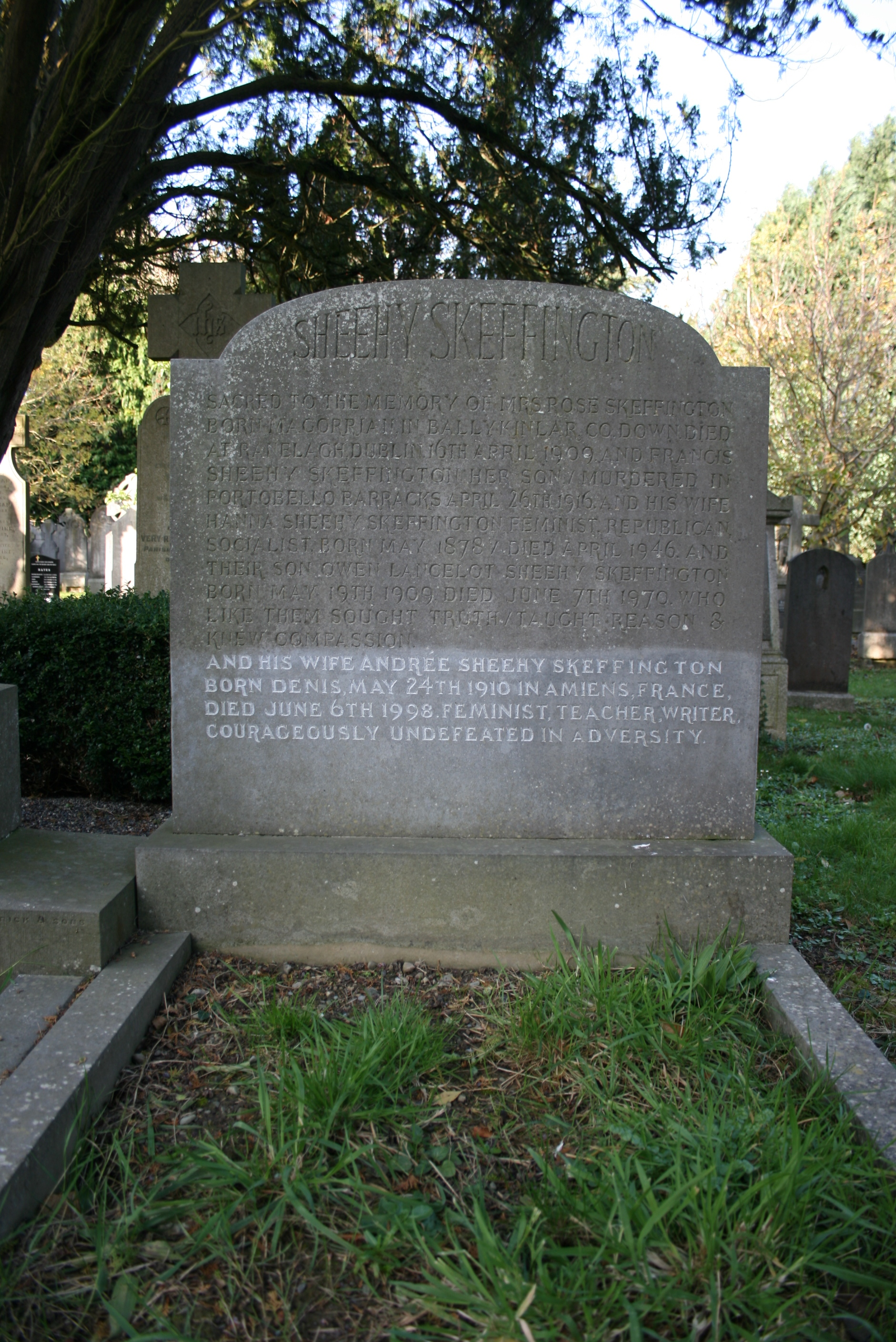
The grave of Francis and Hanna Sheehy-Skeffington, Glasnevin Cemetery, Dublin.

=== Denial and raid ===
Hanna Sheehy-Skeffington was not initially told about her husband's detention or his death. She went around Dublin seeking to find where her husband was, and heard rumours of his fate. Her two sisters then offered to visit Portobello Barracks on Friday, April 28, and make inquiries. Upon revealing their business, the two sisters were threatened with arrest as "Sinn Féiners", and questioned by Captain Bowen-Colthurst. Bowen-Colthurst denied any knowledge as to the fate of Francis Sheehy-Skeffington, and had them escorted out of the barracks. Later on Friday, Hanna learned the dreadful news from the father of James Coade, and the news was confirmed to her by Father O'Loughlin.

That same Friday evening, Bowen-Colthurst and a group of soldiers forced entry into the Sheehy-Skeffingtons' home, hoping to find evidence to incriminate Francis as an enemy sympathiser. The soldiers announced their presence with a volley of bullets through the front windows before storming into the house with fixed bayonets. They kept Hanna, Owen (then aged seven) and a maid-servant under guard for three hours while they ransacked the rooms. A large quantity of books and papers were wrapped in the household linen, placed in a commandeered passing car and taken away for examination. (None of the material was subsequently found to be seditious.) The maid, terrified by the ordeal, quit her job.

Three days later (1 May), there was a second raid on the house when only the replacement maid-servant was on the premises. This foray, which did not involve Bowen-Colthurst, was inconsequential, except for the unfortunate maid who was arrested and detained for five days.

=== Sir Francis Vane ===
Major Sir Francis Vane was in charge of Portobello Barracks defences at the outbreak of the Easter Rebellion. At the time of the Portobello shootings, he had been setting up an observation post at the top of Rathmines Town Hall. He returned to the barracks in the evening and was horrified to learn what had happened. He stressed to Rosborough the critical importance of confining Bowen-Colthurst's activities to the barracks, and he delivered a stern lecture on martial law and its limitations to the barracks officers.

But Vane was an irritant to his military superiors. When Colonel McCammond, the Portobello Barracks commander, returned from sick leave on 1 May, he removed responsibility for Portobello's defences from Vane and appointed Bowen-Colthurst in his stead. Vane objected and then tried to arrange a meeting with General Maxwell, commander-in-chief in Ireland, at his HQ but had to content himself with talking to the Chief Intelligence Officer, Major Price. Vane told Price about the events at Portobello but he was not happy with Price's response.

=== Court martial of Bowen-Colthurst ===
Vane travelled to London and on 3 May he met the Secretary of State for War, Lord Kitchener, in Downing Street. A telegram was sent to General Maxwell, ordering the arrest of Bowen-Colthurst, who was preparing to conduct a 55-man detachment to Newry Barracks when the order came through (6 May) that he be placed under 'open' arrest. On 11 May he was placed under "close arrest". Bowen-Colthurst was charged with the murders of Dickson, McIntyre and Sheehy-Skeffington, but to be tried by court martial, despite Section 41 of the Army Act which required that any soldier charged with murder committed in the United Kingdom could be tried only in a civil, not a military court.

Four days before the court martial, Dr R. Leeper and Dr A. Parsons assessed Bowen-Colthurst's mental condition. During the examination, talking about the shootings at the barracks, Bowen-Colthurst recalled his activities on the night of 25 April, after the raid on Kelly's was completed and his prisoners had been secured in cells. He said that he had gone to bed at three o'clock in the morning but stayed up till four reading his Bible, focusing in particular on the verse from St. Luke (19:27): 'And these my enemies which will not have me to rule over them, bring them forth and slay them.' This passage and its apparent effect on Bowen-Colthurst subsequently became part of Dr Parsons's medical testimony at the court martial.

The court martial took place 6/7 June at Richmond Barracks, Dublin. Major-General, Lord Cheylesmore (Herbert Eaton, 3rd Baron Cheylesmore) was the President of the Court and there were over a hundred spectators. Timothy Healy and P. A. O'Connor White attended on behalf of Hanna Sheehy-Skeffington but they took no part in the proceedings. Bowen-Colthurst pleaded 'Not guilty'. Testifying about the circumstances of the shootings, several witnesses described Bowen-Colthurst as being 'excited', 'very excited', or 'highly excited'. Once the prosecution and defence counsel had established the uncontested facts of the case, a succession of army officers testified to Bowen-Colthurst's kindness and decency but also to his occasional eccentricity, excitability and impulsiveness. Major General Wilkinson Bird, Bowen-Colthurst's commander in the British Expeditionary Force, described his nervous breakdown during the Retreat from Mons.

Four expert medical witnesses agreed on Bowen-Colthurst's past (August 1914 – April 1915) and current mental fragility, but they were less certain about his mental condition on the day of the shootings. Dr Leeper testified that he could not give an opinion on Bowen-Colthurst's 26 April mental state because he had not been there at the time. The authors of the medical report, Captain Lawless and Major Purser, said that while it was impossible to say positively what Bowen-Colthurst's mental condition was on 26 April, they had no doubt that at the present time he was mentally unsound. Captain Lawless said that it was highly probable that Bowen-Colthurst's mental state on 26 April had been the same as his present condition, and he did not think that Bowen-Colthurst was responsible for his actions on that date. Major Purser concurred with this opinion.

Defence counsel argued that since the character witnesses had said that he was by nature kind and honourable, Bowen-Colthurst must have been insane when he executed the three prisoners, particularly in the light of 'an unbalanced tendency in the prisoner's mind' that had been evident for a number of years. At the culmination of his closing address, defence counsel attempted to establish that Bowen-Colthurst was deranged on the night before the barracks shooting. He said Bowen-Colthurst's taking Sheehy-Skeffington hostage was 'the strangest thing any man of sixteen years' experience in the army could do... the act of a man whose mind was completely unstrung.' Defence counsel also said that Bowen-Colthurst's rifle firing in the air during the raid on Kelly's showed that he had completely lost his reason. Both statements rested on premises that turned out to be false. Hostage taking was not, in fact, unknown in the British army and Bowen-Colthurst was not firing his rifle wildly in the air on the way to Kelly's shop. Bowen-Colthurst did not testify at the court martial.

In his closing address, the prosecutor asked the court to consider Bowen-Colthurst's mental state at the time of the shootings. He said that witnesses had described Bowen-Colthurst as impulsive and excited, but that impulsiveness and excitement were not the same as insanity. The prosecutor noted that the onus of proof for an insanity defence lay on the accused, but that there was no evidence Bowen-Colthurst had not been able to distinguish right from wrong, and that he knew what he was doing when he ordered the men to be shot.

In his summary, the judge advocate reviewed the evidence and explained the possible verdicts, including the conditions required for a finding of 'guilty but insane'. Bowen-Colthurst's service record was then read out, highlighting his South Africa Medal and his medal for service in the British expedition to Tibet of 1904. At the request of defence counsel, the Adjutant read into the record that Captain Colthurst and his machine-gun detachment were mentioned in dispatches during the Tibet Expedition, and the proceedings concluded.

Three days after the trial, it was officially announced that Bowen-Colthurst had been found guilty, but insane at the time he committed the murders. He was sentenced to indefinite detention in an insane asylum and admitted to Broadmoor Asylum for the Criminally Insane on 4 July.

There were doubts about the impartiality of the court martial. Hanna Sheehy-Skeffington's solicitor wrote to Prime Minister Asquith to complain about the prosecutor's conduct of the case. Though Rosborough’s testimony alluded to Bowen-Colthurst's 26 April report, the court ignored this document. There was no mention of Coade. Similarly off limits were Bowen-Colthurst's actions after the executions, most notably the murder of Richard O'Carroll. Important witnesses (Colonel McCammond, Lieutenants Tooley and Gibbon, Sergeant Claxton and others), who might have provided different views of Bowen-Colthurst's character and mental state, were not summoned to give evidence. Most importantly, the medical evidence had not clearly established Bowen-Colthurst's insanity at the time of the shootings, the standard of proof for insanity required by Chapter VII (Section 9) of the Manual of Military Law.

=== Royal Commission ===
Hanna Sheehy-Skeffington was not happy with the process or the verdict of the court martial. She lobbied Irish MPs and she badgered Prime Minister Asquith into holding a formal inquiry into Bowen-Colthurst's actions and the army's response. The Royal Commission on the Arrest... and subsequent treatment... of Sheehy Skeffington... Dickson and...McIntyre was chaired by Sir John Simon (a former Attorney General and Home Secretary), and held hearings on 23–31 August 1916 in a public courtroom at the Four Courts in Dublin. Thirty-eight witnesses were examined, including Hanna Sheehy-Skeffington. The report of this Commission constitutes the principal source of facts about the events leading to the death of Sheehy-Skeffington. Though much of the evidence presented at the oral hearings did not appear in the final report, the oral hearings were well reported in the Dublin newspapers.

The Royal Commission examined the circumstances of Dickson's, McIntyre's and Sheehy-Skeffington's deaths but not why they were killed. The Commission chairman's view was that as a court martial had already determined that Bowen-Colthurst was insane, there could be no further discussion of his mental state and motives. However, the Commission report did present a plausible narrative of Bowen-Colthurst's actions.

The evidence presented to the Commission was much the same as the testimony at the court martial. But during the Commission hearings, the murder of James Coade was brought to light. Timothy Healy, counsel for the Sheehy-Skeffington family, established that Sheehy-Skeffington had witnessed Coade's killing. Mr J. P. Brennan, solicitor for Patrick McIntyre, established that Sheehy-Skeffington had had the opportunity to talk to Dickson and McIntyre while they were being escorted back to Portobello Barracks. However, the Commission reported that it was unable to arrive at any conclusions about a possible link between Coade's and Sheehy-Skeffington's murders.

The crucial court martial testimony of Lieutenant Leslie Wilson, who had accompanied Bowen-Colthurst on the raid on Kelly's, was shown to have been unreliable. Wilson also told the commission panel that he thought it was quite legal to use Sheehy-Skeffington as a hostage and did not consider the instruction to shoot him if Colthurst's party was fired on as 'strange'. The Commission determined that Bowen-Colthurst's account (in his April 26 report) of the shootings at the barracks was 'entirely untrue'. Regarding Bowen-Colthurst's captives, the Commission report noted that 'No documents or correspondence whatever were found on the prisoners that showed them to be "dangerous characters"; and that any documents found on them could be thoroughly examined in a few minutes'

The Commission also examined Bowen-Colthurst's second (9 May) report, a more personal account of his actions than the 26 April report. In his 9 May report, Bowen-Colthurst wrote of the precarious position of the undermanned Portobello Barracks, being threatened by rebel forces who might rescue the three rebel 'ringleaders' from the guard room. Bowen-Colthurst then described his own precarious mental condition at the time as 'very much exhausted and unstrung after a practically sleepless night.' He wrote that he believed he had the power under martial law to have the three prisoners shot, and he ended his report by describing the shootings as 'a terrible duty'. The Commissioners dismissed his claim that the three men might escape from the guard room, and they addressed his (and others') misunderstanding of martial law in the conclusions of their report.

The Commission's report documented the raids on Dickson's and Sheehy-Skeffington's houses. Rosborough authorised the first raid, on Dickson's house early in the evening of 26 April. Captain Murphy with two officers and 25 men conducted the operation. Bowen-Colthurst took part in the second raid, nominally led by Colonel Allatt, on Sheehy-Skeffington's house on the evening of 28 April. The Commission determined that this was the occasion Bowen-Colthurst found the allegedly incriminating document that he certified as being found on Sheehy-Skeffington when he was arrested. The Commission report characterized both raids as disreputable attempts to find evidence to justify the shootings after the fact.

An issue that was not discussed by the Commission panel was the shooting of Richard O'Carroll two hours after the shootings at Portobello. Bowen-Colthurst dealt with this briefly (without naming O'Carroll) in the second half of his 26 April report. Sir John Simon stopped Healy from reading the relevant part of the report into the record (but not before Healy had identified O'Carroll as the victim), ruling that it was outside the terms of reference of the Commission.

Timothy Healy asked Colonel McCammond why 'having taken the view that the prisoners were shot in the wrong', he allowed Bowen-Colthurst to remain [29 April-6 May] in his command? The Court ruled that this question also was outside the Commission's terms of reference.

Healy attempted to have Bowen-Colthurst brought to testify at the Commission hearings. In their report, the Commissioners noted that as he was confined in Broadmoor Criminal Lunatic Asylum, they felt themselves 'debarred from taking his evidence'.

The Commission report concluded with three 'general observations'. In the first, the Commission absolved Irish Command of responsibility for the murders, declaring itself 'satisfied that the state of things which rendered Captain Bowen-Colthurst's conduct possible was largely caused by the unfortunate but inevitable absence through serious illness of Colonel McCammond, the only officer in the barracks whom Captain Colthurst would not have considered himself at liberty to ignore.'

In its second observation, the report singled out Colthurst's 28 April raid on Mrs Sheehy-Skeffington's house as being particularly discreditable, especially in the light of his earlier treatment of Mrs Sheehy-Skeffington's sisters at Portobello Barracks.

The army authorities had been understandably nervous about Bowen-Colthurst's court martial and its ramifications. The Manual of Military Law advocated the ruthless suppression of insurrection and conditionally offered an 'Act of Indemnity' to any soldier for any illegal acts committed while martial law was in effect. In its third observation, the Commissioners attempted to distance the army authorities from the apparent misapplication of martial law by Bowen-Colthurst. Their report ascribed the complicity of the soldiers involved in Bowen-Colthurst's misconduct to a misunderstanding of martial law. The Commission report concluded with an admonition:

The shooting of unarmed and unresisting civilians without trial constitutes the offence of murder, whether martial law has been proclaimed or not. We should have deemed it superfluous to point this out were it not that the failure to realise and apply this elementary principle seems to explain the free hand which Captain Bowen-Colthurst was not restrained from exercising throughout the period of crisis.

=== Aftermath ===
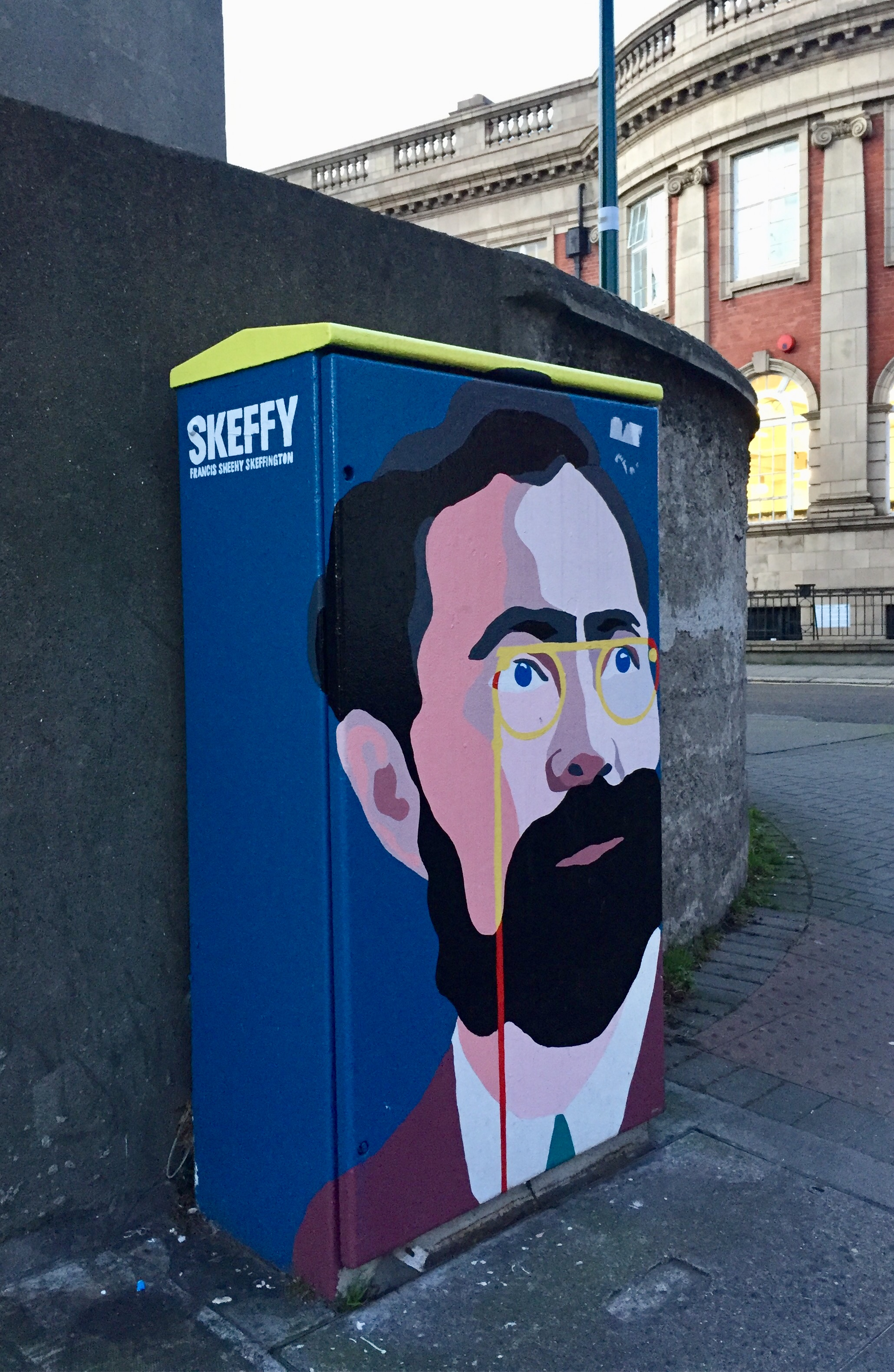
Francis Sheehy Skeffington, depicted on street art in Dublin, in the neighborhood of Rathmines where he lived and where he was killed.

Major Sir Francis Vane, who had sought to have Bowen-Colthurst brought to justice, was dishonourably discharged from the British Army in late May 1916, owing to an adverse report filed by General Maxwell about Vane's actions in the Skeffington murder case. He went on to be involved with the Boy Scouts, then retired from public life in 1927 and died in 1934.

Captain Bowen-Colthurst spent 19 months at Broadmoor Hospital but he did not change his views on how to deal with suspected rebels. He was released under medical supervision on 26 January 1918 and provided with a military pension. Bowen-Colthurst emigrated in April 1919 to the Canadian province of British Columbia, where he lived until his death in 1965. After a funeral at Our Redeemer Lutheran Church, he was buried in Lakeview Cemetery, Penticton. His obituary did not mention his role in the Easter Rising.

Hanna Sheehy-Skeffington was offered financial compensation by the British government in 1916, but she refused it because it came on the condition that she cease to speak and write about the murder. She became increasingly nationalist-minded, and supported the Anti-Treaty IRA during the Irish Civil War. She refused to send her son Owen to any school with a pro-Treaty ethos, and therefore opted to place him in the secular Sandford Park School when it was founded in 1922. Her sister's son Conor Cruise O'Brien was also placed there. Hanna died in 1946.

Owen Sheehy-Skeffington became a lecturer in French at Trinity College, and, beginning in 1954, an Irish Senator.

== See also ==
- List of peace activists

== Works ==
=== Books ===
- A Forgotten Aspect of the University Question. Privately printed, Dublin 1901 (published with The Day of the Rabblement by James Joyce.)
- Michael Davitt, revolutionary, agitator and labour leader, 1908 (accessible from Internet Archive).
- A Forgotten Small Nationality: Ireland and the War . New York City. 1917. pp. 3–16 – via Wikisource.
- In Dark and Evil Days, Dublin : J. Duffy, 1916.

=== Personal papers ===
The personal papers of Francis Sheehy Skeffington and his wife Hanna were donated to the National Library of Ireland. Details of the papers can be accessed online.
