= Gertrude Wilkinson =

British militant suffragette

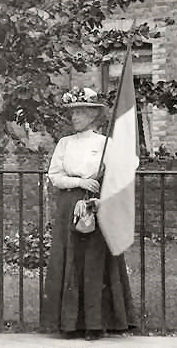
Gertrude Wilkinson campaigning in Whitstable in 1909

Gertrude Jessie Heward Wilkinson (1851 – 19 September 1929), also known as Jessie Howard, was a British militant Suffragette, who, as a member of the Women's Social and Political Union (WSPU), was imprisoned in Winson Green Prison. She went on hunger strike and was force-fed, for which she was awarded the WSPU's Hunger Strike Medal. In 1913, she became the Literature Secretary for the Women's Freedom League (WFL).

== Early life ==
Born as Gertrude Jessie Heward Bell in 1851 at Ickenham in Middlesex, the daughter of Jessie and Benjamin Bell, aged 18 she married solicitor William John Wilkinson (born 1844) on 14 June 1870 at St John's church in Hampstead. They had seven children: Eleanor Gertrude Wilkinson (1872–); William D. Wilkinson (1873–); John H. Wilkinson (1875–); Ethel Mary Wilkinson (1876–); Martin Blakeston Wilkinson (1877–1974); Geoffrey Andrew Wilkinson (1882–), and Leonard Garth Wilkinson (1883–1948).

== Militancy ==
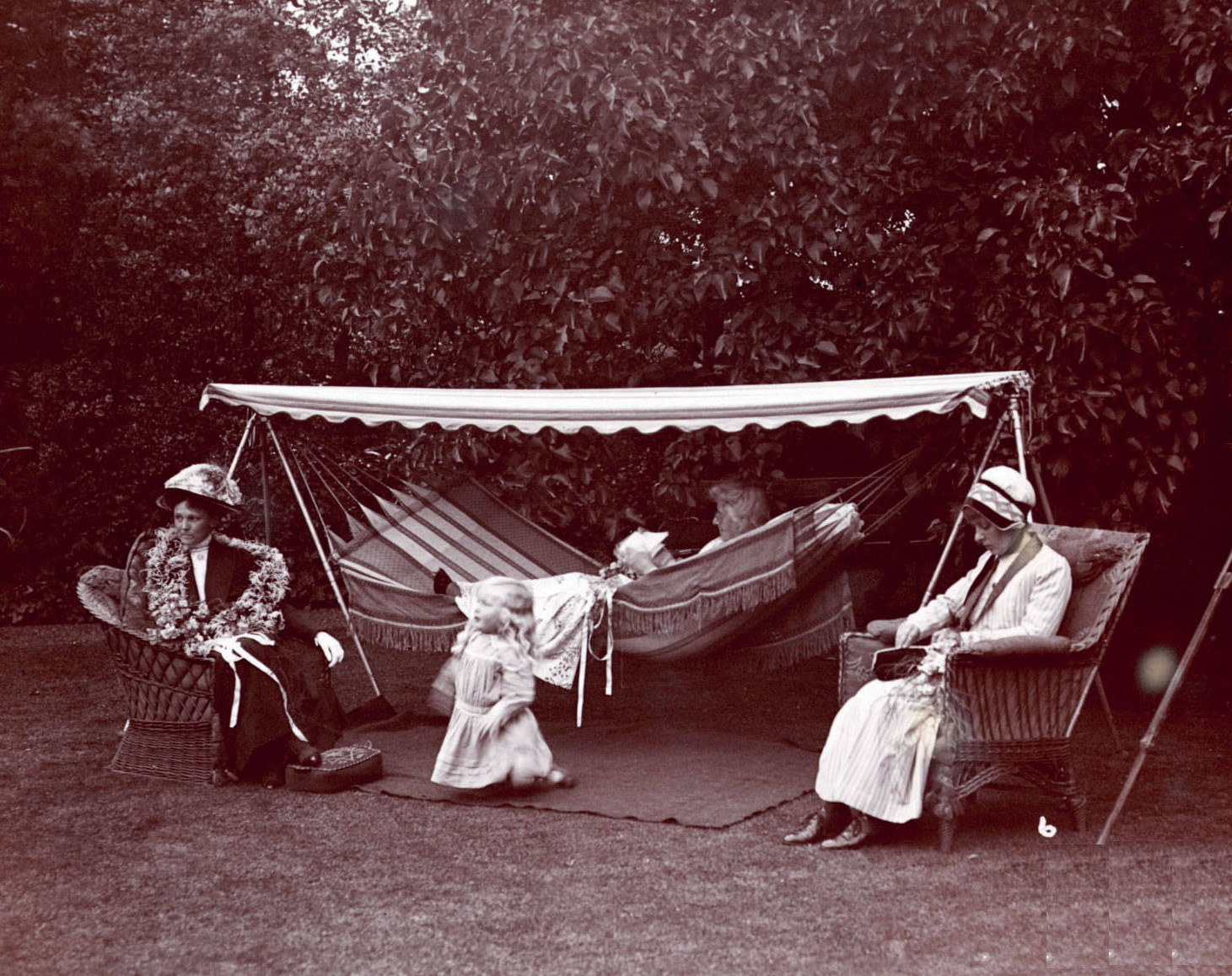
Hunger striking Suffragettes resting in the garden of Dorset Hall c.1912 L to R: Edith Marian Begbie, three year old Paul, the son of Rose Emma Lamartine Yates, Gertrude Wilkinson and Florence Macfarlane

During her militant career for women's suffrage she sometimes used the alias Jessie Howard. In 1909 she was photographed campaigning in Whitstable with Rose Emma Lamartine Yates and a Miss Barry. Yates had a holiday home nearby at Seasalter and Wilkinson would stay nearby. The two suffragettes were on holiday but still campaigning for women's suffrage. In 1912 she was imprisoned where she went on hunger strike and was force-fed for which she was awarded the WSPU's Hunger Strike Medal. To keep up morale in prison the women were forced to make their own entertainment. Some such as Emmeline Pethick-Lawrence told stories; later Emmeline Pankhurst reminisced about the early days of the WSPU. On 10 June 1912 the three imprisoned grandmothers - Gertrude Wilkinson, Janet Boyd and Mary Ann Aldham sang together. On another occasion some of the women performed a scene from The Merchant of Venice with Evaline Hilda Burkitt as Shylock and the role of Narissa played by Doreen Allen. A member of the Sheffield branch of the WSPU, in 1913 Wilkinson became the Literature Secretary for the Women's Freedom League (WFL).

In the group photograph of Suffragettes shown Edith Marian Begbie is on the left with Wilkinson in the centre and Florence Macfarlane on the right. The child kneeling in front of the hammock is three year old Paul Lamartine Yates, the son of Rose Emma Lamartine Yates, the Organising Secretary and Treasurer of the Wimbledon branch of the WSPU and at whose home, Dorset Hall in Merton Park the photograph was taken in about 1912.

Gertrude Wilkinson lived at 29 Oakley Square in Camden Town. She died in September 1929 at 6 Osnaburgh Terrace in Euston leaving £974 9s 10d in her will.
