= Florence Macfarlane =

Scottish hunger striking suffragette

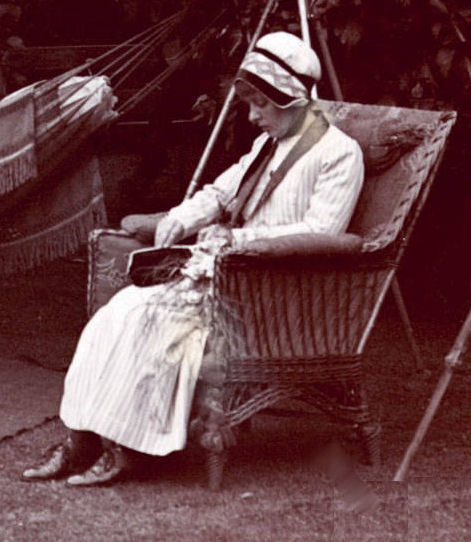
Florence Macfarlane in 1912

Florence Geraldine Macfarlane aka "Muriel Muir" (5 October 1867 – 28 October 1944) was a nurse, militant suffragette and member of the Women's Social and Political Union (WSPU) who went on hunger strike in Winson Green Prison in Birmingham in 1912 and who was awarded the WSPU's Hunger Strike Medal.She is sometimes known as "Madge Muir"

== Early life ==
She was born in 1867 in Leith in Midlothian in Scotland, one of at least twelve children born to Marian Elizabeth née Newton (1841–1883) and John Macfarlane (1837–1903). The couple's second daughter, Florence Macfarlane sometimes used the pseudonym Muriel Muir to take an active role in the suffrage movement. Her older sister was fellow-Suffragette Edith Marian Begbie (1866–1932). In 1856 John Macfarlane joined the family business making wire cloth products and which also moved into paper milling. The 1881 census shows that by that year the family had moved to Edinburgh. As his businesses became more profitable John Macfarlane founded a liberal newspaper and his liberal principles may have influenced his daughters in their later actions. By 1901 Florence was a Hospital Matron running a private hospital for women at 2 Archibald Place in Edinburgh with two of her younger sisters.

== Militancy ==
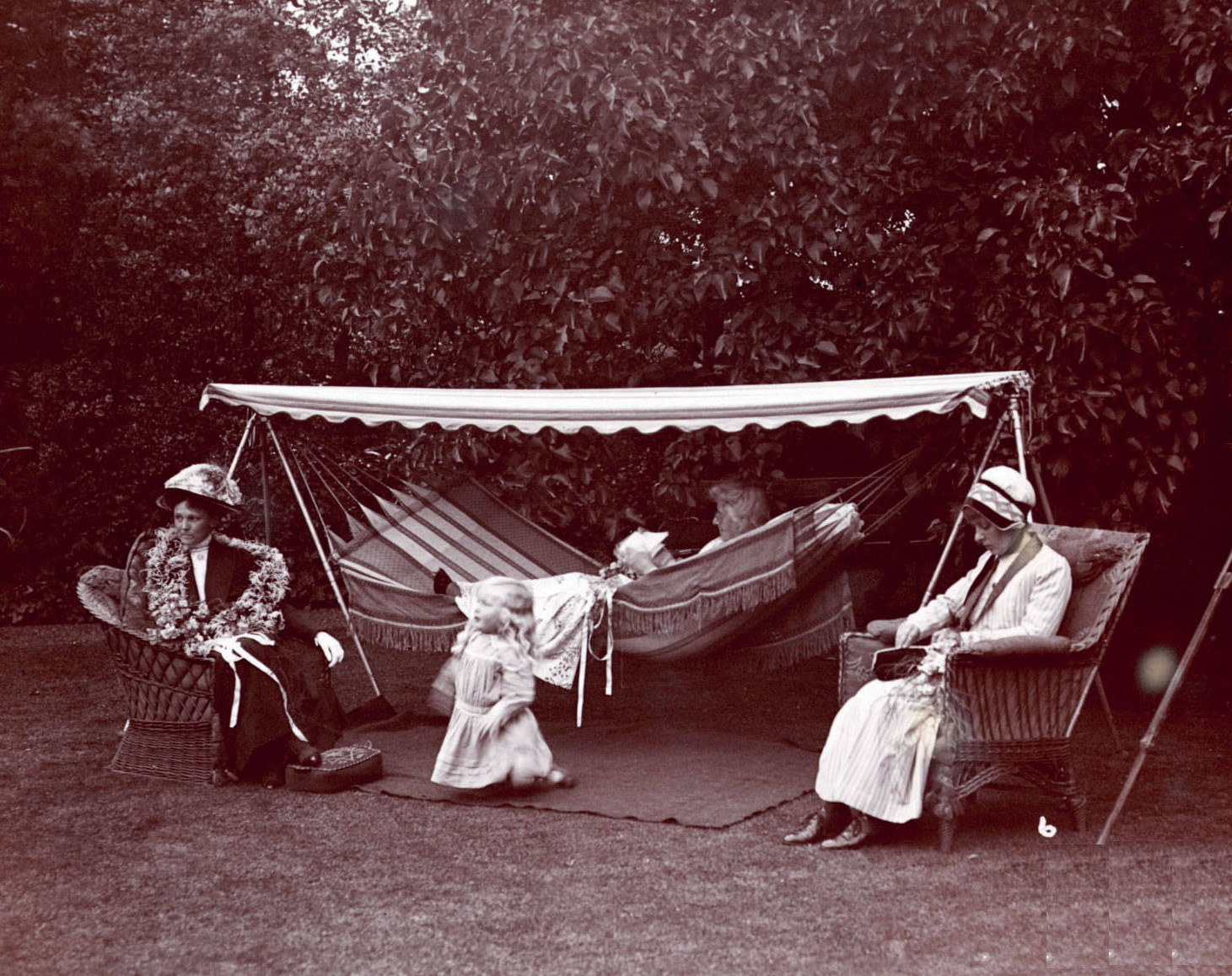
Hunger striking Suffragettes resting in the garden of Dorset Hall c.1912 L to R: Edith Marian Begbie, three-year old Paul, the son of Rose Emma Lamartine Yates, Gertrude Wilkinson and Florence Macfarlane

Macfarlane was among the staff of the Women's Social and Political Union's branch in Belfast. With her sister she was arrested while taking part in Black Friday on 18 November 1910 and appeared in court at Bow Street Magistrates' Court the next day when charges against her were dropped. She again appeared in court in March 1912 for breaking a window in the High Street in Kensington when she was remanded in custody and sent for trial. She gave her address then as 61 Nethergate, Dundee. Known as "Dundee’s hunger-striker", during her imprisonment in Winson Green Prison in Birmingham Macfarlane went on hunger strike along with Gertrude Wilkinson and her sister Edith Begbie. On their release from prison both sisters were unwell and appeared very frail; Florence continued with her militant campaign for women's suffrage on her release but Edith Begbie was not arrested again.

In the group photograph shown Begbie is on the left with Wilkinson in the centre and Macfarlane on the right. The child kneeling in front of the hammock is three-year old Paul Lamartine Yates, the son of Rose Emma Lamartine Yates, the Organising Secretary and Treasurer of the Wimbledon branch of the WSPU and at whose home, Dorset Hall in Merton Park the photograph was taken in about 1912.

== Later years ==
In 1915 Macfarlane left the United Kingdom for the United States being listed in the ship's register as a mental healer and arriving in New York on 24 May 1915. In America she also worked as a magazine journalist. She became the Honorary Secretary of the Six Point Group, a British feminist campaign group founded by Lady Rhondda and others in 1921 to press for changes in the law of the United Kingdom in six key areas concerning the inequality between men and women and the rights of the child. On 16 January 1923 she returned to London from Beira and was living at 26 Frognal Lane in Hampstead.

An article in The Vote published on 23 June 1933 reproduced a letter to The Times that Macfarlane had co-signed as Honorary Secretary of the Six Point Group. The archive of the University of Liverpool holds a large amount of correspondence from the Six Point Group from 1933 where they are involved in the case of female staff losing their jobs on getting married. In one letter Macfarlane invites a Dr Miller to a forthcoming Suffragette Dinner and in which she suggests a meeting with Charlotte Marsh. In 1934 she was the Honorary International Secretary of the Six Point Group at the Maison Internationale in Geneva. Then she was living at 31 Brookfield, West Hill, N6.

Florence Geraldine Macfarlane returned to Los Angeles in California in 1939 at which time her medical record described her as suffering "extreme restlessness and nervousness". She died in Los Angeles in October 1944.
