= Royal Academy Exhibition of 1914 =

1914 art exhibition in London

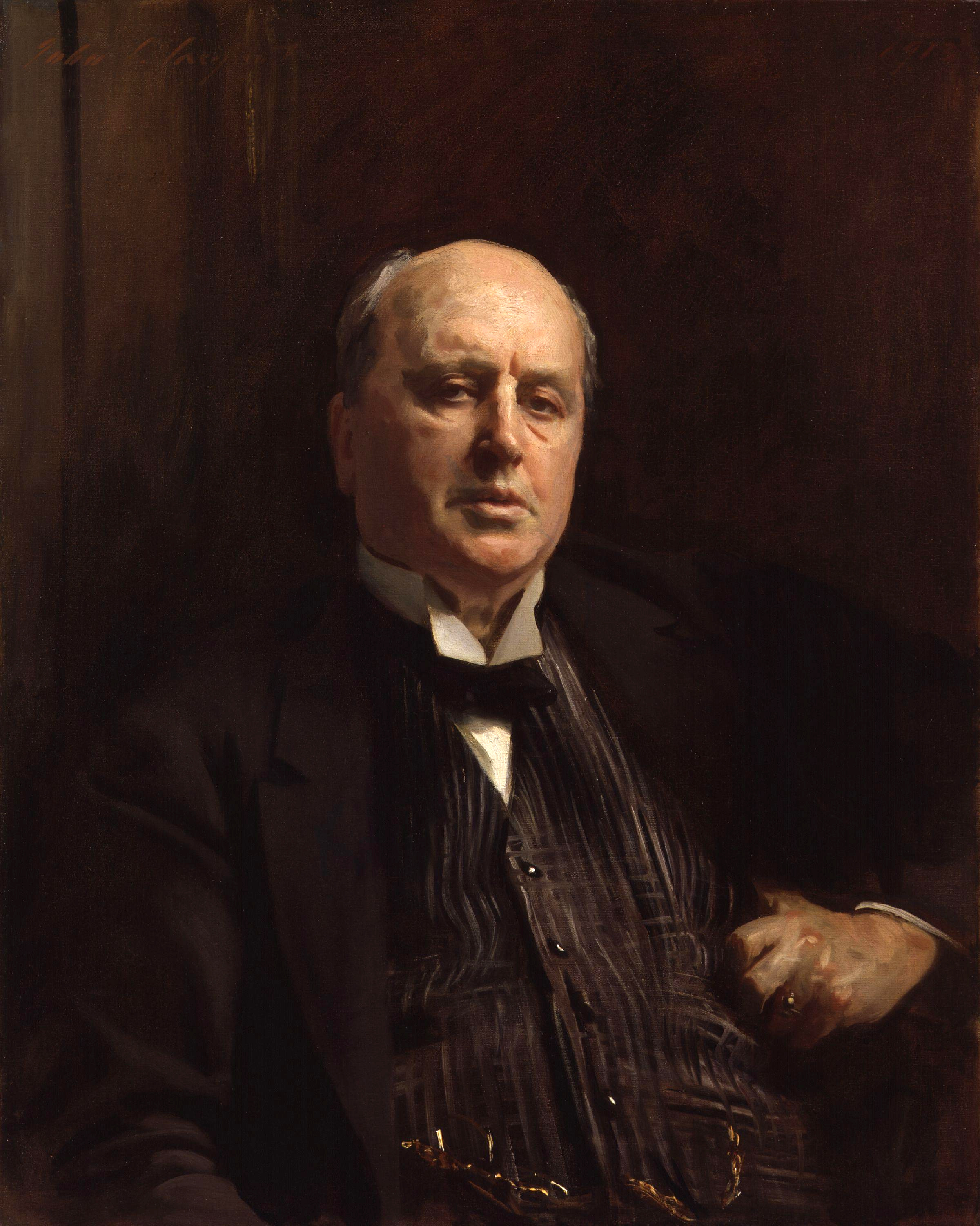
Portrait of Henry James by John Singer Sargent

The Royal Academy Exhibition of 1914 was an art exhibition held in London. Organised by the British Royal Academy of Arts it took place at Burlington House in Piccadilly between 4 May and 15 August 1914. It was the last to be opened before the outbreak of the First World War, which British entered on 4 August 1914.

One of the most notable works on display was John Singer Sargent's Portrait of Henry James depicting his fellow Anglo-American Henry James. However it received notoriety when it was attacked by the suffragette Mary Wood. She slashed it three times with a meat cleaver. George Clausen's nude Primavera was also attacked by suffragettes. This was part of a wave of political vandalism by the suffragettes that summer.

Violets for Perfume by Henry Herbert La Thangue

The British Impressionist Henry Herbert La Thangue displayed Violets for Perfume, a genre painting set in Provence, which he submitted as his diploma work to the Royal Academy on being elected to full membership the previous year. Lady Feodora Gleichen displayed a nude statuette Woman of 1914 which attracted a degree of controversy, and has to be roped off to protect it from crowding.

The architect Edwin Lutyens outlined his planned designs for New Delhi the capital of British India.

== Bibliography ==
- Garrett, Miranda & Thomas, Zoë. Suffrage and the Arts: Visual Culture, Politics and Enterprise. Bloomsbury Academic, 2019.
