= Janet Boyd =

British suffragette (1850–1928)

Janet Augusta Boyd (née Haig; 1850 – 22 September 1928) was a British suffragette and member of the Women's Social and Political Union (WSPU). In 1912 she went on hunger strike in prison for which she was awarded the WSPU's Hunger Strike Medal.

== Family ==
She was born, as Janet Augusta Haig, into an upper middle class family in Marylebone in Middlesex in 1850. Her father was George Augustus Haig (1820–1906), a merchant and landowner from Pen Ithon, Radnorshire, Wales, who was of Scottish descent and was a cousin of Douglas Haig. Her mother was Anne Eliza Haig (née Fell) (1822–1894).

Her sisters, who also were suffragettes, were Charlotte Haig and Sybil Haig (later Viscountess Rhondda), through the latter of whom her niece was the suffragette Margaret Thomas, who became the second Viscountess Rhondda.

=== Marriage and issue ===
In 1874, she married the armigerous solicitor George Fenwick Boyd (1849–1909), of University College, Oxford, who was later High Sheriff of Durham, and whose industrialist father Edward Fenwick Boyd had built Moor House in the village of Leamside outside Durham.

With him, Haig had four daughters: Sybil Mary Boyd (1875–1954); Annie Boyd (1878–1966); Hester Boyd (1879–1971), and Janet Haig Boyd (1883–1956). When George Boyd inherited his father's house he and Janet and their four daughters took up residence there. The death of George Boyd in 1909 allowed his widow the freedom to join the fight for women's suffrage

== Activism ==
The Sunderland Daily Echo and Shipping Gazette of 12 June 1911 recorded that Janet Boyd had refused to pay her rates of £21 and to raise the money she held an auction at her home during which a member of the WSPU came to speak to the assembled crowd and which resulted in Boyd selling a Spanish mantilla which was bought by her gardener; the money to pay for this probably came from Boyd herself. In the same year Boyd joined the protest against the 1911 census return in which she is not named. Underneath is written, "14 females passed the night here. As women are not counted as voters, neither should they be counted on this census."

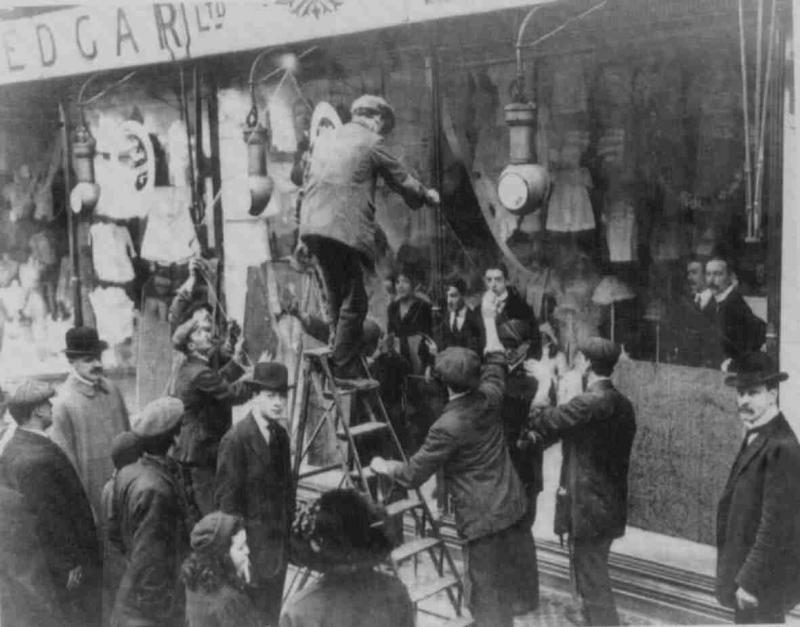
suffragette window smashing campaign

In November 1911, after the failure of the Conciliation Bill, anger spilled over into direct action and 223 suffragettes were arrested during a campaign of window smashing. Among the arrests were seven women with Welsh connections, including Edith Mansell Moullin, Mildred Mansel (sister of Ivor Guest, MP), and Boyd, who was arrested on 19 November 1911 for breaking a window in The Strand in London. During her appearance at Bow Street Magistrates' Court on 22 November, Haig stated "I don't consider I was guilty, because I was doing it for a good purpose." She was fined 10 shillings and three shillings for the damage and sentenced to seven days in prison.

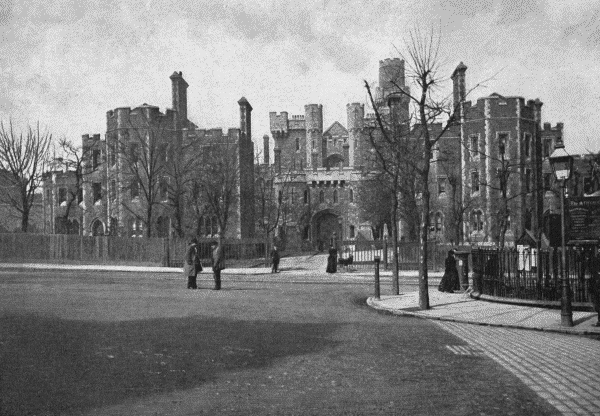
In 1912 Boyd was sentenced to 6 months in Holloway Prison – seen here c. 1896

Boyd's second arrest was in March 1912. At her first hearing on 2 March 1912 she was committed for trial together with her cousin Florence Haig for breaking two windows each at D H Evans on Oxford Street valued at £66. Haig stated that if she was bound over to keep the peace she would feel like a soldier deserting in the middle of battle. At her subsequent trial at the London Sessions, on 19 March 1912, Boyd was sentenced to six months in Holloway Prison where she went on hunger strike but was not force-fed; she was released at the end of June 1912. She was awarded the Hunger Strike Medal by the leadership of the WSPU. To keep up morale in prison the women were forced to make their own entertainment. Some such as Emmeline Pethick-Lawrence told stories; later Emmeline Pankhurst reminisced about the early days of the WSPU. On 10 June 1912 the three imprisoned grandmothers – Boyd, Gertrude Wilkinson, and Mary Ann Aldham sang together. On another occasion some of the women performed a scene from The Merchant of Venice with Evaline Hilda Burkitt as Shylock and the role of Narissa played by Doreen Allen. Boyd was one of 68 women, among them Emily Davison, who added their signatures or initials to The Suffragette Handkerchief embroidered by prisoners in Holloway in March 1912, and kept until 1950 by Mary Ann Hilliard, and still available to view at the Priest House West Hoathly. Boyd was one of two grandmothers to sign the handkerchief.

The Durham Advertiser for 30 May 1913 reported on "Mrs Boyd's annual "votes for women" protest... The protest takes the form of the refusal to pay Government taxes demanded and the consequent execution of a distress warrant upon Mrs Boyd's goods." Another auction was held at Boyd's home attended by her friends and supporters as well as the tax collector. On this occasion 'One article, an Italian necklace, was put up for auction, and this was knocked down to Mrs Atkinson for the sum of £26, an amount sufficient to meet the demand and expenses'. Presumably, this item too made its way back into Boyd's possession.

== Later years ==
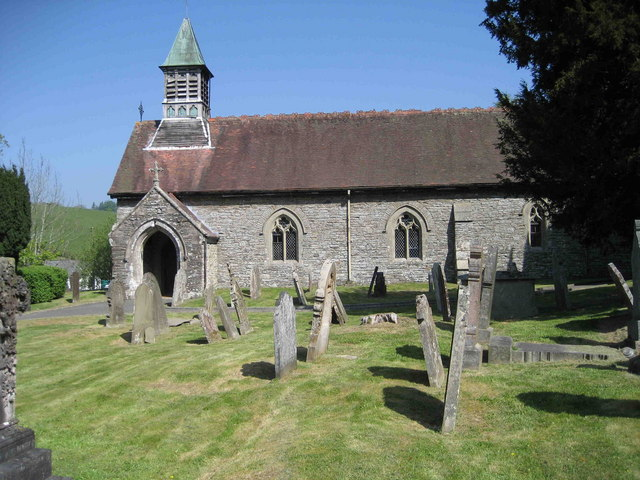
Boyd is buried in the churchyard of St. Padarn's church in Llanbadarn Fynydd in Powys, Wales

Janet Boyd spent her later years at the family home of Moor House in Leamside near Durham. She died on 22 September 1928 in Prescott House at Gotherington near Cheltenham and is included in the Suffragette Roll of Honour. She is buried in St. Padarn's Churchyard, Llanbadarn Fynydd in Llandrindod Wells in Powys, Wales.
