= Edith Marian Begbie =

Scottish hunger striking suffragette (1866–1932)

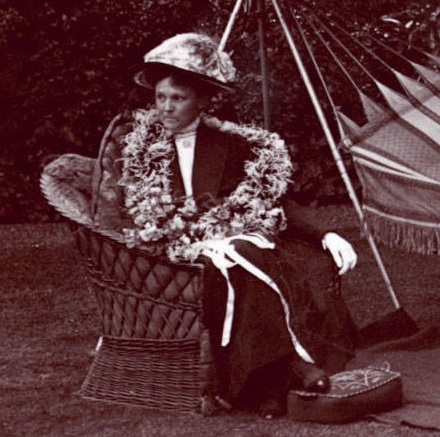
Edith Marian Begbie in about 1912

Edith Marian Begbie (8 February 1866 – 27 March 1932) was a Scottish suffragette and member of the Women's Social and Political Union (WSPU) who went on hunger strike in Winson Green Prison in Birmingham in 1912 and who was awarded the WSPU's Hunger Strike Medal.

== Early life ==
She was born in 1866 as Edith Marian Macfarlane in Leith in Midlothian in Scotland, the oldest daughter of at least twelve children born to Marian Elizabeth née Newton (1841–1883) and John Macfarlane (1837–1903). The couple's second daughter, Florence Geraldine Macfarlane (1867–1944) who sometimes using the pseudonym Muriel Muir was also to take an active role in the suffrage movement. In 1856 John Macfarlane joined the family business making wire cloth products and which also moved into paper milling. The 1881 census shows that by that year the family had moved to Edinburgh. As his businesses became more profitable John Macfarlane founded a liberal newspaper and his liberal principles may have influenced his daughters in their later actions. By 1901 Florence was running a hospital for women in Edinburgh with two of her younger sisters. In 1888 Edith Marian Macfarlane married John Aitchison Begbie (1859–1907), an East India merchant, following which the couple moved to Stanmore in Middlesex where they had four children: George Begbie (1889–); Thomas Newton Begbie (1891–1919); William Herbert Begbie (1893–1959), and Hilda Aitchison Begbie (1897–1936).

== Militancy ==
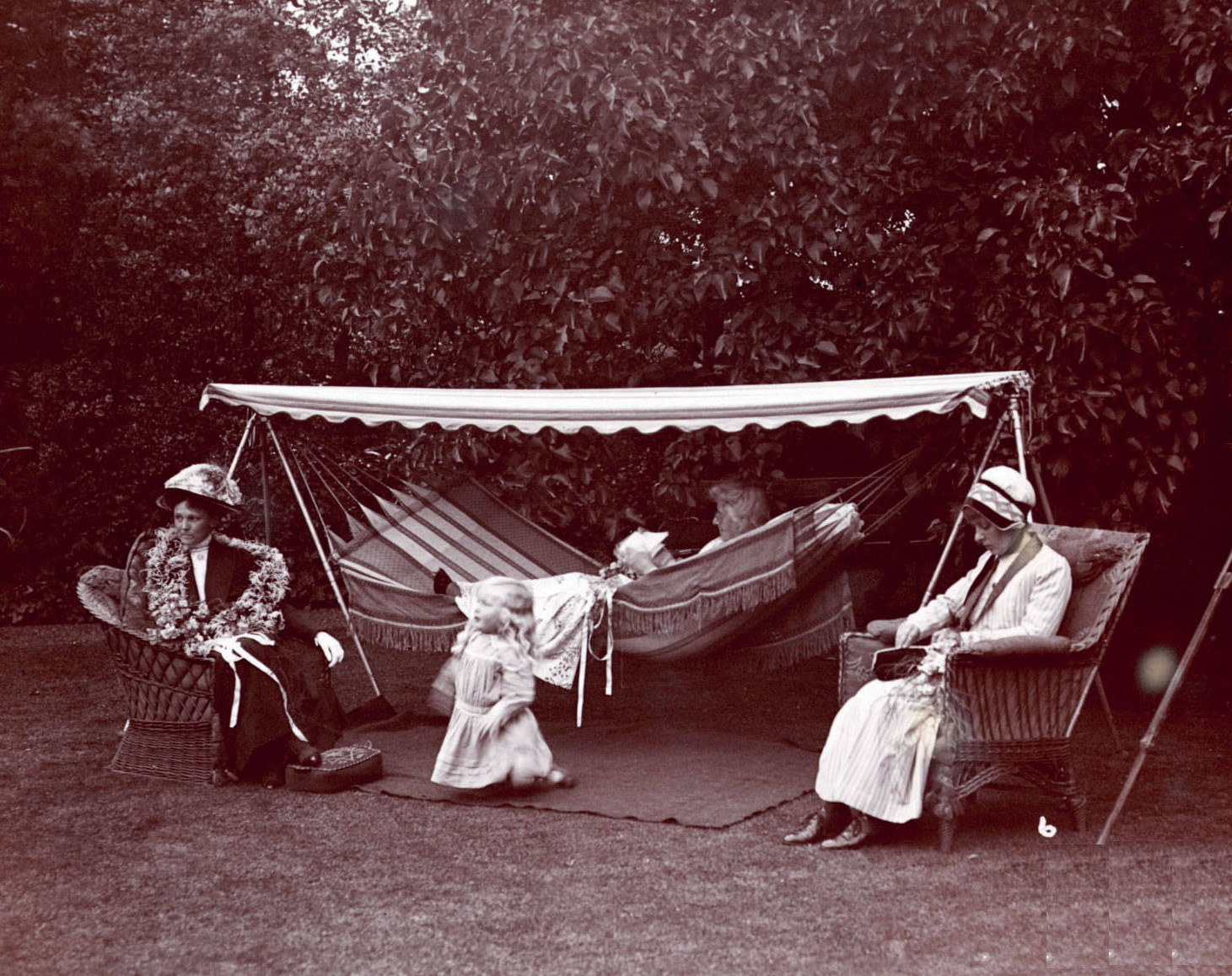
Hunger striking Suffragettes resting in the garden of Dorset Hall c.1912 L to R: Edith Marian Begbie, three-year old Paul, the son of Rose Emma Lamartine Yates, Gertrude Wilkinson and Florence Macfarlane

The now widowed Begbie was first arrested on Black Friday in 1910 but the charges against her were subsequently dropped. In 1911 she participated in the "No Vote no Census" protest and although she gave her name for the 1911 Census she refused to disclose any further information. Arrested again on 7 March 1912 she was charged with smashing windows at various premises along The Strand in London with something she had hidden in her muff. She was arrested and remanded in custody for committal. At her trial a witness described how Begbie walked down The Strand smashing one window after another causing about £40 in damage. During her first appearance in court Begbie declared "I stand here as the mother of four children ... that my children should have equal rights and protection, daughters and sons, and as I cannot appeal to men’s reason I must use their own language, which is violence." During her imprisonment in Winson Green Prison in Birmingham Begbie went on hunger strike along with Gertrude Wilkinson and her sister Florence Macfarlane, known as "Dundee’s hunger-striker" and who arrived in prison a few days after the former two. On their release from prison both sisters were unwell and appeared very frail; Florence continued with her militant campaign for women's suffrage but Edith Begbie was not arrested again.

In the group photograph shown Begbie is on the left with Wilkinson in the centre and Macfarlane on the right. The child kneeling in front of the hammock is three-year old Paul Lamartine Yates, the son of Rose Emma Lamartine Yates, the Organising Secretary and Treasurer of the Wimbledon branch of the WSPU and at whose home, Dorset Hall in Merton Park the photograph was taken in about 1912. Begbie was the second-in-command of the WSPU branch at Wimbledon.

Edith Marian Begbie lived at 107 The Ridgeway in Wimbledon. On her death in 1932 she left £3,045 9s 7d.
