= Doreen Allen =

English militant suffragette (1879–1963)

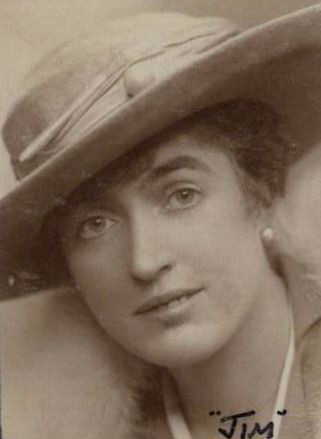
- Allen in 1905
- Born: Edith Doreen Allchin; 1879; Dartford, Kent, England
- Died: 18 June 1963 (aged 83–84); Brighton, Sussex, England
- Organization: Women's Social and Political Union

Edith Doreen Allen (née Allchin, 1879 – 18 June 1963) was an English suffragette and member of the Women's Social and Political Union (WSPU), who on being imprisoned was force-fed, for which she received the WSPU's Hunger Strike Medal 'For Valour'.

== Life ==
Allen was born in Dartford, Kent, England as Edith Doreen Allchin, one of ten children of Mary Ann née Amos (1838–1924) and John James Allchin (1836–1903), a builder. In 1905 she married Melville Hodsoll Allen (1879–1932) who worked at the Stock Exchange in London and who served in World War I as a captain in the Queen's Own Royal West Kent Regiment.

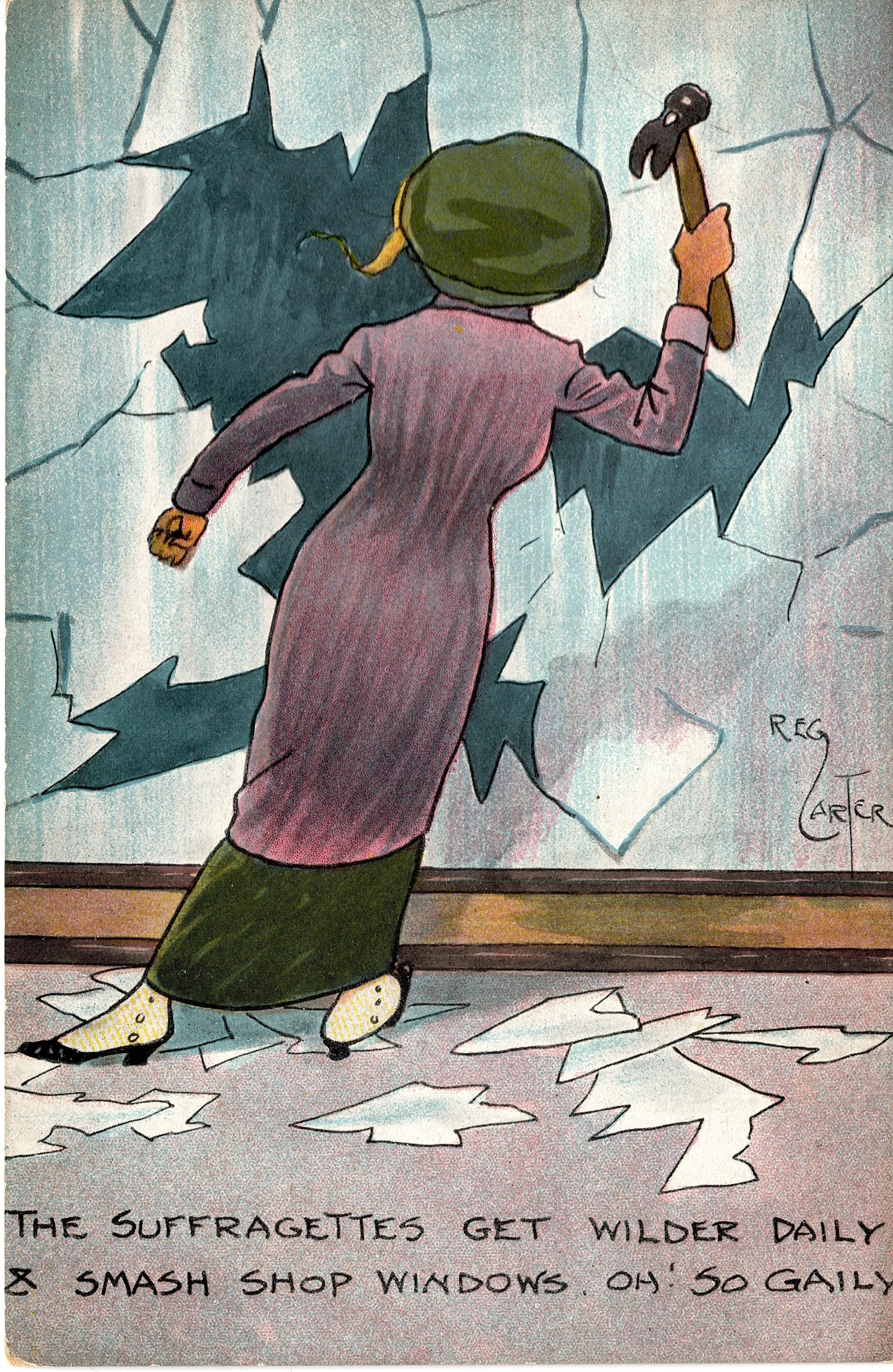
Cartoon of a woman in suffragette colours smashing windows.

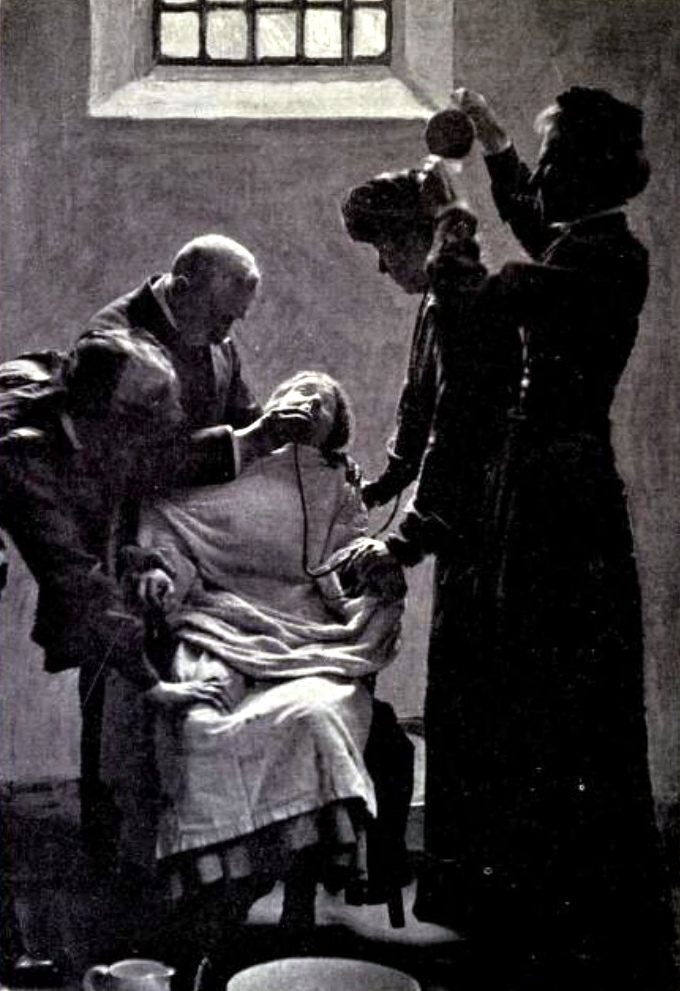
Force feeding suffragettes on hunger strike

Following Allen's arrest in March 1912 for taking part in a window smashing campaign she appeared at Bow Street Magistrates' Court on 12 March 1912, before being sent for trial at the London Sessions on 19 March 1912. She was sentenced to four months imprisonment in Holloway Prison for "causing willful damage." She went on hunger strike in prsion and was force-fed.

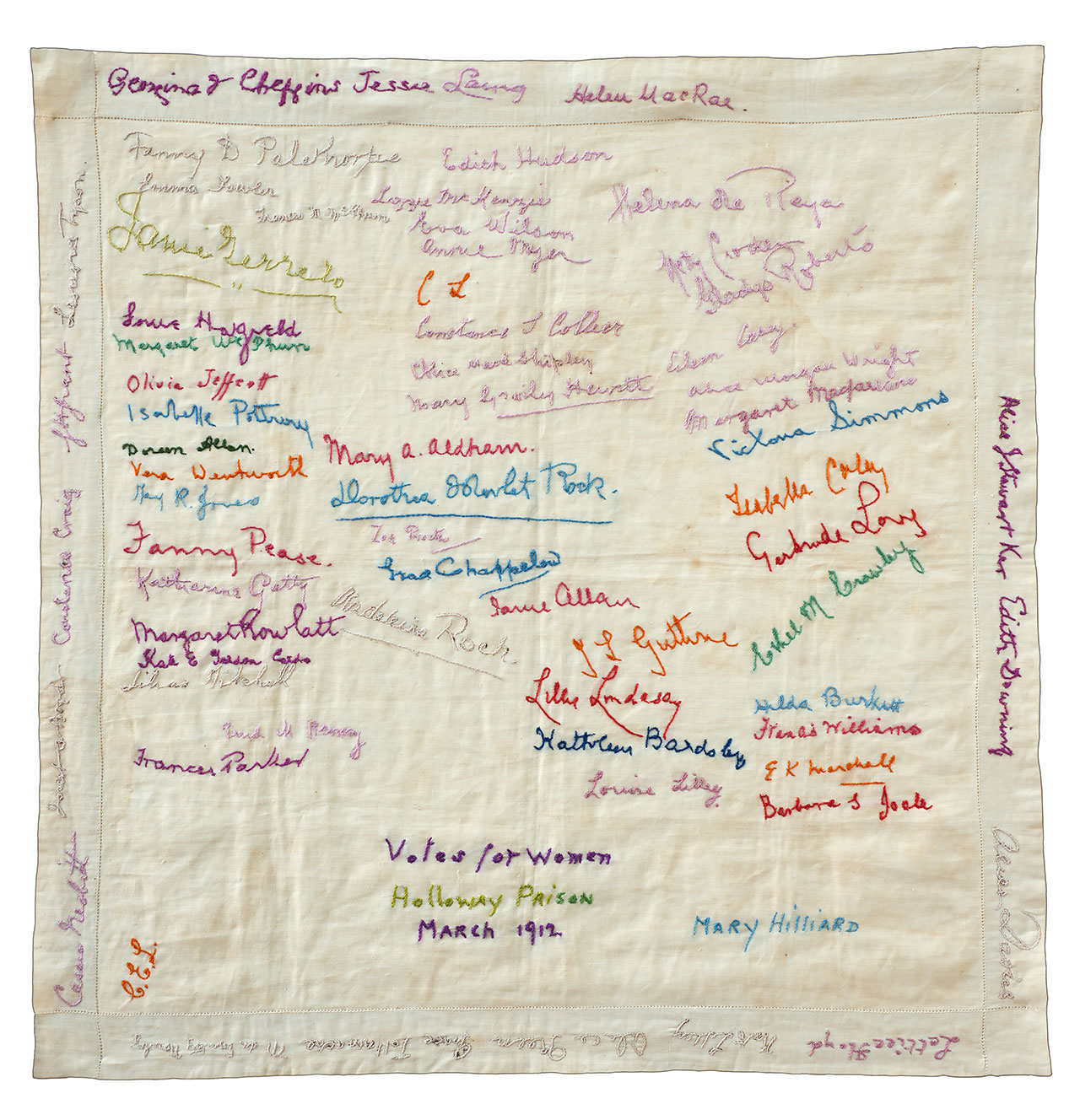
The Suffragette Handerkerchief

A fellow-prisoner in Holloway was Mary Ann Aldham and the signatures of the two appear on The Suffragette Handkerchief embroidered by Janie Terrero. To keep up morale in prison, the women were forced to make their own entertainment. Some such as Emmeline Pethick-Lawrence told stories while Doreen Allen sat at her feet with an arm on her knee; later Emmeline Pankhurst reminisced about the early days of the WSPU. On 10 June 1912 the three imprisoned grandmothers – Gertrude Wilkinson (aka Jessie Howard), Janet Boyd and Mary Ann Aldham sang together. On another occasion some of the women performed a scene from The Merchant of Venice with Evaline Hilda Burkitt as Shylock and the role of Narissa played by Allen. On her release Allen resumed her political activities on behalf of women's suffrage.

When WSPU leader Emmeline Pankhurst returned to Great Britain from America in late 1913, she was met at Plymouth by a group suffragettes which included Allen. As Pankhurst disembarked from the Majestic she was arrested under the Cat and Mouse Act and taken to Exeter Prison.

in her later years Doreen Allen lived in Brighton in Sussex. She died in June 1963.

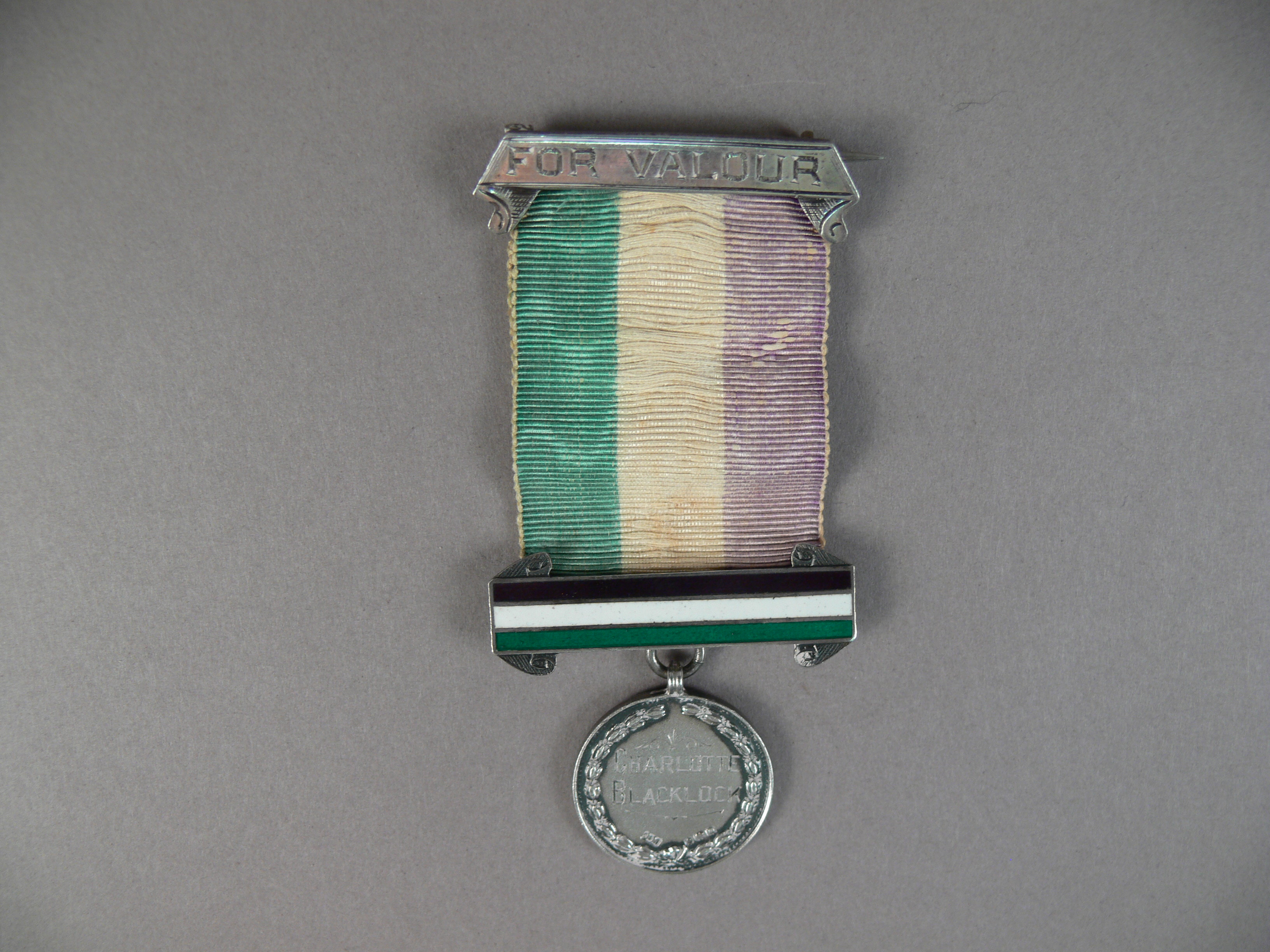
Example of WSPU Hunger Strike medal

Allen's nephew was Sir Geoffrey Cuthbert Allchin KCBE, CMG, MC (1895–1968), British Ambassador in Morocco.

== See also ==
- Women's suffrage in the United Kingdom
- Hunger Strike Medal
- The Suffragette Handkerchief
