= Mary Ann Aldham =

English suffragette (1858–1940)

- Mary Ann Aldham in a Home Office surveillance photograph (c. 1914)
- Born: Mary Ann Mitchell Wood; 28 September 1858; Deptford, Kent, England
- Died: 1940 (aged 81–82); Uxbridge, Middlesex, England
- Organization: Women's Social and Political Union

Mary Ann Aldham (born Mary Ann Mitchell Wood; 28 September 1858 – 1940) was an English suffragette and member of the Women's Social and Political Union (WSPU) who was imprisoned at least seven times. She went on hunger strike in prison where she was force-fed for which she received the WSPU's Hunger Strike Medal.

== Early life ==
She was born in Deptford in Kent in 1858 as Mary Ann Mitchell Wood, the daughter of Mary Ann and Alfred Robert Wood, a Captain; her mother died less than two months after her birth. On 10 October 1883, Mary Ann Wood married Arthur Robert Aldham (1853–1905), a commercial clerk with the P&O Shipping Line and with him had two daughters: Mary Aldham (1885–1955) and Gertrude Aldham (1887–1909). Arthur Aldham died in 1905.

== Activism ==
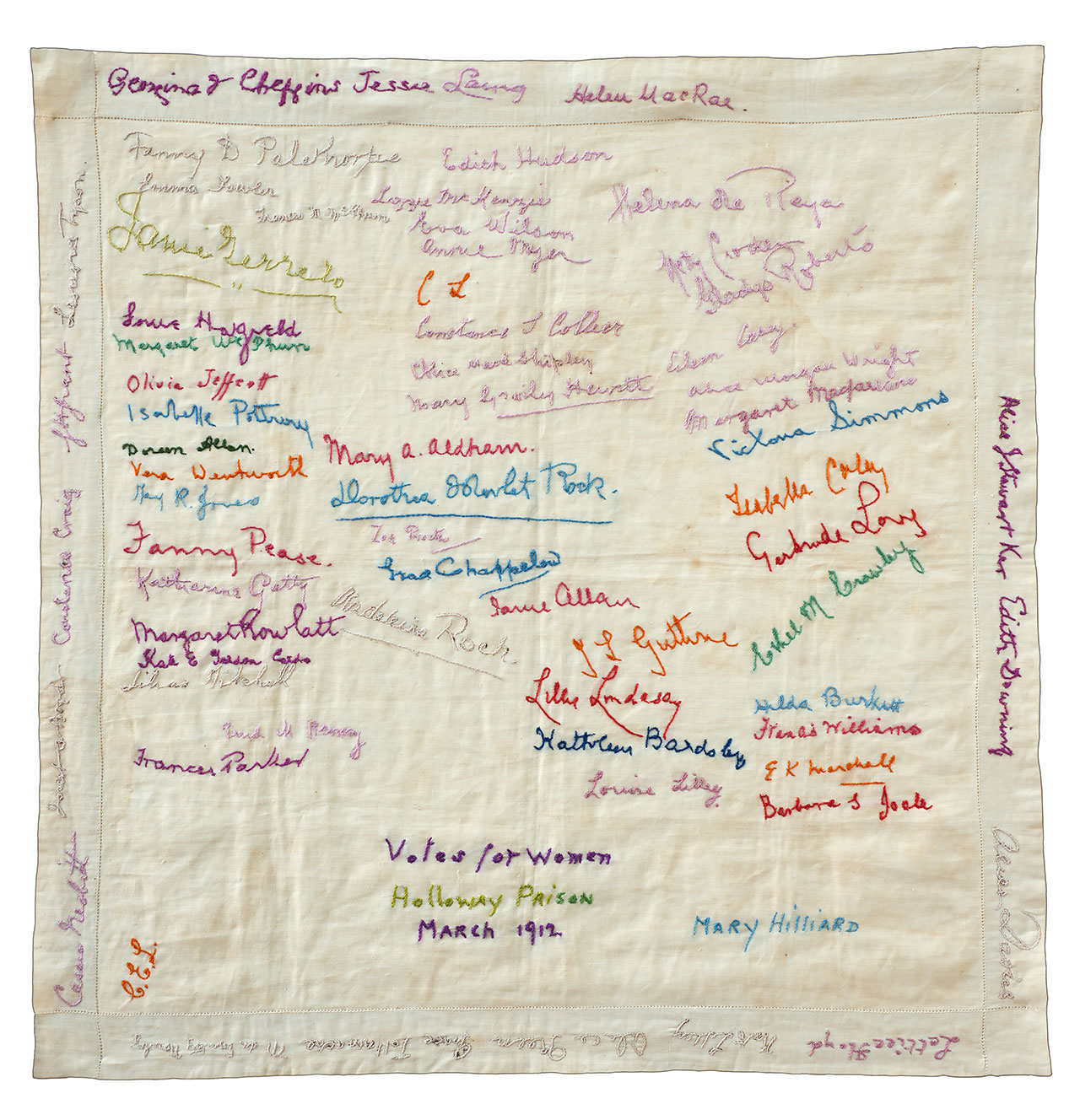
Mary Ann Aldham signed the Suffragette Handkerchief, HM Prison Holloway 1912

After joining the Women's Social and Political Union in about 1908, Aldham was arrested at least seven times: on 14 October 1908 and 19 November 1908 (as Mary Ann Mitchell Oldham); 22 November 1911; 7 March 1912; 19 March 1912; 17 November 1913 and 4 May 1914. Aldham often used her maiden name of Wood or the assumed name Oldham (presumably because of its similarity to her real surname 'Aldham') when she was arrested. She was among 223 women arrested in November 1911 for window breaking and was the first defendant to appear at the subsequent trial which was attended by Christabel Pankhurst and Sylvia Pankhurst. Aldham refused to pay her fine for which she was sentenced to one month's imprisonment in Holloway Prison. Following her two arrests in March 1912 she was sentenced to six months in Holloway Prison during which she went on hunger strike but was not force-fed; she was released early from prison at the end of June 1912.

To keep up morale in prison the women were forced to make their own entertainment. Some such as Emmeline Pethick-Lawrence told stories; later Emmeline Pankhurst reminisced about the early days of the WSPU. On 10 June 1912 the three imprisoned grandmothers, Gertrude Wilkinson (aka Jessie Howard), Janet Boyd and Aldham, sang together. On another occasion women performed a scene from The Merchant of Venice with Evaline Hilda Burkitt as Shylock and the role of Nerissa played by Doreen Allen. During her time in Holloway she and her fellow inmates signed The Suffragette Handkerchief which was subsequently embroidered by Janie Terrero. Aldham was one of two grandmothers whose names appear on the handkerchief.

In November 1913 the 55-year-old Aldham was among a group of four suffragettes who protested at the Old Bailey during the trial of Jane Short (aka Rachel Peace) who had been force-fed while on remand awaiting trial. On being charged with breaking glass in a screen in the Court Aldham said "I did it." For this action she sentenced to a month in prison with hard labour. Aldham was to be released under the Prisoners (Temporary Discharge for Ill Health) Act 1913, also known as the Cat and Mouse Act; this released dangerously ill hunger striking prisoners until they had regained their health and could be imprisoned again to serve out the rest of their sentence.

== Attack at the Royal Academy ==
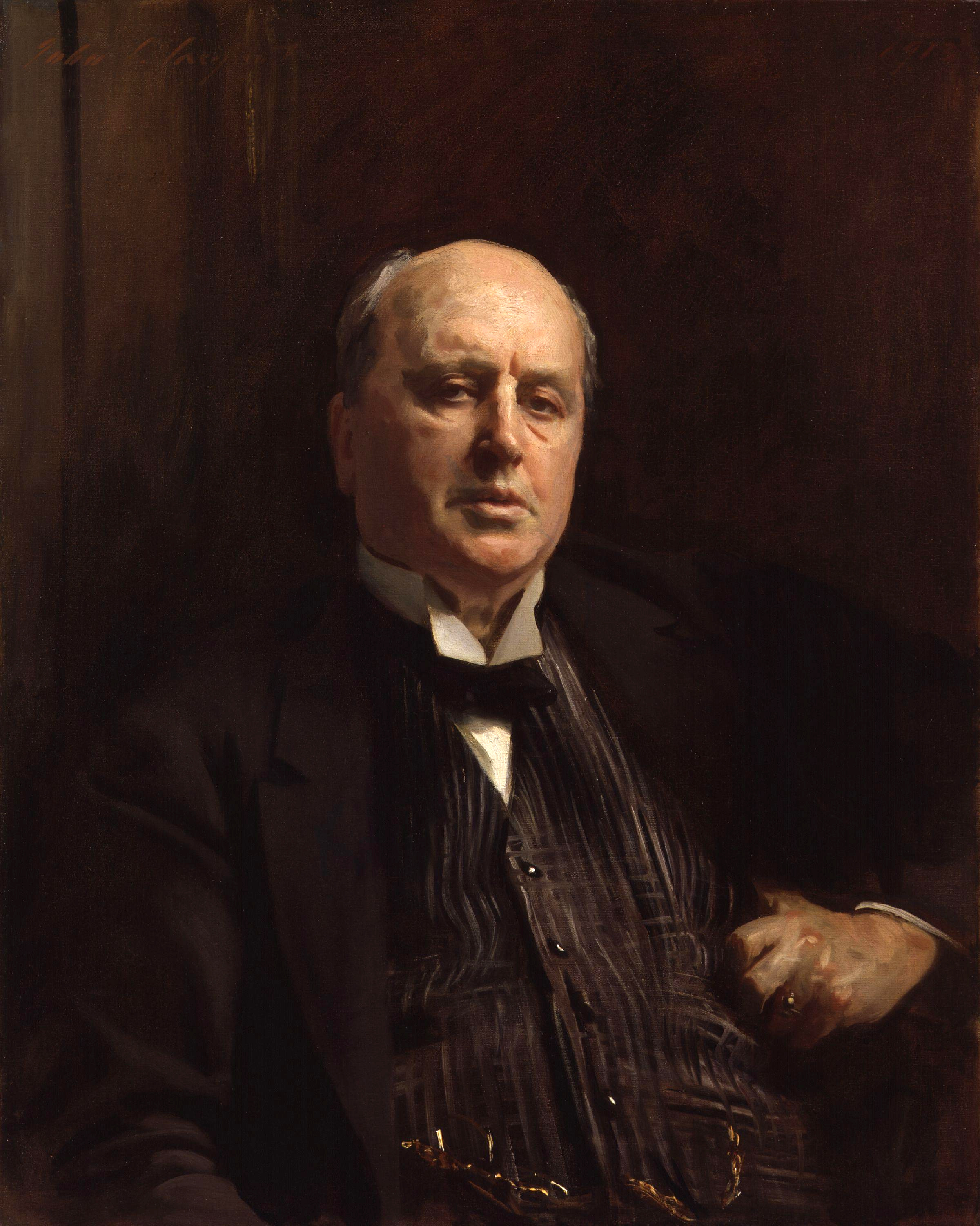
Portrait of Henry James. This portrait of Henry James by John Singer Sargent was slashed by Aldham at the Royal Academy Exhibition in 1914

When the Summer Exhibition opened at the Royal Academy on 4 May 1914, Aldham attended among the great crowds and attacked the portrait of Henry James by John Singer Sargent by breaking the glass and slashing the canvas three times with a meat cleaver while crying "Votes for Women". The Daily Telegraph reported that "About half-past one, when the attendance was thinning for lunch, the crash of glass was heard, and an elderly white-haired woman was seen to be hacking at the Sargent portrait with a butcher's cleaver." A writer for The Daily Sketch recorded that a visitor "pressed through the crowd, and aimed a blow at her. A man who put his arm in front of her to protect her was mobbed, and his glasses were knocked off and smashed". This man, according to The Daily Telegraph, was immediately regarded by the crowd as a suffragette supporter and "was seized, amid cheers and groans, and his silk hat was sent flying". A report in The Daily Graphic added that "the Woman with the Butcher's Chopper had startled a fashionable Royal Academy crowd out of its decorum."

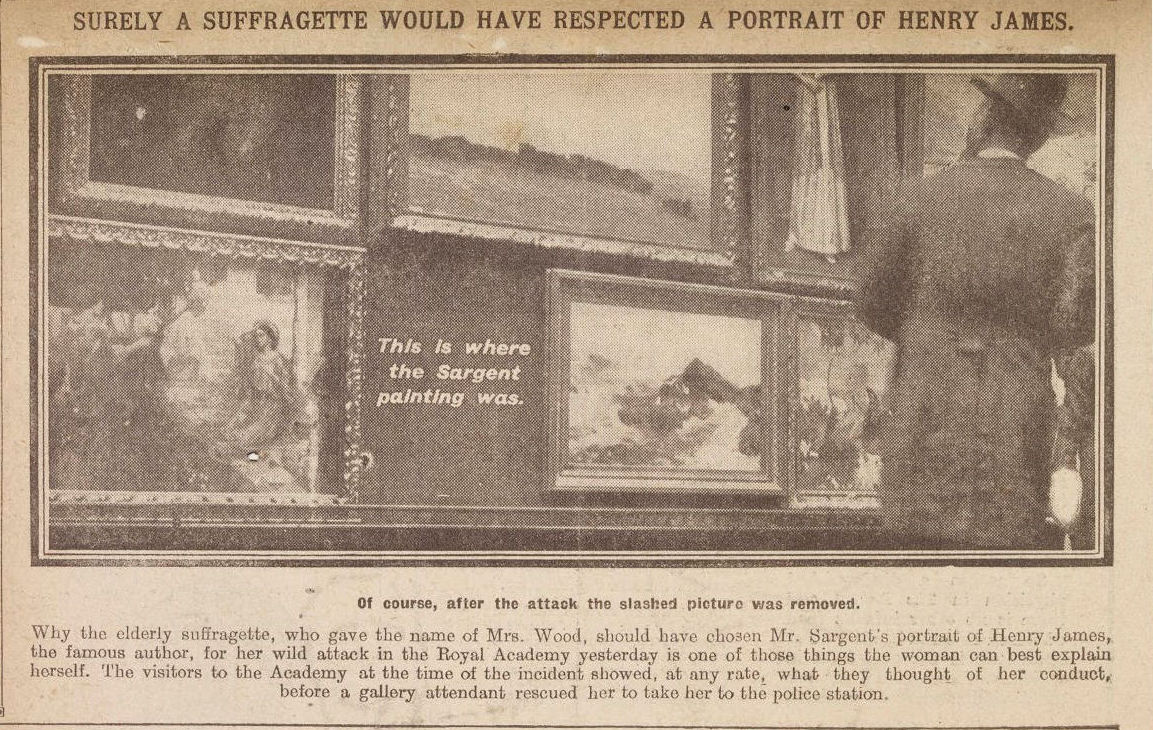
A newspaper cutting from 1914 concerning Aldham's attack at the Royal Academy

Aldham wrote to the Women's Social and Political Union stating "I have tried to destroy a valuable picture because I wish to show the public that they have no security for their property nor for their art treasures until women are given the political freedom". The portrait was valued at £700 and Sir Walter Lamb, the Secretary of the Royal Academy calculated that the portrait's value had been reduced by between £100 and £300 as a result of the attack. To this Aldham responded, "I quite understand; if a woman had painted it, it would not have been worth so much."

Aldham's attack was a response to the arrest of Emmeline Pankhurst. On again being imprisoned in Holloway Prison awaiting trial, Aldham was again released under the 'Cat and Mouse Act' and sent for treatment in a nursing home. She was released to the care of her now married daughter, Mary Aldham. Her militant actions on behalf of the WSPU ended with the start of World War I later in 1914.

== Later years ==
Mary Ann Aldham died in Uxbridge in Middlesex in 1940. Her three-bar Hunger Strike Medal and other items from her time as a suffragette were sold by her family at auction in 2015 realising £23,450. The memorabilia was bought by a private collector in the UK.
