= Zoe Progl =

British criminal (1928–2021)

- Born: Zoie Tyldesley; 28 March 1928; Lambeth Hospital, South London, UK
- Died: Before 2021

Zoe Progl (28 March 1928 – before 2021) was a British criminal. Born into a poor family and with a father who was often drunk and in trouble with the police, Progl began stealing to feed herself from the age of six. She later progressed to shoplifting and worked in nightclubs where she fraternised with criminals. Progl married an American soldier at the age of 18, but soon left him and began carrying out burglaries with a new partner. Whilst three months pregnant, she was sentenced to three years detention at Aylesbury Borstal. After her release, she had an affair with Tommy "Scarface" Smithson, a London gangster whose gang included the Kray twins. She had a second child with Smithson before he left her.

Progl specialised in burglaries, shoplifting, and "jump ups", thefts of loaded lorries from the dockside. On one occasion, she stole £250,000 of fur clothing. She received a 3-month prison sentence for the robbery of an American soldier, and a 15-month sentence for the theft of a safe from a solicitor. In the mid 1950s, she became involved with drugs, and on one occasion attempted suicide. In Clapham, Progl operated a shop selling stolen goods from a garage and acted as getaway driver in a prison break from Wormwood Scrubs.

Progl received another prison sentence for burglary, and was sent to HM Prison Holloway in 1960. Before entering she had planned her escape and, on 24 July, became the first person to escape over the wall from the prison. She was recaptured 40 days later, and sentenced to an additional 18 months inside. During this period of imprisonment, she determined to reform and wrote an autobiography Woman of the Underworld. After her release, she married again, but left her husband after suffering domestic abuse. She later returned to crime, and received a further prison sentence.

== Early life ==
Progl was born Zoie Tyldesley in Lambeth Hospital, South London, on 28 March 1928. She was the third child of Majorie Gainey and Arthur Tyldesley, a lorry driver. She had two older brothers, one of whom, a merchant seaman, was lost at sea in 1939 after his vessel was torpedoed by a German submarine. As a child, Progl lived with her family in a run-down basement flat in a Limehouse slum. Her father was often drunk, and the flat was frequently visited by the police.

Progl began stealing from the age of six. Her first thefts were of foodstuffs from barges moored on the Thames as a means of feeding herself. In September 1940 Progl was evacuated to the countryside. She was hosted by a rich family who fed and clothed her well. Upon her return to London she determined to become rich by any means possible.

Progl carried out her first burglary at the age of 13, using the proceeds to have studio photographs taken of herself. She left school at the age of 14 to work in a Woolworth's shop, from which she stole cosmetics, concealed in her stockings. As a child, Progl was sexually abused by a cinema projectionist. In her teenage years, she found work in London nightclubs where she met the burglar Billy the Cat who taught her burglary techniques.

== Criminal career ==
The gates of Aylesbury prison c.1847, it was a girl's borstal when Progl was sent there in 1947

At the age of 18, Progl married Joe Progl, a master sergeant in the United States Army. She soon grew tired of life as an army housewife and left Progl. She became the partner of Johnny Gelley, a Canadian criminal. Progl accompanied Gelley and a friend to a mansion in Potters Bar, and kept watch from a stolen Jaguar while they stole £7,000 of fur clothing from the house. In May 1946, Gelley was arrested and sentenced to four years' imprisonment for the violent robbery of a clergyman. He escaped from Wormwood Scrubs Prison on 14 November, and returned to Progl. Progl afterwards accompanied Gelley in a raid on a Surrey sub-post office, getting away with £12,000 in cash and savings certificates. Their gang was infiltrated by a policewoman, posing as a prostitute, and the pair and an accomplice were arrested in February 1947 while attempting to use forged cheques and a stolen Post Office savings book.

Progl had thought she would receive a light sentence as it was her first recorded offence, and she was three months pregnant. However, the judge thought she was in need of reform and gave her three years' detention in a Borstal. She served her sentence at Aylesbury Borstal in Buckinghamshire. Her son, Tony, was born in the borstal and Progl learnt shoplifting techniques and the practice of "kiting" – buying goods with stolen cheques – from other inmates.

After her release, Progl had an affair with Tommy "Scarface" Smithson, a London gangster whose group included the Kray twins. Progl became pregnant, but did not tell Smithson, who was sent to prison in March 1949. When he was released, he found Progl and their son, Paul, living in "a house full of prostitutes". Smithson arranged a flat for Progl in Shrubland Road, Hackney. During this period, Progl found work at a factory long enough to discover that the payroll was delivered on a Thursday, and kept on the premises before pay day on Friday. One Thursday night, she left a window open to allow two of Smithson's gang to enter and remove the safe, containing £7,000. Smithson lost the entire haul within a week, gambling on cards, dice, and dog races. Smithson had left Progl by 4 September 1951, leaving her with a diamond ring worth £500 in case she needed money in an emergency.

Progl continued her criminal activities including burglary, robbery, and shoplifting, and would steal objects to order. One of her techniques was to affect a posh accent in jewellers and ask to see their most expensive rings. An accomplice would then enter and distract the shop assistant by asking to see watchstraps, while Progl stuck a ring below the counter with chewing gum. If the assistant questioned Progl she would flounce out stating that she had "never been so insulted in my life". The ring would then be retrieved by the accomplice. Progl also carried out "jump ups", the theft of loaded lorries from the London Docks, with an accomplice named Ches. On one occasion she stole £250,000 of fur clothing in a single heist.

Progl was sentenced to three months in HM Prison Holloway for the robbery of an American soldier. Upon her release, she moved into a 20-roomed house in Warwick Square, Pimlico, known to the police as the "Thieves Retreat". The house was frequently raided by the police, during which the inhabitants would move stolen goods between floors using a dumbwaiter. During one raid, Progl was arrested when police tracked a safe to her room by following scrape marks on the street. After her arrest, she phoned a local solicitor, seeking representation, but was refused as it was his safe that had been stolen. Progl was sentenced to 15 months in prison for this crime.

After her release Progl became involved in the London drugs scene, taking marijuana, cocaine, and heroin, and participating in wild sex parties. At one point, she attempted suicide with phenobarbitone tablets after a lover cheated on her. Progl later recalled stopping criminal activity for a while after Smithson's murder in 1956, which she said had a sobering effect on the London crime scene. Progl then moved to Clapham where she gave birth to a daughter, Tracy, in January 1957. Returning to jump-up heists, she rented a garage to store and sell her stolen goods, which became known to criminals as "The Shop". On 16 March 1958, Progl assisted in the escape of the robber Charles "Jumbo" Parsons from Wormwood Scrubs, driving a getaway car after he climbed the prison wall. Progl was nicknamed "Blonde Mickie" by the newspapers.

Progl was captured in 1960 after leaving a fingerprint at the scene of a burglary in Brighton, during which she had stolen jewellery. Progl normally wore gloves on her burglaries, but had left the print after a strip of celluloid, that she used to open locked doors, cut her gloves. She was arrested at her Clapham flat by the Flying Squad.

== Escape from Holloway and later life ==
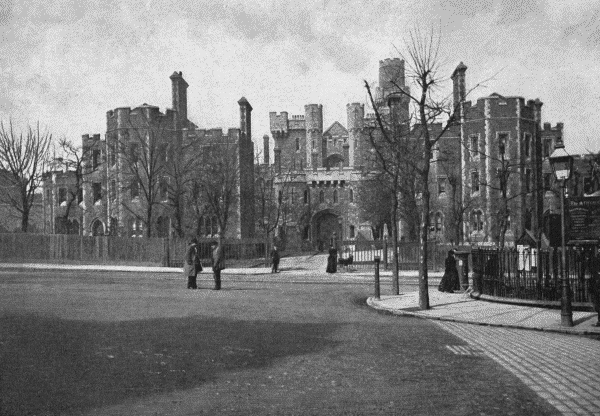
Holloway prison c.1896, it was rebuilt in modern style from 1971

Whilst on bail awaiting trial, Progl visited Holloway, where she assumed she would soon be returning, with her boyfriend (and a poodle, to avoid suspicion) to plan a later escape. She seems to have decided to try to become the first person to escape from the prison rather than simply skipping her bail. Progl discovered a door in the wall of the prison for which she had keys made, but was unable to open a second door further inside. She instead decided she would get out by climbing the wall, and identified a nearby Second World War bombsite as an ideal place to hide a ladder after the escape. Progl was convicted at trial and sentenced to prison for 2 years and 6 months, for which she would indeed be sent to Holloway for the fourth time.

When she entered Holloway, Progl acted like a model prisoner and, within weeks, was rewarded for her good behaviour by appointment as a trusty. She was tasked with cleaning the senior medical officer's room, and took advantage of its direct outside telephone line, one of the few in the prison, to call her boyfriend and plan her escape, setting a date of 24 July 1960. That morning she had been tasked to feed patients at the prison infirmary, and at 7.30 am, found she had a five-minute unsupervised period to escape. She clambered up a pile of coke to climb a 7 feet (2.1 m) high internal wall, whilst her boyfriend placed a metal ladder against the 25 feet (7.6 m) high perimeter wall. He then let down a rope ladder which Progl climbed. Two of Progl's female friends almost blew the escape as they had positioned themselves in a car at the main gate to watch the event and drew the guards' suspicions. Progl and her boyfriend escaped across the bombsite to a car and were joined there by their friends.

In an attempt to evade recapture, Progl dyed her blonde hair red and went with Tracy to a caravan site near Paignton, Devon, the same site that Parsons had fled to after his escape. Her escape, the first to be made by a woman over the wall at Holloway, was covered by the press who nicknamed her "Zippy Zoe". After two weeks in Devon Progl returned to London. Progl was spotted by a policeman after her stolen 1959 Ford Consul attracted his attention because it carried false 1958 number plates. Her arrest came 40 days after her escape.

Progl was sentenced to an additional 18 months imprisonment. During this period, she decided to reform her ways for the sake of her children. In prison she wrote an autobiography, Woman of the Underworld, which was edited by a News of the World writer, who added salacious details.

After her release, Progl married 24-year-old former merchant navy sailor Roy Boman in April 1964. She suffered domestic abuse, and they split afterwards. Though she claimed to have reformed she later returned to crime and received a further prison sentence for fraud and shoplifting. Progl died some time before 2021.
