= Holloway (film) =

Documentary film

- Directed by: Sophie Compton, Daisy-May Hudson
- Produced by: Alice Hughes, Polly Creed, and Sophie Compton
- Starring: Aliyah Ali, Mandy Ogunmokun, Tamar Mujanay, Gerrah, Lady Unchained, Sarah Cassidy
- Cinematography: Sarah Cunningham
- Edited by: Stella Heath Keir
- Music by: Adam Janota Bzowski
- Production companies: Power Play Productions, Beehive Films, Murmuration Productions, OL64.
- Release dates: October 2024 (BFI London); 20 June 2025
- Running time: 86 mins
- Country: United Kingdom
- Language: English

Holloway is a 2024 feature documentary film directed by Sophie Compton and Daisy-May Hudson. The film follows six women as they return to the abandoned Holloway Prison building where they were once imprisoned. It was co-created through a trauma-informed process with its contributors Aliyah Ali, Tamar Mujanay, Mandy Ogunmokun, Lady Unchained, Gerrah, and Sarah Cassidy. The film was produced by Alice Hughes, Polly Creed, and Sophie Compton.

The film had its world premiere in October 2024 at the BFI London Film Festival, where it played in competition and won the Audience Award for Best Documentary Feature. It had its international premiere at Hot Docs Canadian International Documentary Festival in April 2025. It was released in cinemas in the UK on 18 June 2025.

== Synopsis ==
The film follows six women as they returned to the abandoned Holloway Prison to take part in a women's circle before the site was demolished.

There, they retrace their steps through the empty site and take part in a 5-day therapeutic workshop, in which they explore and reflect on the experiences that led them to prison, as well as wider themes of healing, and overcoming generational trauma.

Through their individual experiences, the film shines a light on systemic issues within the criminal justice system, such as the disproportionate number of women in prison who were in care as children, and who have experienced domestic abuse. In the film, the contributors advocate for a more trauma-informed approach to the justice system, one that asks not "what's wrong with you, but instead what happened to you".

== Production ==
Holloway Prison closed in July 2016 after the then-Chancellor of the Exchequer, George Osborne, announced in his Autumn Statement on 25 November 2015 that the prison would be closed and demolished and the land sold for housing. The remaining women inside were moved to HMP Downview and HMP Bronzefield, both in Surrey.

The site was then purchased by the housing association Peabody, who are developing the site for housing and a women's building.

Before demolition work began on the site, the filmmakers secured access to film inside the prison in August 2021. The development, production and post-production process of filming the documentary was co-created with the six women in the film and was built using trauma-informed principles.

== Release and Reception ==
The film had its world premiere in October 2024 at the BFI London Film Festival, where it played in competition and won the Audience Award for Best Documentary Feature. It had its international premiere at Hot Docs Canadian International Documentary Festival in April 2025 and was released in cinemas in the UK from June 2025.

The film's reception on its release was positive. Danny Leigh from The Financial Times gave the film 5 stars. He described it as "a film of raw honesty and pinpoint self-awareness", which is "hard to shake".

Cath Clarke from The Guardian gave the film 4 stars, describing it as a "powerful documentary".

Kevin Maher in The Times also gave the film 4 stars, in particular praising the direction from Daisy-May Hudson and Sophie Compton.

The film was long-listed for Breakthrough Producer, Best Documentary and nominated for the Raindance Maverick Award at the British Independent Film Awards 2025. It was also award the Criminal Justice Alliance Award for Best Film 2025.
