= Florence Tunks =

British suffragette (1891–1985)

Florence Olivia Tunks
- Florence Olivia Tunks in 1914
- Born: 19 July 1891; Newport, Monmouthshire
- Died: 22 February 1985 (aged 93); Eastbourne, East Sussex, England
- Occupations: suffragette, bookkeeper and nurse
- Employer: Derbyshire Royal Infirmary
- Organization: Women's Social and Political Union

Florence Olivia Tunks (19 July 1891 – 22 February 1985) was a British suffragette, bookkeeper and nurse. She member of the Women's Social and Political Union (WSPU) who with Hilda Burkitt engaged in a campaign of arson in Suffolk in 1914 for which they both received prison sentences.

== Early life ==
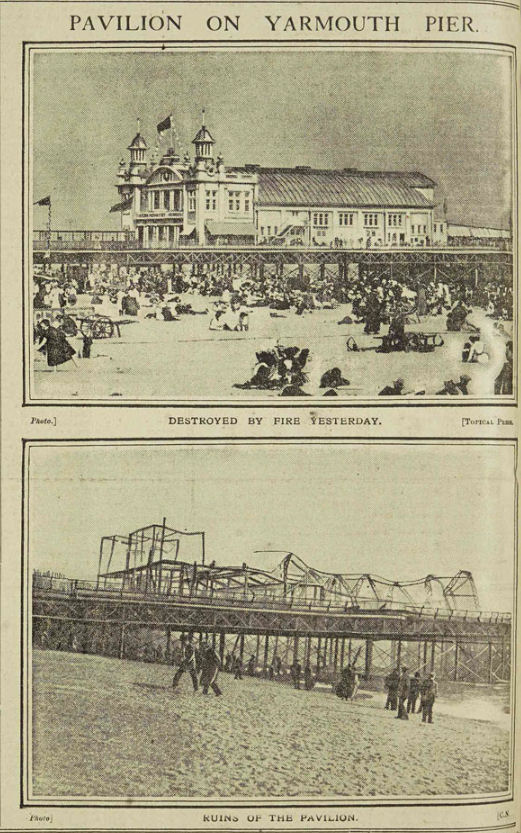
The Pavilion on Britannia Pier in Great Yarmouth before and after the arson attack in 1914

Tunks was born in Newport, Monmouthshire in 1891, the eldest of four daughters of Gilbert Samuel Tunks (1863–1933), an engineer, and Elizabeth "Bessie" Ann Tunks née Hall (1866–1947). From 1894 to 1911 the family lived in Cardiff, Wales where Gilbert Tunks ran a mechanical and electric engineers and oven builders which traded as Tunks and Co.

Tunks worked as a bookkeeper and lived with her parents and three sisters at 20 Bisham Gardens in Highgate, London.

== Activism ==
By 1914 Tunks had joined the WSPU and became a militant suffragette. In April 1914 Tunks and fellow-suffragette Hilda Burkitt burnt down two wheat stacks at Bucklesham Farm valued at £340, the Pavilion at the Britannia Pier in Great Yarmouth and the Bath Hotel in Felixstowe, causing £35,000 of damage to the latter as part of the campaign for women's suffrage. There were no occupants in either the Pavilion or the hotel.

The two women refused to answer questions in Court and sat on a table chatting throughout the proceedings with their backs to the magistrates. For her actions Tunks received a nine-month sentence which she served in Holloway Prison.

== Nursing ==
Tunks studied for a certificate in nursing between 1915 and 1918 at the Derbyshire Royal Infirmary in Derby and qualified as a nurse in London in 1923. In 1946 she is listed on the Nursing Register as living with her widowed mother in the family home at Bisham Gardens in Highgate, London. Her parents are buried together in Highgate Cemetery. She never married and died in Glindon Nursing Home on Lewes Road in Eastbourne, East Sussex in 1985 aged 93.

== Legacy ==
In 2014 The Felixstowe Society unveiled a plaque commemorating the burning down of the Bath Hotel in Felixstowe by Hilda Burkitt and Tunks in 1914. The plaque commemorates the centenary of the burning down of the hotel and is on what remains of the building, at the site of the former Bartlet Hospital.
