= HM Prison Holloway =

1852–2016 prison in London, England

HMP Holloway
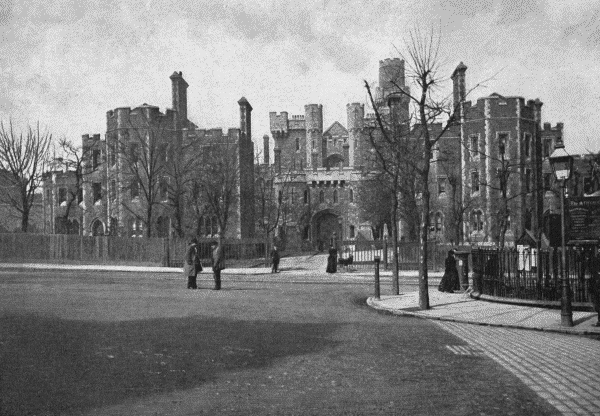
- Holloway Prison c. 1896
- Interactive map of HMP Holloway
- Location: Holloway, London, England; 51°33′15″N 00°07′30″W
- Security class: Adult female/Young offenders
- Population: 501 (January 2008)
- Opened: 1852
- Closed: 2016
- Managed by: HM Prison Services
- Website: Holloway at justice.gov.uk

HM Prison Holloway was a closed-category prison for adult women and young offenders in Holloway, London, England, operated by His Majesty's Prison Service. Opened in 1852 as a mixed-sex prison and made female-only in 1903, it was the largest women's prison in western Europe until its closure in 2016.

== History ==
Holloway Prison Act 1852
- Act of Parliament
- Parliament of the United Kingdom
- Long title: An Act for authorizing the Occupation of the House of Correction recently erected by and for the City of London at Holloway in the County of Middlesex.
- Citation: 15 & 16 Vict. c. 70
- Territorial extent: United Kingdom

Dates
- Royal assent: 30 June 1852
- Commencement: 30 June 1852 (Note: The Acts of Parliament (Commencement) Act 1793.)
- Repealed: 13 March 1975
Other legislation
Repealed by	Statute Law (Repeals) Act 1975

Status: Repealed

Text of statute as originally enacted

Holloway was opened in 1852 as a mixed-sex prison, but due to growing demand for space for female prisoners, particularly due to the closure of Newgate, it became female-only in 1903.

Before the First World War, Holloway was used to imprison those suffragettes who broke the law. These included Emmeline Pankhurst, Emily Davison, Constance Markievicz (also imprisoned for her part in the Irish Rebellion), Charlotte Despard, Mary Richardson, Dora Montefiore, Hanna Sheehy-Skeffington and Ethel Smyth. Constance Lytton was imprisoned twice: first under her real name, as a lady, the second time under the pseudonym Jane Warton, as a working-class woman.

In 1959, Joanna Kelley became Governor of Holloway. Kelley ensured that long-term prisoners received the best accommodation and they were allowed to have their own crockery, pictures and curtains. The prison created "family" groups of prisoners, group therapy and psychiatrists to support some prisoners where required.

In 1965, there was a change in responsibilities and the Probation Service was tasked with looking after prisoners once they had served their sentence. Kelley was not keen on the idea. With Kelley's encouragement, the Holloway Discharged Prisoners' Aide Society reformed into the Griffins Society, the name coming from the statues of two griffins that had been either side of the entrance gates to Holloway. The Griffins Society provided more services than its previous iteration, including accommodations for discharged prisoners, a meeting ground for imprisoned mothers and their children, a psychotherapy group, and a coffee bar. By 1994, the Society offered five hostels for discharged women, holding up to 65 women, and enabling a great deal of independence to former prisoners seeking to re-establish life after release.

Until 1991, the prison was staffed by female prison officers appointed by the Home Office. Male hospital officers from Pentonville were on weekly secondments until 1976. Their mission was to provide support for the agency nurses who worked in Holloway. The first 'Male, basic grade' Prison Officer to be posted to HMP Holloway in its (Female inmates only) history, was Prison Officer (Trg) Thomas Ainsworth, who joined the establishment direct from HMP College Wakefield in May 1991.

After the death from suicide in January 2016 of Sarah Reed, a paranoid schizophrenic being held on remand at Holloway, the subsequent inquest in July 2017 identified failings in the care system. Shortly after Reed died, a report concluded she was unfit to plead at a trial.

=== Rebuilding ===
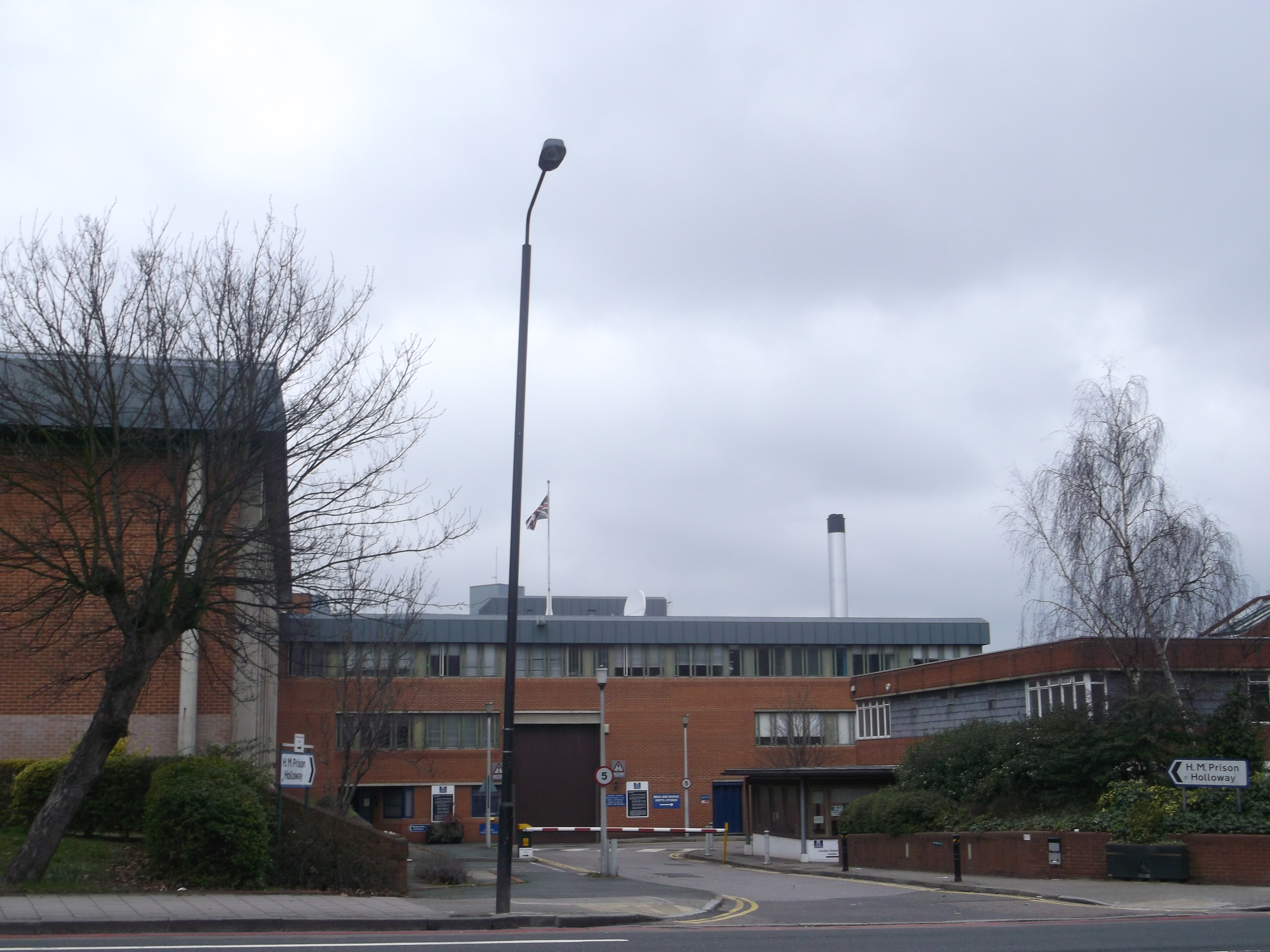
Prison exterior in 2013

Holloway's Governor Joanna Kelley was promoted to assistant director of prisons (women) in 1966. In 1967, they began to rebuild Holloway Prison. The previous design had been a "star" design where a single warder could oversee many potentially troublesome prisoners and then act promptly to summon assistance. Kelley felt this was wrong as at the time most women prisoners were not violent. It was her ideas that inspired the redesigned prison based on her experience as governor. The rebuilding was completed in 1977. During that time she had become an OBE in 1973. The new design allowed for "family" groups of sixteen prisoners. Her ideas were in the design of the buildings but her ideas were never enacted.

The redevelopment resulted in the loss of the "grand turreted" gateway to the prison, which had been built in 1851; the architectural critic Gavin Stamp later regretted the loss and said that the climate of opinion at the time was such that the Victorian Society felt unable to object.

=== Use ===
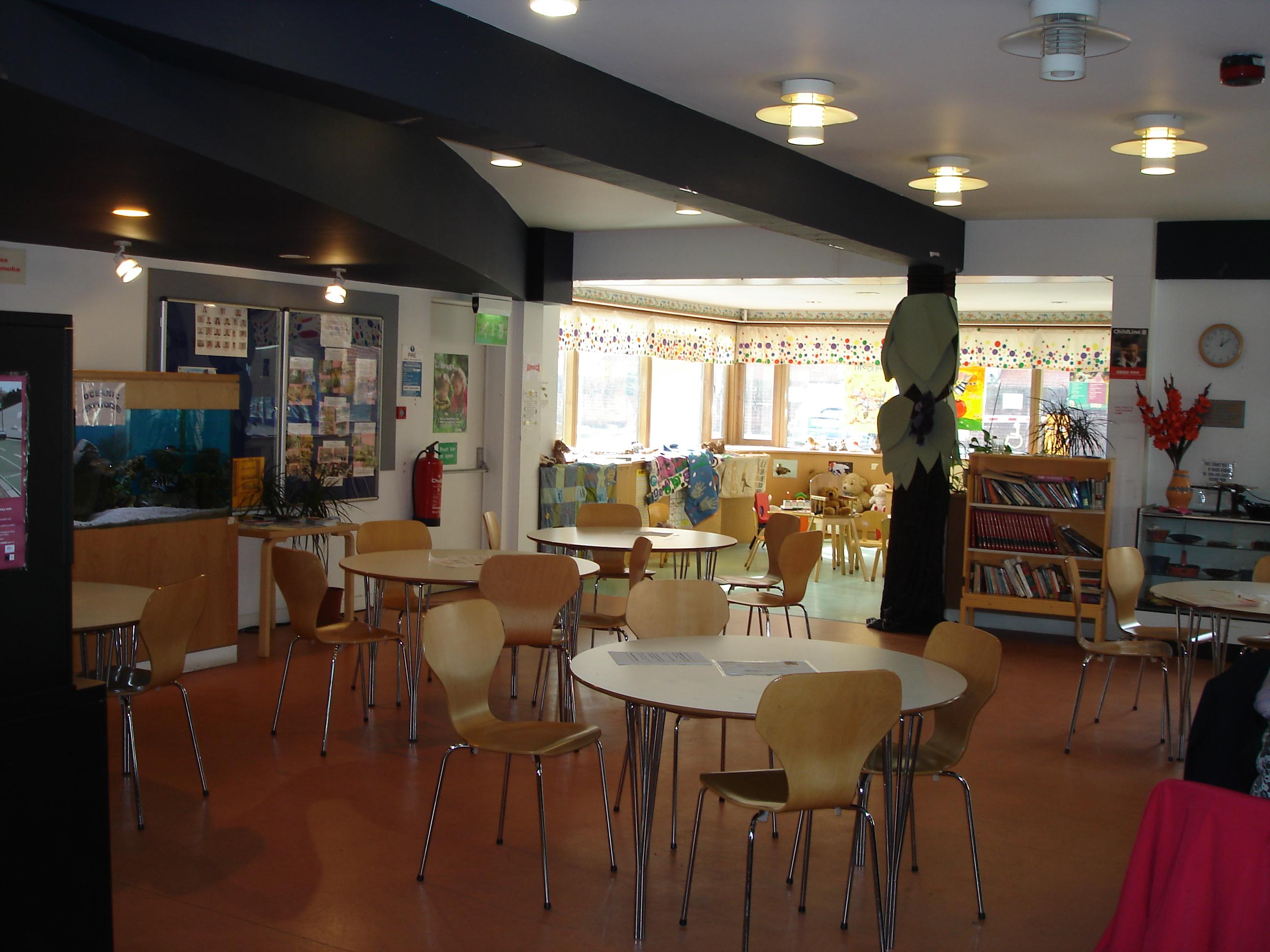
Holloway visitor centre

Holloway held female adults and young offenders remanded or sentenced by the local courts. Accommodation at the prison was mostly single cells; however, there was also some dormitory accommodation.

Holloway offered both full-time and part-time education to inmates, with courses including skills training workshops, British Industrial Cleaning Science (BICS), gardening, and painting.

There was a family-friendly visitors' centre, run by the Prison Advice and Care Trust (pact), an independent charity.

=== Closure ===
The then-Chancellor of the Exchequer, George Osborne, announced in his Autumn Statement on 25 November 2015 that the prison would be closed and demolished and the land sold for housing. It closed in July 2016, with the remaining prisoners being moved to HMP Downview and HMP Bronzefield, both in Surrey.

The site was sold by the Ministry of Justice to Peabody in 2019 for £82M, of which £42M was loaned to it by the Greater London Authority. Peabody hoped to build 1,000 homes on the site with their partner London Square, and in 2022, Islington Council granted planning permission for their eventual 985 home scheme to go ahead. Demolition of the prison began that same year and was completed by the end of 2023. Prior to the demolition, the documentary Holloway was filmed in the disused prison, a portrait of six former inmates reflecting on their backgrounds which lead them to prison and their lives since. The housing development, named Holloway Park, is due to see completion of its first phase in 2027.

== Notable inmates ==
=== Suffragettes ===
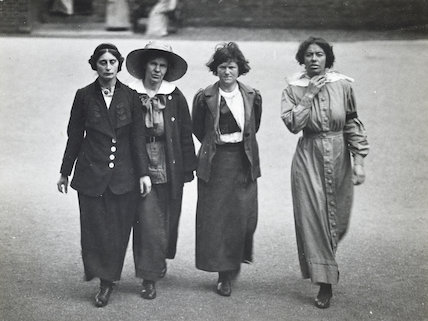
British police began using covert photography as a means to document suffragettes in Holloway Prison under falsified names, for later identification

For decades, British campaigners had argued for votes for women. It was only when a number of suffragists, despairing of change through peaceful means, decided to turn to militant protest that the "suffragette" was born. These women broke the law in pursuit of their aims, and many were imprisoned at Holloway for their criminal activity. They were not treated as political prisoners, the authorities arguing they were imprisoned for their vandalism, not their opinions. In protest, some went on hunger strike and were force fed so Holloway has a large symbolic role in the history of women's rights in the UK for those in sympathy with the movement. Suffragettes imprisoned there include Emmeline Pankhurst, Emily Davison, Violet Mary Doudney, Constance Lytton, Katie Edith Gliddon, Isabella Potbury, Evaline Hilda Burkitt, Georgina Fanny Cheffins, Constance Bryer, Florence Tunks, Janie Terrero, Doreen Allen, Bertha Ryland, Katharine Gatty, Charlotte Despard, Janet Boyd, Genie Sheppard, Mary Ann Aldham, Mary Richardson, Muriel and Arabella Scott, Alice Maud Shipley, Katherine Douglas Smith, Dora Montefiore, Christabel Pankhurst, Hanna Sheehy-Skeffington, Emily Townsend, Leonora Tyson, Miriam Pratt, Ethel Smyth, Victoria Lidiard and the American Alice Paul. Detainees later received the Holloway brooch. In 1912 the anthem of the suffragettes – "The March of the Women", composed by Ethel Smyth with lyrics by Cicely Hamilton – was performed there.

=== Irish Republicans ===
Holloway held women closely associated with the Irish Easter Rebellion of 1916 and the women's paramilitary organisation Cumann na mBan: Maud Gonne, Kathleen Clarke, Hanna Sheehy-Skeffington and Constance Markievicz.

=== Fascists ===
During World War II, Holloway was used to detain individuals under Defence Regulation 18B, which allowed the internment of persons suspected of posing a threat to national security. Among those held was Diana Mitford, who was later joined by her husband, Sir Oswald Mosley, following a personal intervention by the prime minister, Winston Churchill. The couple was permitted to live together in a cottage within the prison grounds until their release in 1943.

Norah Elam—previously known as Dacre Fox during her suffragette activism in World War I—was also detained under Regulation 18B in 1940. She had been imprisoned multiple times in 1914 and later became associated with the social circle surrounding the Mosleys during their early internment. After her release, Elam became the only former member of the British Union of Fascists known to have been granted a visit with Mosley during his detention.

Fridel Meyer, a German national who was not affiliated with fascist politics, was likewise interned at Holloway in 1939 under Regulation 18B due to her nationality. She was released after six months following the intervention of barrister Norman Birkett.

=== Executions ===
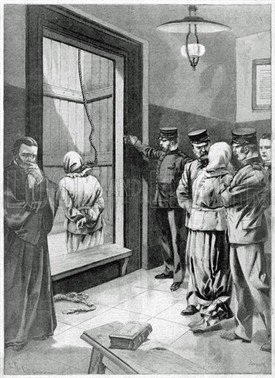
The double execution of Sach and Walters at Holloway Prison

Between 1903 and 1955, five judicial executions by hanging were carried out at Holloway Prison:

- Amelia Sach and Annie Walters (3 February 1903)
- Edith Thompson (9 January 1923)
- Styllou Christofi (13 December 1954)
- Ruth Ellis (13 July 1955; last woman to be executed in the United Kingdom)

Following standard practice of the time, the bodies of those executed were buried in unmarked graves within the prison grounds. During a major redevelopment of the prison in 1971, the remains were exhumed. The remains of four of the women—Sach, Walters, Thompson, and Christofi—were reinterred in a shared grave at Brookwood Cemetery in Surrey. Ellis was reburied in the churchyard of St Mary’s Church in Amersham. In 2018 Edith Thompson’s remains were moved again and reburied in her parents’ grave at the City of London Cemetery.

=== Other inmates ===
Noteworthy inmates that were held at the original 1852-era prison include Oscar Wilde, William Thomas Stead, Isabella Glyn, F. Digby Hardy, Kitty Byron, Lady Ida Sitwell, wife of Sir George Sitwell, and Kate Meyrick the 'Night Club Queen'. The robber Zoe Progl became the first woman to escape over the wall of the prison in 1960.

Leander Starr Jameson, who had been arrested after the 1895-1896 Jameson Raid into the South African Republic for which he was tried in England, was sentenced to 15 months, which he served in Holloway Prison, for leading the raid..

Christine Keeler, the central figure of the Profumo affair, was imprisoned at Holloway Prison for six months following her conviction of perjury in December 1963.

More recently it housed, in 1966, Myra Hindley, one of the Moors murderers; in 1967, Kim Newell, a Welsh woman who was involved in the Red Mini Murder; also in the late 1960s, National Socialist supporter Françoise Dior, charged with arson against synagogues; in 1977, American Joyce McKinney of the "Manacled Mormon case"; between 1991 and 1993, Michelle and Lisa Taylor, the sisters convicted of the murder of Alison Shaughnessy before being controversially released on appeal a year later; Sheila Bowler, the music teacher wrongly imprisoned for the murder of her elderly aunt, was detained there before being transferred to Bullwood Hall; and in 2002, Maxine Carr, who gave a false alibi for the Soham murderer Ian Huntley. In 2000 Dena Thompson was also known to have been imprisoned at Holloway for attempted murder, before she was convicted of murdering another victim. Sharon Carr, Britain's youngest female murderer who killed aged only 12, also spent time at Holloway.

The prison-reform activist Chris Tchaikovsky served 15 months' imprisonment at Holloway in the early 1970s; her experiences there led to her establishing Women in Prison, a charity focused on supporting women in the criminal justice system.

Other inmates included Linda Calvey, Chantal McCorkle, and Emma Humphreys.

In 2014 the disgraced judge and barrister Constance Briscoe began a 16-month sentence at the prison.

== Inspections, inquiries and reports ==
In October 1999, it was announced that healthcare campaigner and agony aunt Claire Rayner had been called in to advise on an improved healthcare provision at Holloway. Rayner's appointment was announced after the introduction of emergency measures at the prison's healthcare unit after various failures.

In September 2001, an inspection report from His Majesty's Chief Inspector of Prisons claimed that Holloway was failing many of its inmates, mainly due to financial pressures. However, the report stated that the prison had improved in a number of areas, and praised staff working at the jail.

In March 2002, managers at Holloway were transferred to other prisons following an inquiry by the Prison Service. The inquiry followed a number of allegations from prison staff concerning sexual harassment, bullying and intimidation from managers. The inquiry supported some of these claims.

An inspection report from June 2003, stated that conditions had improved at Holloway. However, it criticised levels of hygiene at the jail, as well as the lack of trained staff, and poor safety for inmates. A further inspection report in September 2008 again criticised safety levels for inmates of Holloway, claiming that bullying and theft were rife at the prison. The report also noted high levels of self-harm and poor mental health among the inmates.

A further inspection in 2010 again noted improvements but found that most prisoners said they felt unsafe and that there remained 35 incidents a week of self-harm. The prison's operational capacity is 501.

=== Sarah Reed case ===
On 11 January 2016, Sarah Reed, an inmate at Holloway, was found dead in her cell. Her family was told by prison staff that she had strangled herself while lying on her bed. For The Observer, Yvonne Roberts wrote "Sarah's final days were harrowing. She was hallucinating, chanting, without the medication she had relied on for years, sleepless, complaining a demon punched her awake at night. She was on a basic regime, punishment for what was classed as bad behaviour. In spite of her mental and physical fragility, she was isolated, the cell hatch closed, without hot water, heating or a properly cleaned cell. 'For safety and security' a four-strong 'lockdown' team of prison officers delivered basic care." Observations of Reed had been cut to only one an hour though she was obviously severely psychotic, had threatened suicide and had self-harmed. A prison officer told Reed's mother, "We deal with restraint and maintaining the law. We're not designed to deal with health issues."

The jury at her inquest decided that Reed took her own life when the balance of her mind was disturbed, but were unclear whether she had intended to kill herself. They said failure to manage her medication and the failure to complete the fitness to plead assessment in a reasonable time were factors in her death. The jury were also concerned about how Reed was monitored and claimed Reed received inadequate treatment in prison for her distress.

Deborah Coles of the charity Inquest said: "Sarah Reed was a woman in torment, imprisoned for the sake of two medical assessments to confirm what was resoundingly clear, that she needed specialist care not prison. Her death was a result of multi-agency failures to protect a woman in crisis. Instead of providing her with adequate support, the prison treated her ill mental health as a discipline, control and containment issue."

== In popular culture ==
=== Film ===
- The 1953 movie, "Turn the Key Softly" featured Holloway Prison.
- One of the characters in the 1997 Canadian sci-fi/horror movie Cube is named after Holloway Prison.

=== Literature ===
- In Elizabeth George's 1994 novel Playing for the Ashes, a character is expected to be sent to Holloway if convicted.
- In Dorothy L. Sayers's novel Strong Poison, Harriet Vane is held in HM Holloway Prison during the trial.
- In Robert Galbraith's 2014 novel "The Silkworm", Leonora Quine is sent to Holloway to await trial
- In 'Prisons & Prisoners, The stirring testimony of a suffragette', lady Constance Lytton / Jane Warton tells about her time in Holloway and Newcastle prison as a suffragette.

=== Music ===
- Belle and Sebastian's "The Boy with the Arab Strap" draws inspiration from a drive past the prison for the first verse.
- The band Bush wrote a song about the prison called "Personal Holloway," on their album Razorblade Suitcase.
- The Kinks' "Holloway Jail" appears on Muswell Hillbillies.
- Marillion's song "Holloway Girl" is on their album Seasons End.
- Million Dead have "Holloway Prison Blues" on their album Harmony No Harmony.
- In Potter Payper's 2013 album Training day, it is mentioned his mother attended Holloway prison in the song 'Purple Rain'- "they said my mummy went on holiday, I found out my mummy was in Holloway"

=== Television ===
- In the Thames Television series Rumpole Of The Bailey episode "Rumpole and the Alternative Society," the girl whom Rumpole was defending (until she admitted her guilt to him) was sentenced to three years imprisonment which she served at HM Holloway Prison.
- In the TV series Upstairs, Downstairs, the second-season episode "A Special Mischief" has Elizabeth Bellamy joining a band of suffragettes who go out one night vandalising wealthy homes. Rose, the parlourmaid, follows them; they are apprehended by the police. Rose is mistakenly thought to be a suffragette and is put in a ladies' prison, and Holloway is very much implied. Elizabeth is spared going to jail as her bail is paid for by Julius Karekin, one of the rich men being targeted. Elizabeth and Karekin bail Rose out of prison.

Caitlin Davies has written Bad Girls (published by John Murray), a history of Holloway Prison. The prison closed in July 2016; the site is being redeveloped for housing and a Women's Building as a transformative justice project. Davies was the only journalist granted access to the prison and its archives. Women in prison" Man Alive BBC Series (1972 Documentary)
