= Britannia Pier =

Pier with a theatre in Great Yarmouth, England

Coordinates: 52.6082°N 1.7398°E

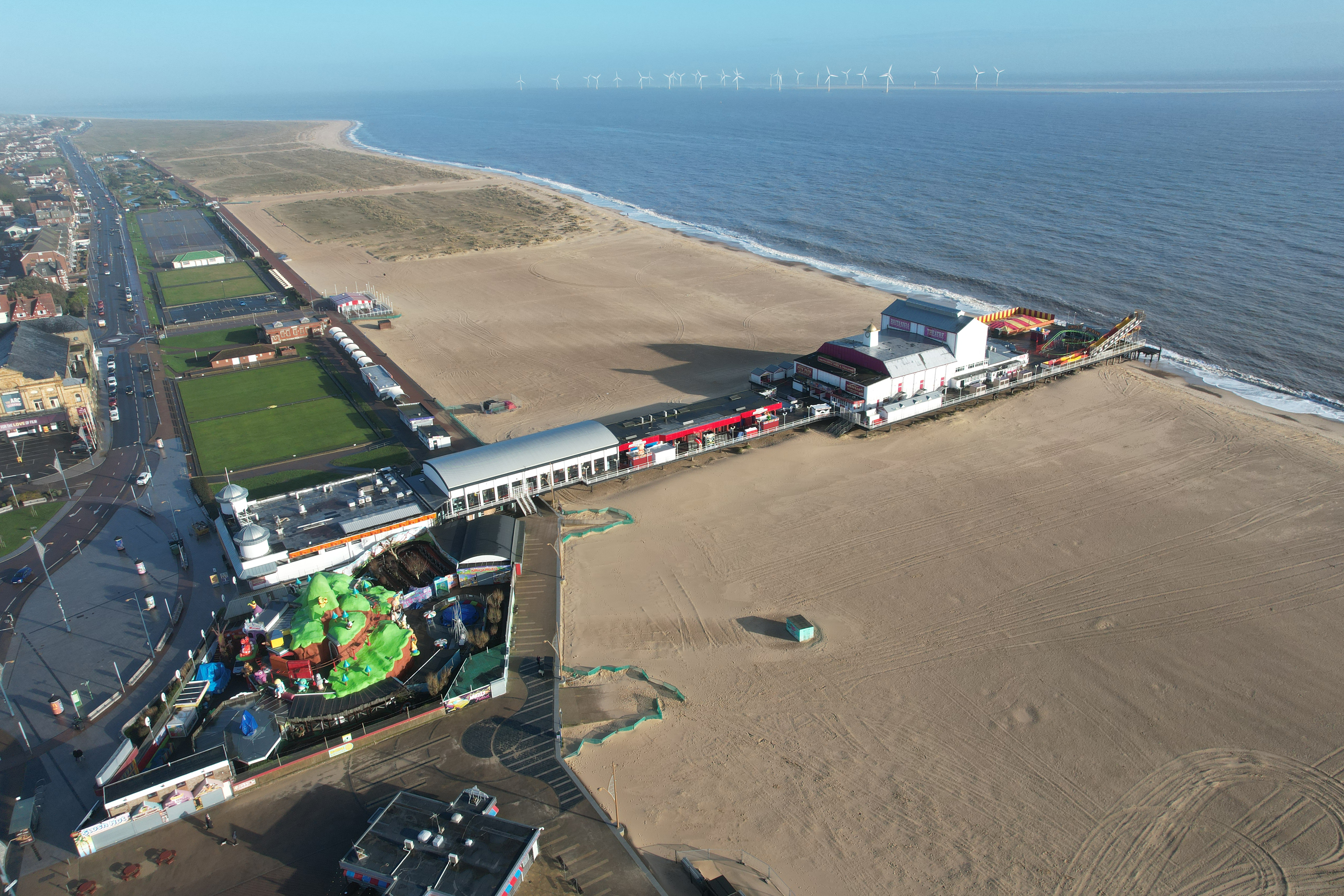
- Britannia Pier in 2026
- Location: Great Yarmouth, Norfolk

Characteristics
- Total length: 810 feet (250 m)

History
- Designer: Joseph and Arthur Mayoh
- Opening date: 1901; 125 years ago

Britannia Pier is a pier located at the seaside town of Great Yarmouth in the English county of Norfolk.

== History ==
=== Planning and construction ===
Great Yarmouth Britannia Pier Act 1857
- Act of Parliament
- Parliament of the United Kingdom
- Long title: An Act for constructing and maintaining a Pier at Great Yarmouth in the County of Norfolk, to be called "The Great Yarmouth Britannia Pier."
- Citation: 20 & 21 Vict. c. xxviii

Dates
- Royal assent: 3 July 1857

Other legislation
- Repealed by: Great Yarmouth New Britannia Pier Act 1899

Status: Repealed

Text of statute as originally enacted

A new pier in Great Yarmouth was first proposed in 1856. It was authorised by the Great Yarmouth Britannia Pier Act 1857 (20 & 21 Vict. c. xxviii), with building work commencing in September 1857 with engineer, surveyor and antiquary Alfred William Morant (1828–81) as the designer. A. W. Morant went on to become City Surveyor for Norwich.

=== Original pier ===
The completed pier opened on 13 July 1858 at cost of £6,000 and was originally 700 feet long but this length was reduced by about 80 feet in 1859 when the sloop James and Jessie collided with the structure during the Royal Charter Storm. The length was again reduced as the result of storm damage in 1868. The pier was demolished in 1899.

=== New pier ===
Great Yarmouth New Britannia Pier Act 1899
- Act of Parliament
- Parliament of the United Kingdom
- Long title: An Act to incorporate a Company for the purpose of acquiring the existing Great Yarmouth Britannia Pier and of constructing a new and improved Pier in lieu thereof and for other purposes.
- Citation: 62 & 63 Vict. c. civ

Dates
- Royal assent: 13 July 1899

Other legislation
- Repeals/revokes: Great Yarmouth Britannia Pier Act 1857

Text of statute as originally enacted

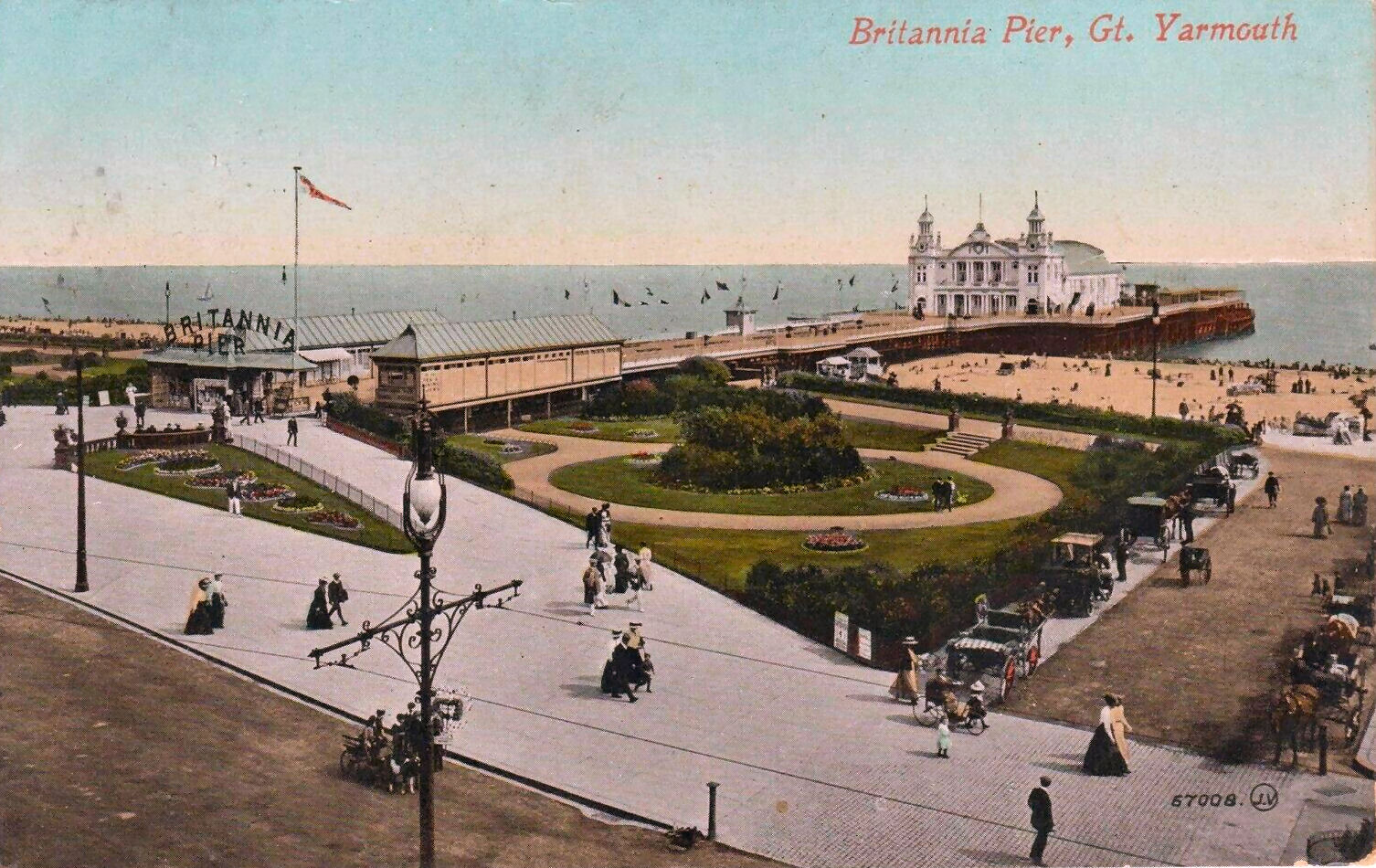
Britannia Pier and Gardens in 1911

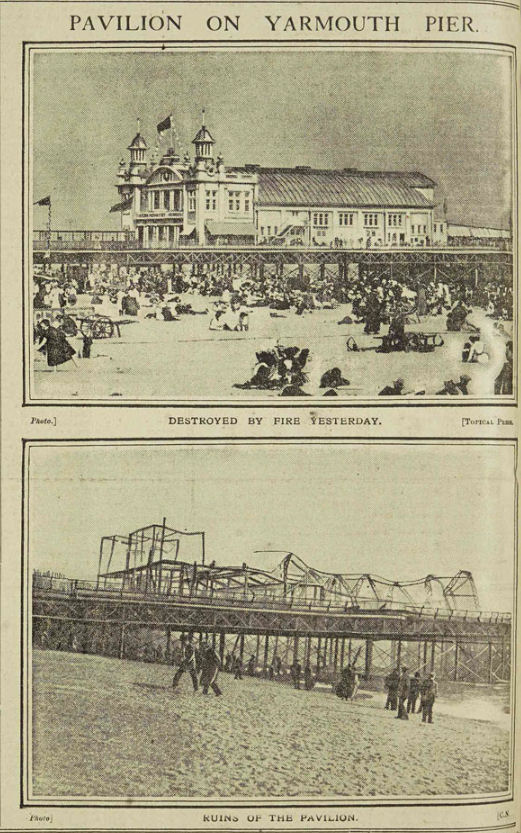
The Pavilion on Britannia Pier in Great Yarmouth before and after the arson attack by suffragettes in 1914

The building of a new pier was autorised by the Great Yarmouth New Britannia Pier Act 1899 (62 & 63 Vict. c. civ) and commenced on 13 December 1900 to a design by engineers Joseph and Arthur Mayoh. This 810 foot pier deck with a temporary pavilion at the pier's far end opened in 1901, with the temporary pavilion eventually being replaced with a Grand Pavilion which opened on 21 June 1902. This Grand Pavilion was destroyed in a fire on 22 December 1909. A second pavilion designed by Douglass & Arnott was completed in 1910 but this too was to burn down on 17 April 1914 as a result of an arson attack by militant suffragettes Hilda Burkitt and Florence Tunks, both of whom received prison sentences. A third pavilion was hastily constructed and opened on 27 July 1914.

==== Damage and closure ====
The pier's Floral Hall Ballroom opened in May 1928 but was destroyed by fire in August 1932. A new Grand Ballroom opened in 1933, but this too was destroyed by fire in April 1954, along with the third pavilion. The pier was closed and sectioned during World War II and re-opened in 1947 after essential repairs including replacing sections removed during wartime to prevent enemy troops using the pier as a landing station.

==== Post war ====
The present pavilion opened on 27 June 1958 and was home to the Pavilion Theatre (today called the Britannia Pier Theatre), but the ballroom (called the Ocean Ballroom from 1947) was never replaced.

== Facilities ==
Britannia Pier was previously owned by First Leisure plc. It was purchased by Family Amusements Ltd who also own the Wellington Pier further south along the seafront. In 2022 it was purchased by Triangle Amusements. Today the pier continues to provide live theatre shows and has a variety of food outlets, bars, amusements and fairground rides.
