= Victoria Lidiard =

British suffragette

- Born: Victoria Simmons; 23 December 1889; Bristol, England
- Died: 3 October 1992 (aged 102); Hove, England

Victoria Lidiard (23 December 1889 – 3 October 1992) was an English social activist, optician and Christian author, reputed to be the longest surviving suffragette in the UK. Lidiard campaigned for animal welfare, vegetarianism and the ordination of women.

== Biography ==
Victoria Simmons was born on 23 December 1889 in Clifton, Bristol, part of a large family of 13 children. She was educated in a local Dame school, leaving at aged 14 to work in a photographic studio, whilst studying bookkeeping and shorthand in the evenings.

With her mother and other of her sisters, and against her father's wishes, she joined the Women's Social and Political Union (WSPU) in 1907 after hearing Annie Kenney, WSPU's West of England organiser, speak. Simmons became a local activist, speaking on her own account, notably at Bristol Docks; selling Votes for Women, the WSPU newspaper; and engaging in mild protest - chalking slogans around Clifton; and disrupting political meetings.

Although initially unwilling to engage in more militant activities of the sort advocated by Emmeline Pankhurst and WSPU starting in 1908, she joined in a WSPU actions, possibly including a 1 March 1908 window-breaking protest in central London's shopping area - Regent Street, Piccadilly, the Strand, Oxford Street and Bond Street; but certainly in a 4 March 1912 to break windows in Whitehall, where she was arrested for smashing a War Office window. Tried and convicted, she received a 2-month sentence in Holloway Prison.

During World War I, WSPU entered into a moratorium on protest. Lidiard and a sister spent the war in Kensington managing a guest-house, Lidiard undertaking weekend munitions work at Battersea Power Station assembling anti-aircraft shells. She married in 1918 Alexander Lidiard, then serving as major with the 3rd Manchester Rifles battalion, and who was an active member of the Men's League for Women's Suffrage. She trained as an optician after the war and with her husband operated optician practices in Maidenhead and High Wycombe.

As one of the longest surviving Suffragettes, she was interviewed towards the end of her life by the BBC. She was also interviewed by Brian Harrison, in March 1976, as part of the Suffrage Interviews project, titled Oral evidence on the suffragette and suffragist movements: the Brian Harrison interviews. Lidiard talked to Harrison about her family background, her involvement in the suffrage movement, her time in Holloway Prison, and her work as an optician.

Her life is marked by a blue plaque in Hove.

== Personal life ==
Lidiard became a vegetarian at the age of 10 and remained interested in animal welfare her entire life. Her vegetarian diet bewildered the authorities at Holloway Prison who gave her an excessive quantity of "almost half a pound of butter beans".

Lidiard was socially active throughout her life, involving herself in animal welfare campaigns such as for the improvement of conditions under which livestock was transported; holding positions on a local church council, and serving as a member of the National Council. Towards the end of her life she campaigned with the Movement for the Ordination of Women, drawing an exact parallel between that and the suffrage work of her youth.

She wrote and published two books, Christianity, Faith, Love and Healing (1988) and Animals and All Churches (1989).

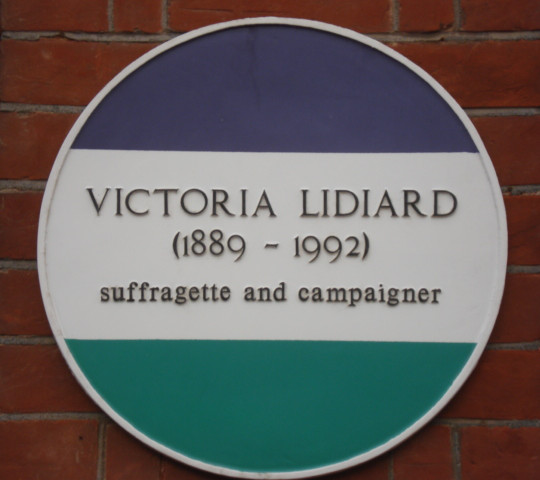
Commemorative plaque in WSPU colours erected in Hove to mark the life of Victoria Lidiard

She died in Hove, East Sussex on 3 October 1992.
