= Portrait of Henry James =

Painting by John Singer Sargent

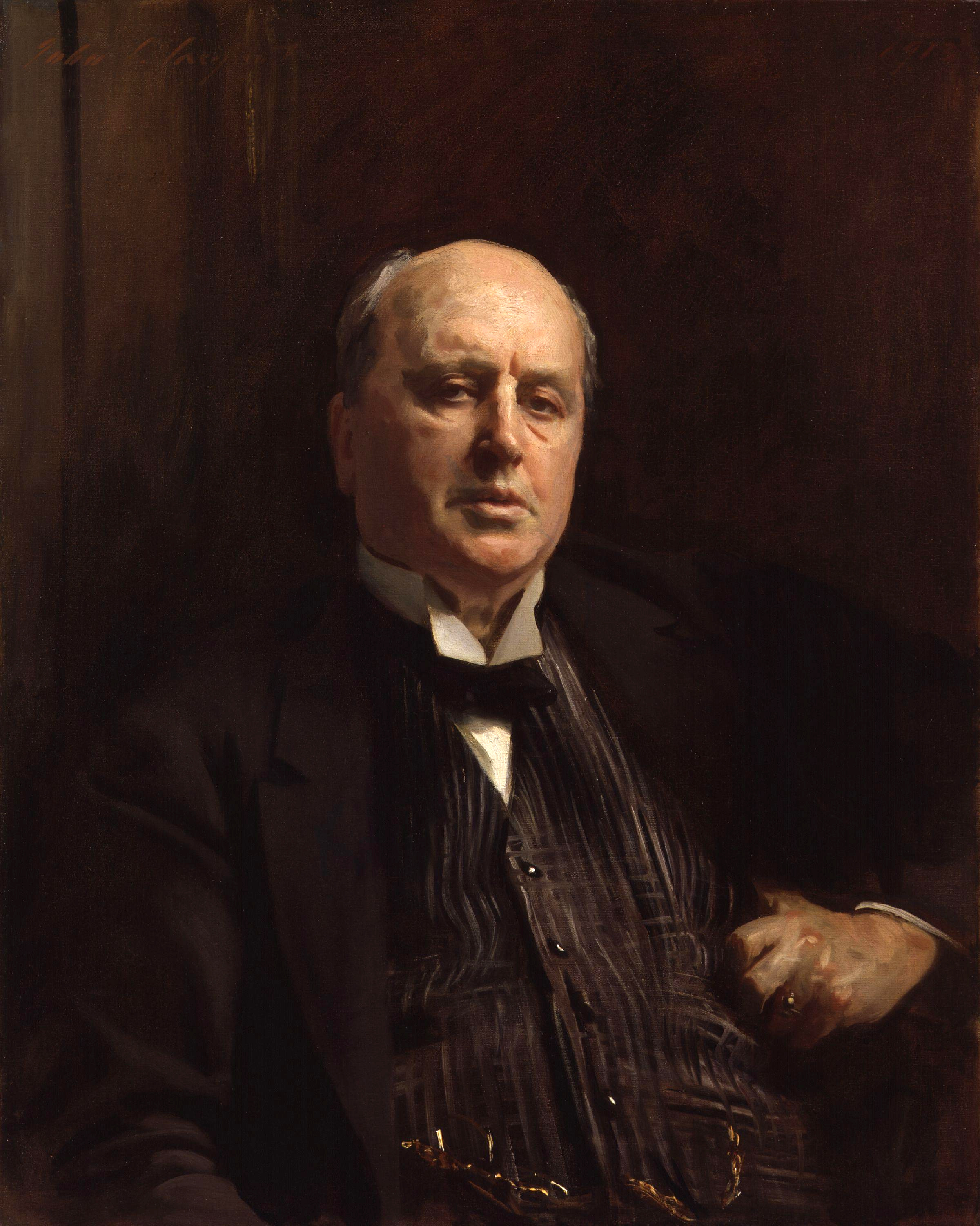
- Artist: John Singer Sargent
- Year: 1913
- Type: Oil on canvas, portrait
- Dimensions: 85.1 cm × 67.3 cm (33.5 in × 26.5 in)
- Location: National Portrait Gallery, London

Portrait of Henry James is a 1913 portrait Painting by the Anglo-American artist John Singer Sargent. It depicts the American writer Henry James, who like Sargent had settled and worked in London. James was known for his novels such as Washington Square, The Bostonians and The Turn of the Screw.

The painting was commissioned by a group of subscribers to celebrate the novelist's seventieth birthday. In the event Singer Sargent, an old friend of James’s, waived his fee for the picture. James was impressed with the work which he considered "a living breathing likeness and a masterpiece of painting". It was displayed at the Royal Academy's Summer Exhibition of 1914 at Burlington House where it was physically attacked by a suffragette Mary Wood who slashed it three times with a cleaver. The painting is now in the National Portrait Gallery in London, having been bequeathed by James in 1916.

== See also ==
- List of works by John Singer Sargent

== Bibliography ==
- Anesko, Michael. Henry James Framed: Material Representations of the Master. University of Nebraska Press, 2012.
- Fairbrother, Trevor J. John Singer Sargent: The Sensualist. Seattle Art Museum, 2000.
- Kim, Jongwoo Jeremy. Painted Men in Britain, 1868–1918: Royal Academicians and Masculinities. Taylor & Francis, 2017.
