= Rose Lamartine Yates =

English social campaigner and suffragette

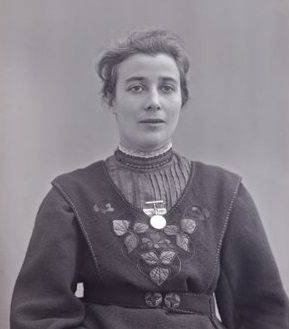
Yates in about 1909

Rose Emma Lamartine Yates (née Janau; 23 February 1875 – 5 November 1954) was an English social campaigner and suffragette. She was educated at the Sorbonne and Oxford.

Together with her lawyer husband she worked for female suffrage from 1908 and during the First World War, and was willing to suffer arrest and incarceration for her beliefs. She travelled widely, giving lectures. She and her husband were also leading members of the Cyclists' Touring Club. After the war she was elected to the London County Council, where she campaigned for equal pay for men and women, better public housing, and the provision of nursery education. She later led the building of an archive of the suffrage campaign.

== Life and career ==
Yates was born in Dalyell Road, Lambeth, London, to a language teacher, Elphège Bertoni Victor Janau (b. 1847), and his wife, Marie Pauline (1841–1909), both French-born and naturalised British citizens. She was the youngest of their three children. She was educated at high schools in Clapham and Truro, and later at Kassel and the Sorbonne, Paris. From 1896, she attended the Royal Holloway College where she studied modern languages and philology. She passed the Oxford final honours examination in 1899.

In 1900, she married a widower, Thomas Lamartine Yates (né Swindlehurst; 1849–1929). He was a solicitor, with a successful practice in Court of Chancery. (Note: Thomas and most of his family changed their surname after his father, William Swindlehurst, was convicted of fraud in 1877.) Eight years after the marriage their only child, Paul (1908–2009), was born; he became an agricultural economist. Both Thomas and Rose Lamartine Yates were keen cyclists, and were leading members of the Cyclists' Touring Club. In 1907 she was the first woman elected to the governing council of the club. She did not at that point consider herself a suffragette, but soon concluded "on looking into the matter seriously I find I have never been anything else [and] I came to realise that I was and must remain one at whatever personal cost". She joined the recently founded Wimbledon branch of the Women's Social and Political Union (WSPU) in 1908.

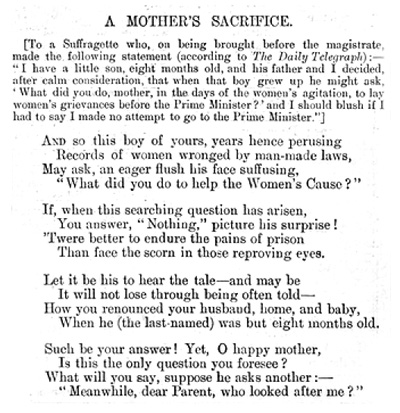
Punch's verse prompted by Lamartine Yates's arrest in 1909

On 24 February 1909, Yates was a member of a deputation led by Emmeline Pethick-Lawrence from Caxton Hall to the House of Commons. She was arrested, along with 28 other demonstrators, charged with obstruction and sentenced to a month's imprisonment. She said of her actions that "every woman must have the courage of her convictions, and not slink back when she has taken her first step". Her son was eight months old at the time, and Punch printed a set of verses criticising her for abandoning him. Her political activism had the full support of her husband, who defended her at the trial.

In 1910, Lamartine Yates became honorary secretary of the Wimbledon WSPU. Under her leadership it became one of the most flourishing branches of the organisation. Among those who came to address the branch were Mary Gawthorpe, George Lansbury and an old college friend, Emily Davison. She travelled widely, giving lectures. She and her husband made their house Dorset Hall in Merton a refuge where activists released from prison could recuperate. When the 1911 census was taken she participated in the suffragette boycott by refusing to giver her information to the enumerator.

In 1911, Thomas Lamartine Yates was arrested during a demonstration against the government for blocking a bill to allow limited female suffrage. He was not charged, but the publicity damaged his law firm for a time. He made himself available as legal adviser to WSPU prisoners, and, in June 1913, he represented the Davison family at the inquest into Emily Davison's death after throwing herself under the king's horse at the Derby. Together with Mary Leigh, Rose was at the dying Davison's bedside, and headed a guard of honour for the funeral procession.

At the beginning of the First World War the Wimbledon WSPU converted its meeting room and shop into a soup kitchen and opened another in nearby Merton. The war precipitated a split between Lamartine Yates and the leading suffragette, Emmeline Pankhurst. Under the latter's leadership the WSPU suspended its militant campaign for female suffrage, instead backing the government in the fight against Germany. Lamartine Yates and others disagreed with this policy. She chaired a meeting of WSPU members and ex-members on 22 October 1915 where a resolution was passed that "this meeting protests against the action of the W.S.P.U. officials whereby the Union's name and its platform are no longer used for women's suffrage and to remedy the innumerable disabilities of unenfranchised women". They also called for a full financial audit of the organisation and a copy of the resolution was sent to Pankhurst. The women formed a new body, the Suffragettes of the WSPU.

In the general election of 1918, in which for the first time, limited female suffrage was granted, Lamartine Yates was adopted as Labour candidate for the Wimbledon constituency, but both she and the Liberal candidate withdrew shortly before polling. The following year she was elected to the London County Council, its only independent member. Seven other women candidates stood successfully in the same election. She served for three years, championing equal pay, increased public housing, and the provision of nursery education.

Lamartine Yates led the way in building an archive of the suffrage campaign, and, in 1939, she opened the Women's Record House in Great Smith Square, London. The building was bombed during the Second World War, but some of its records were saved and were moved to the Suffragette Fellowship collection in the Museum of London.

Rose Lamartine Yates died of colon cancer at home in Wandsworth, London at the age of 79.

== Notes, references and sources ==
=== Sources ===
- Crawford, Elizabeth (1999). The Women's Suffrage Movement : A Reference Guide, 1866-1928. London: UCL Press. ISBN 978-1-84142-031-8.
