= Evaline Hilda Burkitt =

British suffragette

Evaline Hilda Burkitt by her sister Lillian, who was also a suffragette

Evaline Hilda Burkitt (19 July 1876 – 7 March 1955) was a British suffragette and member of the Women's Social and Political Union (WSPU). A militant activist for women's rights, she went on hunger strike in prison and was the first suffragette to be forcibly-fed. Between 1909 and 1914 she was force-fed 292 times and was the last woman to be so treated in Holloway Prison. She was a recipient of the WSPU's Hunger Strike Medal.

== Life and Activism ==
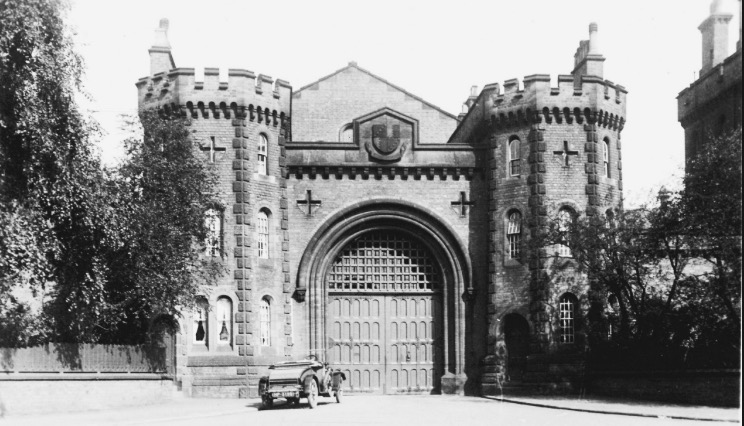
Winson Green Prison in the 1920s

Evaline Hilda Burkitt was born in Wolverhampton in 1876, the fifth of nine children born to Laura née Clews (1843–1909) and Reuben Lancelot Burkitt (1847–1928). The children were well educated, including the girls. Burkitt was interested in reading, needlework and gardening. She lived with her wealthy grandparents Clarissa and Charles Burkitt until she was 25 years old, and then rejoined her family, who had moved to Birmingham. She moved in with her elder sister Christobel, her husband Frederick, and their baby, Kathleen. Hilda Burkitt began work as a secretary living in Sparkbrook in Birmingham and joined the Women's Social and Political Union in 1907 after hearing Nell Kenney and later Emmeline Pankhurst speak. When the Birmingham branch of the WSPU opened in 1908 Burkitt took charge of the publicity campaign in the Midlands. During her militant period she often used the surname "Byron". Another sister, Ida Lillian Burkitt (1872–1962) was an actress, photographer and suffragette, who under her stage name of "Ida Cunard" received a six-week sentence in Holloway Prison for being one of six women who attempted to enter the House of Commons in 1908. Lillian and Christobel were among 50 women arrested on 11 February 1908, following the "Women's Parliament".

Burkitt was arrested four times in 1909, the last occasion being in September when she threw a stone at the window of the Prime Minister H. H. Asquith's train as it pulled out of Birmingham New Street Station after he visited Birmingham to attend an all-male budget meeting at Bingley Hall. Despite a heavy police presence suffragettes had managed to climb onto a nearby roof from where they hurled slates down at him. During court appearances, Burkitt emphasised the political motivation for her actions. On arriving in the prison van at Winson Green Prison to begin their sentences Burkitt, Mabel Capper, Mary Leigh, Charlotte Marsh, Laura Ainsworth, Ellen Barnwell, Leslie Hall and Patricia Woodlock were "singing, shewing defiance, threatened to assault prison authorities, and said they would not go in cells or undress until they were placed in the First Division". All immediately went on hunger strike and were forcibly fed, with Burkitt being the first; she would endure this for a total of 292 times between 1909 and 1914. During her time in prison she spoke out against what she described as inhumane treatment. On her release from Winson Green prison on 18 October 1909 she shouted a defiant "Votes for Women' to a small crowd including reporters. At a reception on 5th November, Burkitt was presented with the WSPU Hunger Strike Medal, "for Valour".

In 1912 she was sentenced to four months imprisonment for window-smashing but was released on medical grounds after going on hunger strike. She was arrested in Leeds in November 1913 charged with Clara Giveen attempting to burn down the grandstand at Leeds Football Ground; she again went on hunger strike and was released from prison in December 1913. Burkitt also organised the Stoke-on-Trent WSPU branch for a few months that year.

== Arson in Suffolk ==
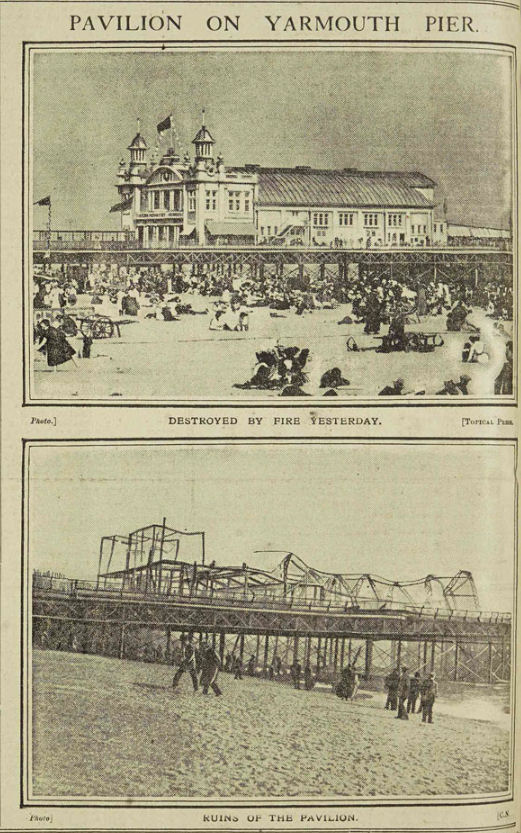
The Pavilion on Britannia Pier in Great Yarmouth before and after the arson attack in 1914

Following her release from Leeds Prison under the Cat and Mouse Act Burkitt managed to evade recapture until in 1914 she and fellow-suffragette Florence Tunks burnt down two wheat stacks at Bucklesham Farm valued at £340, the Pavilion at the Britannia Pier in Great Yarmouth and the Bath Hotel in Felixstowe, causing £36,000 of damage to the latter. There were no occupants in either the Pavilion or the hotel. The two women refused to answer questions in Court and sat on a table chatting throughout the proceedings with their backs to the magistrates.

== Force-feeding ==
On 29 May 1914 Burkitt was sentenced to two years imprisonment in HM Prison Ipswich. She suggested that the judge should put on the black cap and sentence her to death. In prison, she went on hunger strike and thirst strike and was force-fed for the entirety of her remand period before being moved to Holloway Prison. A suffragette released from Holloway at the end of July 1914 stated that Burkitt was being force-fed up to four times a day. She "suffers agonies with her nerves ... She is sick after every feeding ... Her throat is in a terrible condition." Although in good health in prison Burkitt regularly complained of chest pains at night which the prison authorities said were due to indigestion. At the same time her weight loss was recorded which had dropped to 98 lbs by mid-July 1914 – "16 lbs below average weight for her height". It was often recorded that Burkitt was "hysterical" during force-feeding.

On 7 August 1914 Burkitt petitioned the Home Office for release, writing: "I’ve been in prison since April 28th and have been forcibly fed during the whole time, 292 times so far." Burkitt pleaded "reply to my Petition at once, as if I should die through my fasting, my death will lie at your door."and was "ready to lay down my life, to bring about the Freedom of my Sex". She was released from prison on 1 September 1914 after having given a guarantee that she would not again partake of militant activities. She was the last suffragette to be force-fed in Holloway Prison.

== Later years ==
In 1916 she married Leonard Mitchener (1889–1960). The marriage was later dissolved. In 1939 she was living in St Albans as a "Confectioner and Cake Maker". Her family described her as a gentle quiet person, only angry when not permitted a mortgage without a male guarantor.

In her later years she lived with her sister Ida Lillian Burkitt at 48 South Road in Morecambe. Evaline Hilda Mitchener died on 7 March 1955 in Blackburn Royal Infirmary in Lancashire.

== Legacy ==
Hilda Burkitt c.1905: the 2018 artwork was based on this photograph by her sister Ida Lillian Burkitt

In 2014 The Felixstowe Society unveiled a plaque commemorating the burning down of the Bath Hotel in Felixstowe by Burkitt and Florence Tunks in 1914. The plaque commemorates the centenary of the burning down of the hotel and is on what remains of the building, at the site of the former Bartlet Hospital.

From November to December 2018 an art installation of a portrait of Burkitt was placed in Birmingham New Street Station where she had thrown a stone at Asquith's train in 1909. Named "The Face of Suffrage" the artwork was a floor-based 200-metre-square photo mosaic. The artwork was based on a photograph taken by Burkitt's older sister Ida Lillian Burkitt who was a suffragette as well as being an actress, photographer and nurse. Made from 3,724 photographs of women from the West Midlands from the 1900s in addition to pictures of modern women, the artwork was created by artist Helen Marshall of "The People's Picture" to celebrate the centenary of women getting the vote.
