= List of Irish suffragists and suffragettes =

This is a list of Irish suffragists who were born in Ireland or whose lives and works are closely associated with that country.

== Suffragists and suffragettes ==
- Elizabeth Bell (1862–1934) – Belfast’s first female physician, direct-action protester.
- Louie Bennett (1870–1956) – suffragette, trade unionist, writer
- Mary Fleetwood Berry (1865–1956) – suffragist, radical feminist
- Cadiz sisters – Rosie and Lily also known as Jane and Maggie Murphy
- Cissie Cahalan (1876–1948) – trade unionist, feminist, suffragette
- Winifred Carney (1887–1943) – suffragist, trade unionist and Irish independence activist
- Helen Chenevix (1886–1963) – suffragist, trade unionist
- Frances Power Cobbe (1822–1904) – writer, suffragist, animal advocate, women's suffrage campaigner
- Meg Connery (1879–1956) – suffragist organiser and activist
- Margaret "Gretta" Cousins (1878–1954) – Irish-Indian, established All India Women's Conference, co-founded Irish Women's Franchise League
- Mabel Sharman Crawford (1820–1912) – Irish adventurer, feminist and writer
- Charlotte Despard (1844–1939) – Anglo-Irish suffragist, socialist, pacifist, Sinn Féin activist, and novelist
- Margaret Dockrell (1849–1926) – suffragist, philanthropist, councillor
- Marion Duggan (1884–1943) – Irish suffragist and activist
- Norah Elam (1878–1961) – Irish-born British suffragette and fascist
- Dr. Maude Glasgow (1876–1955) – early pioneer in public health and preventive medicine as well as an activist for equal rights
- Maud Gonne (1866–1953) – British-born Irish revolutionary, suffragette and actress
- Eva Gore-Booth (1870–1926) – poet, dramatist, suffragette, labour activist
- Anna Haslam (1829–1922) – founder of the Dublin Women's Suffrage Association
- Marjorie Hasler (c. 1887 – 1913) – suffragette, "first martyr"
- Mary Hayden (1862–1942) – suffragist, women's rights activist
- Rosamond Jacob (1888–1960) – writer, suffragist, republican activist
- Marie Johnson (1874–1974) – Irish trade unionist, suffragist and teacher
- Laura Geraldine Lennox (1883–1958) – suffragette and war volunteer in Paris
- Isa Macnie (1869–1958) – croquet champion, cartoonist, suffragist and activist
- Mary MacSwiney (1872–1942) – suffragist, politician, educationalist
- Margaret McCoubrey (1880–1955) – Scottish-born Irish suffragist, co-operative movement activist
- Elizabeth McCracken (1871–1944) – feminist writer, refused wartime suspension of suffragist struggle.
- Lillian Metge (1871–1954), "Lisburn bomber": direct action suffragette
- Constance Markievicz (1868–1927) – politician, revolutionary, suffragette
- Florence Moon (fl. 1914) – suffragist, member of the Women's National Health Association
- Marguerite Moore (1849–1933) – nationalist activist, suffragist, "first suffragette"
- Alicia Adelaide Needham (1863–1945) – song composer, suffragette
- Kathleen Cruise O'Brien (1886–1938) – suffragist, Irish language advocate, teacher
- May O'Callaghan (1881–1973) – suffragette, communist
- Mary Donovan O'Sullivan (1887–1966) – history professor, suffragist
- Alice Oldham (1850–1907) – education campaigner, academic, suffragist
- Sarah Persse (fl. 1899) – suffragist
- Anne Isabella Robertson (c. 1830 – 1910) – writer and suffragist
- Hanna Sheehy-Skeffington (1877–1946) – founder-member of the Irish Women's Franchise League
- Margaret Skinnider (1892–1971) – Scottish-born Irish revolutionary, feminist, suffragist
- Isabella Tod (1836–1896) – Scottish-born Irish unionist, helped secure women the municipal vote in Belfast.
- Catherine Winter (campaigner) (died 1870) – Irish publicist, suffragist and campaigner
- Jennie Wyse Power (1858–1941) – feminist, politician, suffragist
- Edith Young (1882–1974) – Irish suffragist organiser and activist

== See also ==
- List of suffragists and suffragettes
- Timeline of women's suffrage
