= Suffragette =

British movement for women's suffrage

- Annie Kenney and Christabel Pankhurst of the WSPU in 1906
- Named after: Suffragist
- Formation: 10 October 1903; 123 years ago
- Founder: Emmeline Pankhurst (WSPU)
- Purpose: Votes for women
- Methods: Marches, heckling, civil disobedience, direct action, hunger strike, terrorism (see suffragette bombing and arson campaign)
- First suffragettes: Women's Social and Political Union
- Later groups: Women's Freedom League (founded 1907); East London Federation of Suffragettes (founded 1914)
- Key people: Emmeline Pankhurst, Christabel Pankhurst, Sylvia Pankhurst, Teresa Billington-Greig, Emily Davison, Charlotte Despard, Flora Drummond, Annie Kenney, Constance Lytton, Emmeline Pethick-Lawrence, Evaline Hilda Burkitt, Mary Richardson, Lilian Lenton

A suffragette was a member or supporter of the British Women's Social and Political Union (WSPU), an activist women's group agitating for votes for women, which in the early 20th century broke away from the much larger, peaceful and longer lasting National Union of Women's Suffrage Societies (NUWSS), whose supporters were known as suffragists. Both organisations campaigned for the right to vote in public elections in the United Kingdom. However, the Women's Social and Political Union, a women-only movement founded in 1903 by Emmeline Pankhurst, engaged in direct action and civil disobedience as a result of what they saw as slow progress towards universal suffrage. In 1906, a journalist writing in the Daily Mail coined the term suffragette for the WSPU, derived from suffragist^{α} (any person advocating for voting rights), reportedly to 'indicate that special revolutionary quality of impatience which marked the new variety of suffragist', although Elizabeth Crawford, a researcher and author on the women's suffrage movement, has suggested it was to 'belittle and to show that they were less than the proper kind of suffrage worker'. Whatever the truth was, the militants embraced the new name, even adopting it for use as the title of the newspaper published by the WSPU.

Flag of the Women's Social and Political Union. Purple represents loyalty and dignity, white represents purity, and green represents hope.

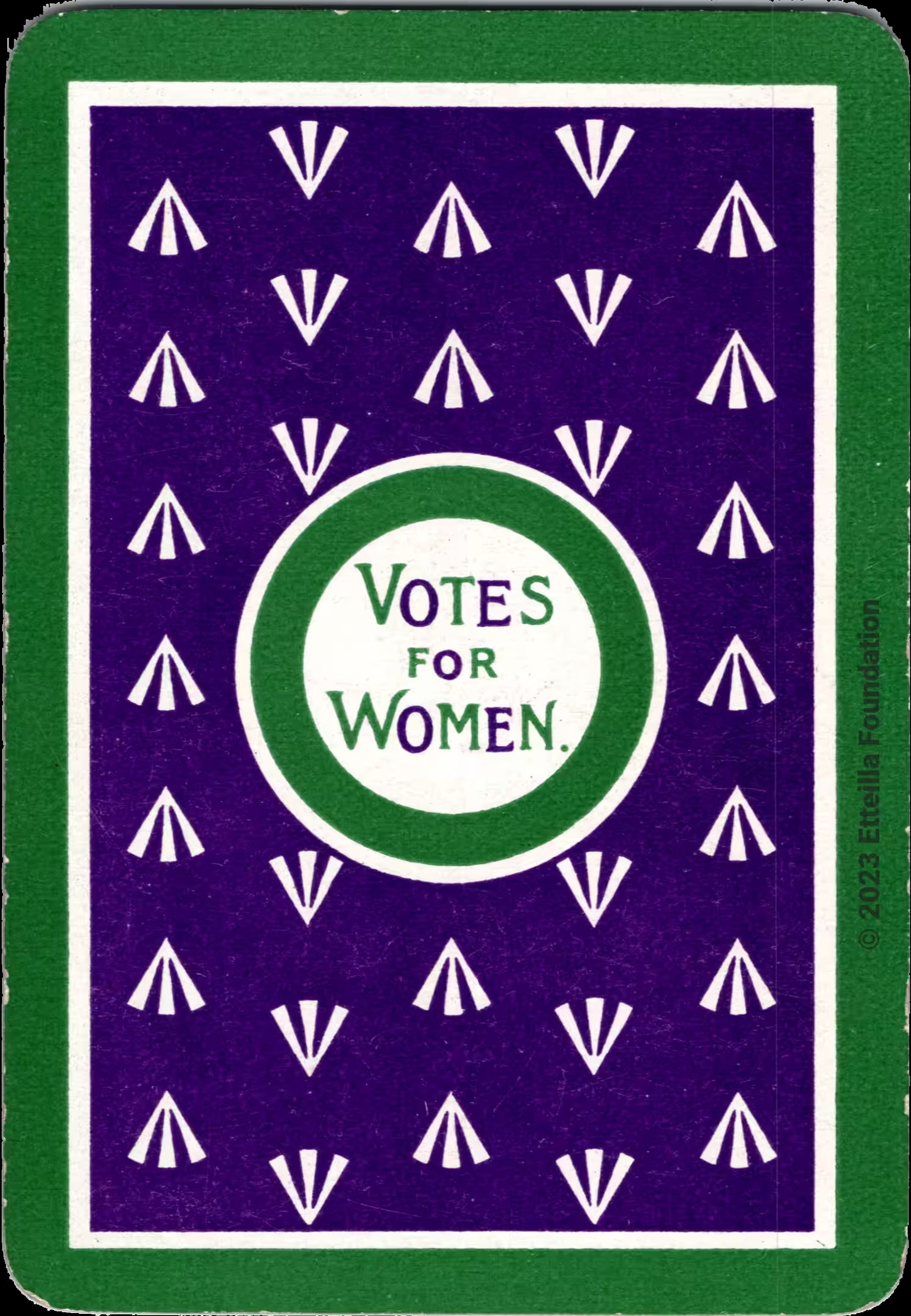
De La Rue playing cards back from 1910

Women had won the right to vote in several countries by the end of the 19th century; in 1893, New Zealand became the first self-governing country to grant the vote to all women over the age of 21. When by 1903 women in Britain had not been enfranchised, Pankhurst decided that women had to "do the work ourselves"; the WSPU motto became "deeds, not words". The suffragettes heckled, attacked and injured politicians, tried to storm parliament, chained themselves to railings, smashed windows, and carried out a nationwide bombing and arson campaign. In turn they were attacked, and sometimes sexually assaulted, during battles with the police. Suffragettes faced anger from large parts of the British public, and ridicule in the media. When imprisoned they went on hunger strike, not eating for days or even a week, to which the government responded by force-feeding them. The first suffragette to be force fed was Evaline Hilda Burkitt. The death of one suffragette, Emily Wilding Davison, made headlines around the world when she ran in front of King George V's horse at the 1913 Epsom Derby along with 17 other women. The WSPU campaign had varying levels of support from within the suffragette movement; breakaway groups formed, and within the WSPU itself not all members supported the direct action.

The suffragette campaign was suspended when World War I broke out in 1914, when the WSPU ceased all agitation for women's suffrage and supported the White Feather Campaign but the work of the NUWSS continued and immediately after the war, the Representation of the People Act 1918 gave the vote to some women, but because so many men had died in the war, and to avoid an immediate female voting majority, it was initially only for women over the age of 30 who met certain property qualifications. Ten years later, women gained electoral equality with men when the Representation of the People (Equal Franchise) Act 1928 gave all women the right to vote at age 21.

== Background ==
=== Women's suffrage ===
Although the Isle of Man (a British Crown dependency) had enfranchised women who owned property to vote in parliamentary (Tynwald) elections in 1881, New Zealand was the first self-governing country to grant all women the right to vote in 1893, when women over the age of 21 were permitted to vote in all parliamentary elections. Women in South Australia achieved the same right and became the first to obtain the right to stand for parliament in 1895. In the United States, women over the age of 21 were allowed to vote in the western territories of Wyoming from 1869 and Utah from 1870, as well as in the states of Colorado and Idaho from 1893 and 1896 respectively.

=== Earlier British suffragists ===
In 1865 John Stuart Mill was elected to Parliament on a platform that included votes for women, and in 1869 he published his essay in favour of equality of the sexes The Subjection of Women. Also in 1865, a women's discussion group, The Kensington Society, was formed. Following discussions on the subject of women's suffrage, the society formed a committee to draft a petition and gather signatures, which Mill agreed to present to Parliament once they had gathered 100 signatures. In October 1866, amateur scientist Lydia Becker attended a meeting of the National Association for the Promotion of Social Science held in Manchester and heard one of the organisors of the petition, Barbara Bodichon, read a paper entitled Reasons for the Enfranchisement of Women. Becker was inspired to help gather signatures around Manchester and to join the newly formed Manchester committee. Mill presented the petition to Parliament in 1866, by which time the supporters had gathered 1499 signatures, including those of Florence Nightingale, Harriet Martineau, Josephine Butler and Mary Somerville.

In March 1867, Becker wrote an article for the Contemporary Review, in which she said:

"It surely will not be denied that women have, and ought to have, opinions of their own on subjects of public interest, and on the events which arise as the world wends on its way. But if it be granted that women may, without offence, hold political opinions, on what ground can the right be withheld of giving the same expression or effect to their opinions as that enjoyed by their male neighbours?"

Two further petitions were presented to parliament in May 1867 and Mill also proposed an amendment to the 1867 Reform Act to give women the same political rights as men, but the amendment was treated with derision and defeated by 196 votes to 73.

The Manchester Society for Women's suffrage was formed in January 1867, when Jacob Bright, Rev. S. A. Steinthal, Mrs. Gloyne, Max Kyllman and Elizabeth Wolstenholme met at the house of Louis Borchardt. Lydia Becker was made Secretary of the Society in February 1867 and Richard Pankhurst was one of the earliest members of the executive committee. An 1874 speaking event in Manchester organised by Becker, was attended by 14-year-old Emmeline Goulden, who was to become an ardent campaigner for women's rights, and later married Pankhurst becoming known as Emmeline Pankhurst.

During the summer of 1880, Becker visited the Isle of Man to address five public meetings on the subject of women's suffrage to audiences mainly composed of women. These speeches instilled in the Manx women a determination to secure the franchise, and on 31 January 1881, women on the island who owned property in their own right were given the vote.

=== Formation of the WSPU ===
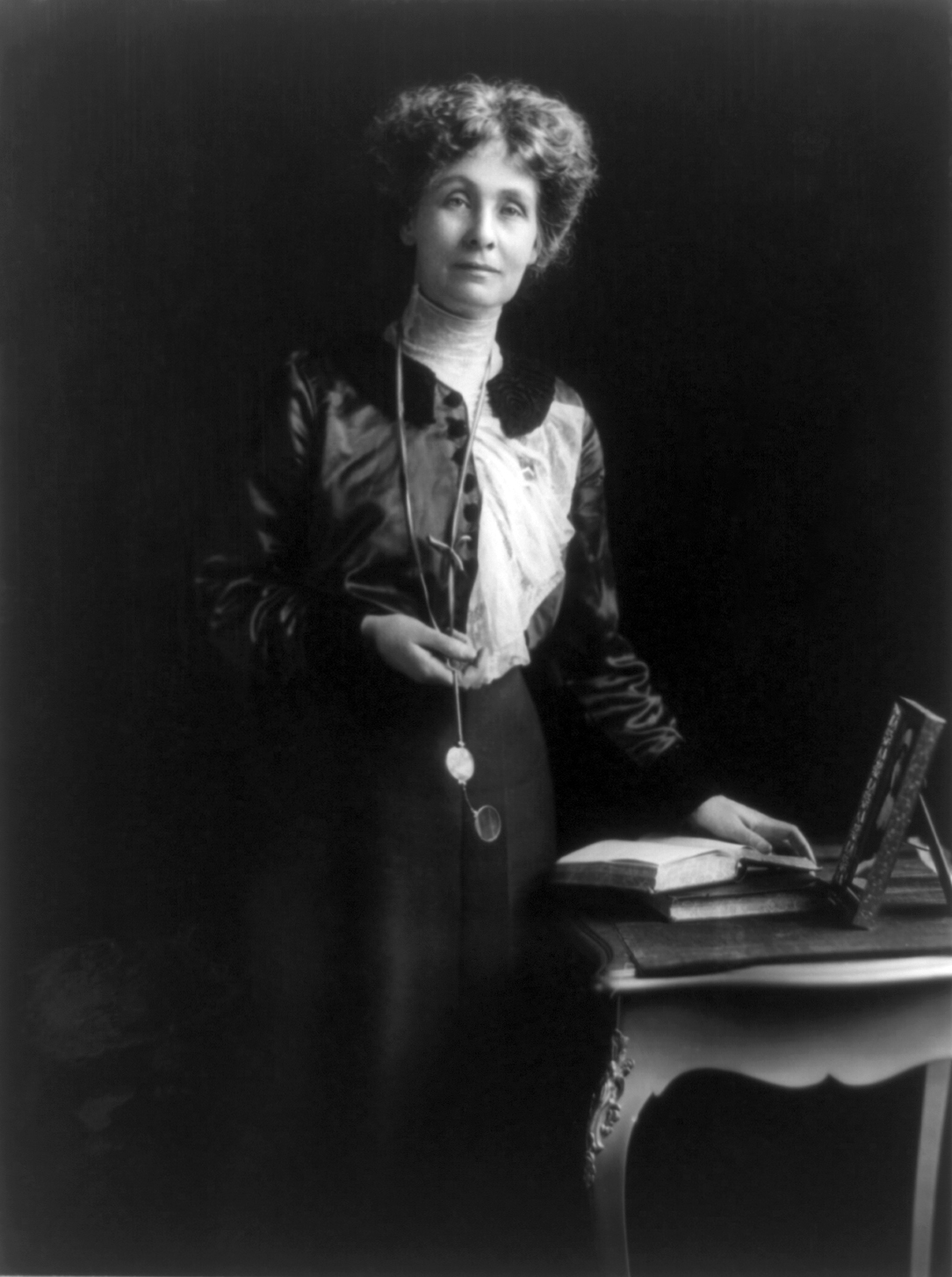
Emmeline Pankhurst founded the WSPU in 1903 and became the most prominent of Britain's suffragettes.

In Manchester, the Women's Suffrage Committee had been formed in 1867 to work with the Independent Labour Party (ILP) to secure votes for women, but, although the local ILP were very supportive, nationally the party were more interested in securing the franchise for working-class men and refused to make women's suffrage a priority. In 1897, the Manchester Women's Suffrage committee had merged with the National Union of Women's Suffrage Societies (NUWSS) but Emmeline Pankhurst, who was a member of the original Manchester committee, and her eldest daughter Christabel had become impatient with the ILP, and on 10 October 1903, Emmeline Pankhurst held a meeting at her home in Manchester to form a breakaway group, the Women's Social and Political Union (WSPU). From the outset, the WSPU was determined to move away from what they saw as the staid campaign methods of NUWSS and instead take more positive action:

It was on October 10, 1903 that I invited a number of women to my house in Nelson Street, Manchester, for purposes of organisation. We voted to call our new society the Women's Social and Political Union, partly to emphasise its democracy, and partly to define its object as political rather than propagandist. We resolved to limit our membership exclusively to women, to keep ourselves absolutely free from party affiliation, and to be satisfied with nothing but action on our question. 'Deeds, not words' was to be our permanent motto.

— Emmeline Pankhurst

=== Charles E. Hands ===
The term "suffragette" was first used in 1906 by the journalist Charles E. Hands in the London Daily Mail to describe militant activists in the movement for women's suffrage, in particular members of the WSPU. The WSPU embraced the term, saying "suffraGETtes" (hardening the 'g'), implying not only that they wanted the vote, but that they intended to 'get' it. The non-militant suffragists found favour in the press, as they were not hoping to get the franchise through 'violence, crime, arson and open rebellion'.

In a letter written to THE NEW YORK TIMES in 1931 an informant who used merely the initials "M. G. S.," credited Charles Hands with coining the word "suffragette." The letter said: "It was Charles Hands, always friendly to the early suffragettes, who first used the word to indicate that special revolutionary quality of impatience which marked the new variety of suffragist. The Pankhurst party proudly adopted the word, which I have heard defined from their platforms like this: The suffragist just wants a vote, but the suffragette is going to get it. A bit far-fetched that, as the word was pronounced with a soft "g"; but the application always succeeded with the crowds and drove the lesson home."

== WSPU campaigns ==
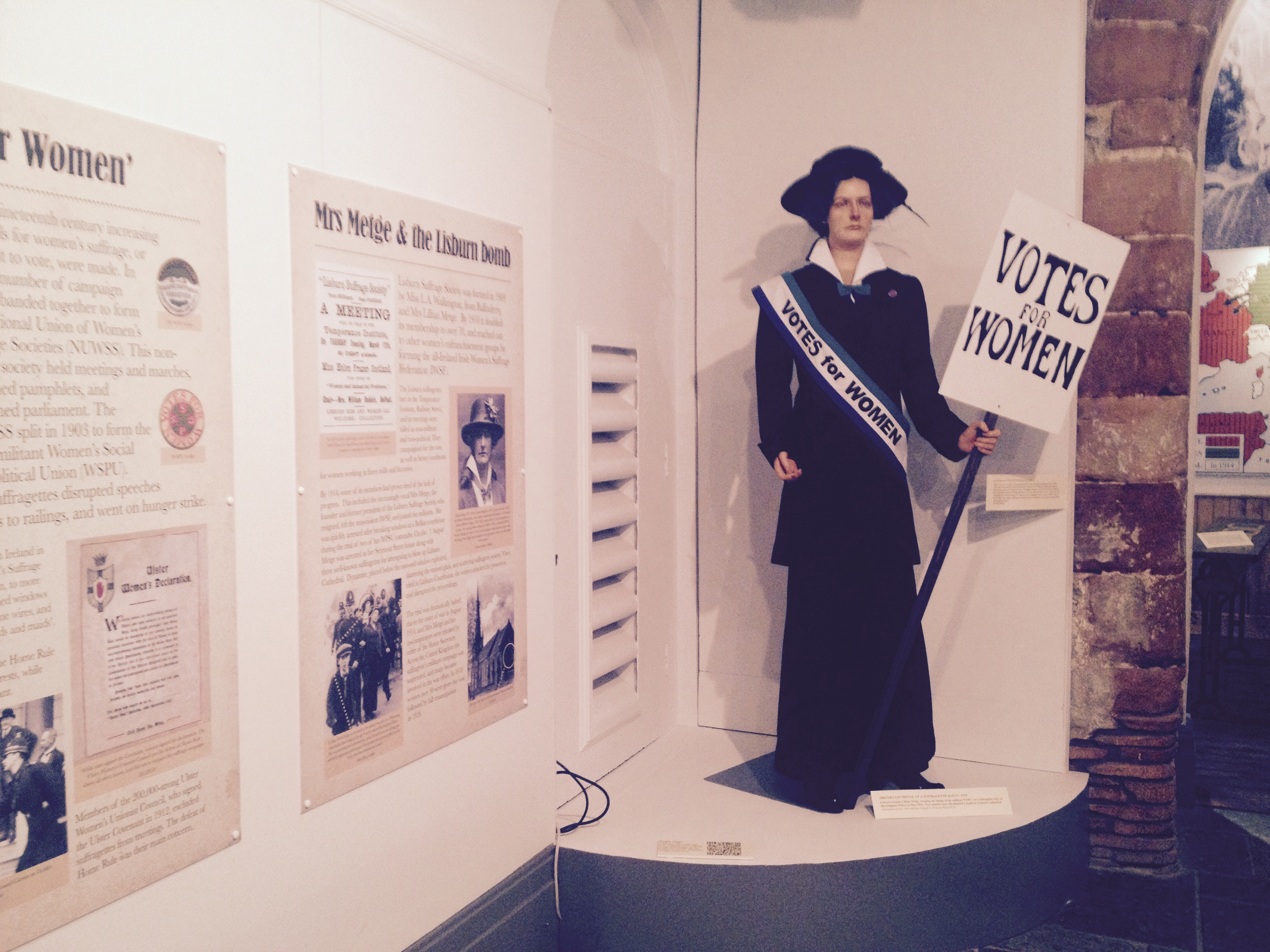
Mannequin of Lilian Metge

At a political meeting in Manchester in 1905, Christabel Pankhurst and millworker, Annie Kenney, disrupted speeches by prominent Liberals Winston Churchill and Sir Edward Grey, asking where Churchill and Grey stood with regards to women's political rights. At a time when political meetings were only attended by men and speakers were expected to be given the courtesy of expounding their views without interruption, the audience were outraged, and when the women unfurled a "Votes for Women" banner they were both arrested for a technical assault on a policeman. When Pankhurst and Kenney appeared in court they both refused to pay the fine imposed, preferring to go to prison to gain publicity for their cause.

In July 1908 the WSPU hosted a large demonstration in Heaton Park, near Manchester with speakers on 13 separate platforms including Emmeline, Christabel and Adela Pankhurst. According to the Manchester Guardian:

Friends of the women suffrage movement are entitled to reckon the great demonstration at Heaton Park yesterday, arranged by the Women's Social and Political Union, as somewhat of a triumph. With fine weather as an ally the women suffragists were able to bring together an immense body of people. These people were not all sympathisers with the object, and much service to the cause must have been rendered by merely collecting so many people and talking over the subject with them. The organisation, too, was creditable to the promoters...The police were few and inconspicuous. The speakers went by special [tram]car to the Bury Old Road entrance, and were escorted by a few police to several platforms. Here the escorts waited till the speaking was over, and then accompanied their respective charges back to the special car. There was little need, apparently, for the escort. Even the opponents of the suffrage claim who made themselves heard were perfectly friendly towards the speakers, and the only crowding about them as they left was that of curiosity on the part of those who wished to have a good look at the missioners in the cause.

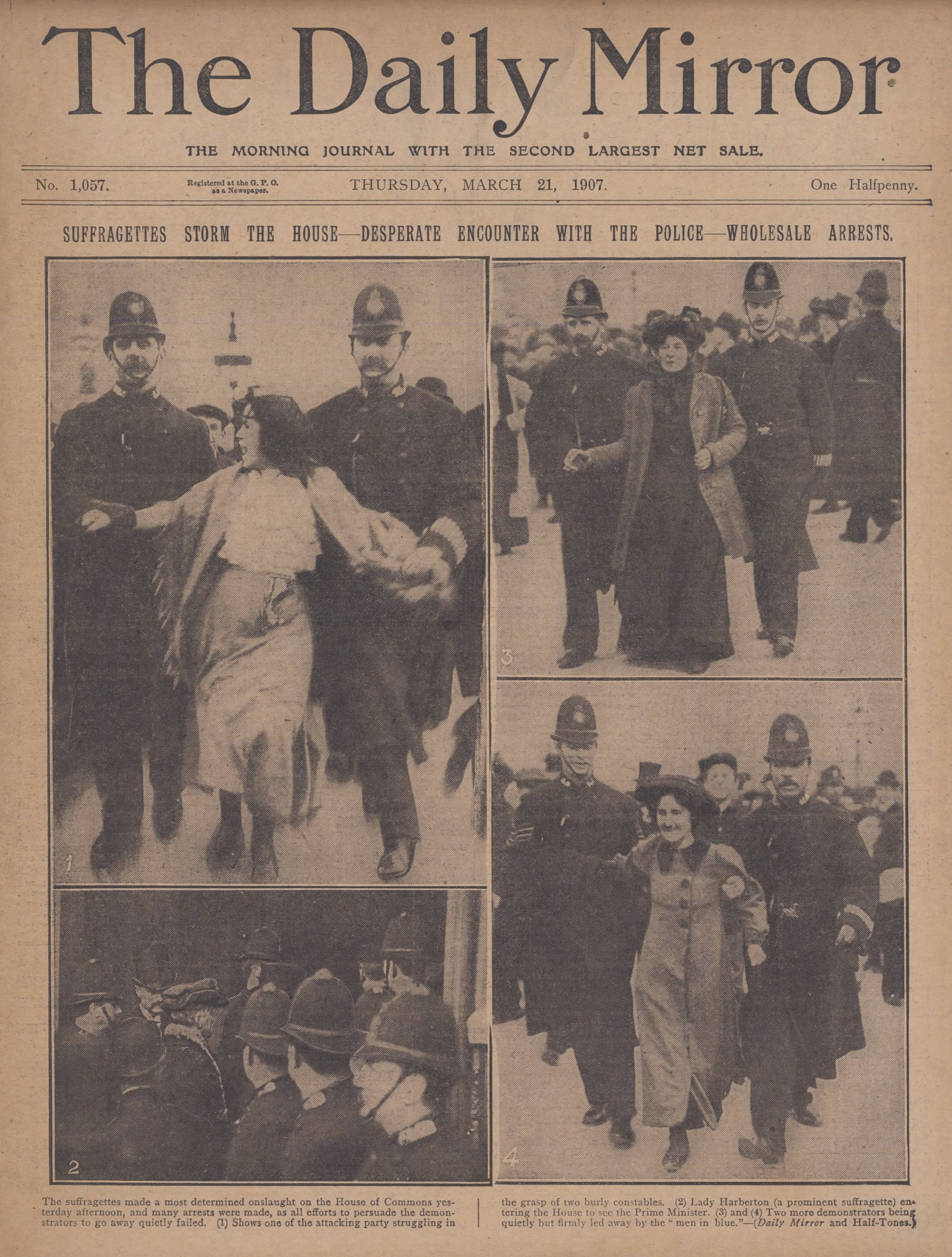
Frontpage of the Daily Mirror, 21 March 1907

Stung by the stereotypical image of the strong minded woman in masculine clothes created by newspaper cartoonists, the suffragettes resolved to present a fashionable, feminine image when appearing in public. In 1908, the co-editor of the WSPU's Votes for Women newspaper, Emmeline Pethick-Lawrence, designed the suffragettes' colour scheme of purple for loyalty and dignity, white for purity, and green for hope. Fashionable London shops Selfridges and Liberty sold tricolour-striped ribbon for hats, rosettes, badges and belts, as well as coloured garments, underwear, handbags, shoes, slippers and toilet soap. As membership of the WSPU grew it became fashionable for women to identify with the cause by wearing the colours, often discreetly in a small piece of jewellery or by carrying a heart-shaped vesta case and in December 1908 the London jewellers, Mappin & Webb, issued a catalogue of suffragette jewellery in time for the Christmas season. Sylvia Pankhurst said at the time: "Many suffragists spend more money on clothes than they can comfortably afford, rather than run the risk of being considered outré, and doing harm to the cause". In 1909 the WSPU presented specially commissioned pieces of jewellery to leading suffragettes, Emmeline Pankhurst and Louise Eates.

The suffragettes also used other methods to publicise and raise money for the cause and from 1909, the "Pank-a-Squith" board game was sold by the WSPU. The name was derived from Pankhurst and the surname of Prime Minister H. H. Asquith, who was largely hated by the movement. The board game was set out in a spiral, and players were required to lead their suffragette figure from their home to parliament, past the obstacles faced from Prime Minister H. H. Asquith and the Liberal government. Also in 1909, suffragettes Daisy Solomon and Elspeth McClelland tried an innovative method of potentially obtaining a meeting with Asquith by sending themselves by Royal Mail courier post; however, Downing Street did not accept the parcel.

In 1911 suffragette organisations urged women and supporters of women's enfranchisement to boycott the 1911 census. Some wrote "Votes for Women" or other slogans on their census returns and others evaded the census by hiding overnight. Most famously, Emily Wilding Davison hid in the House of Commons overnight so that she could be enumerated in Parliament.

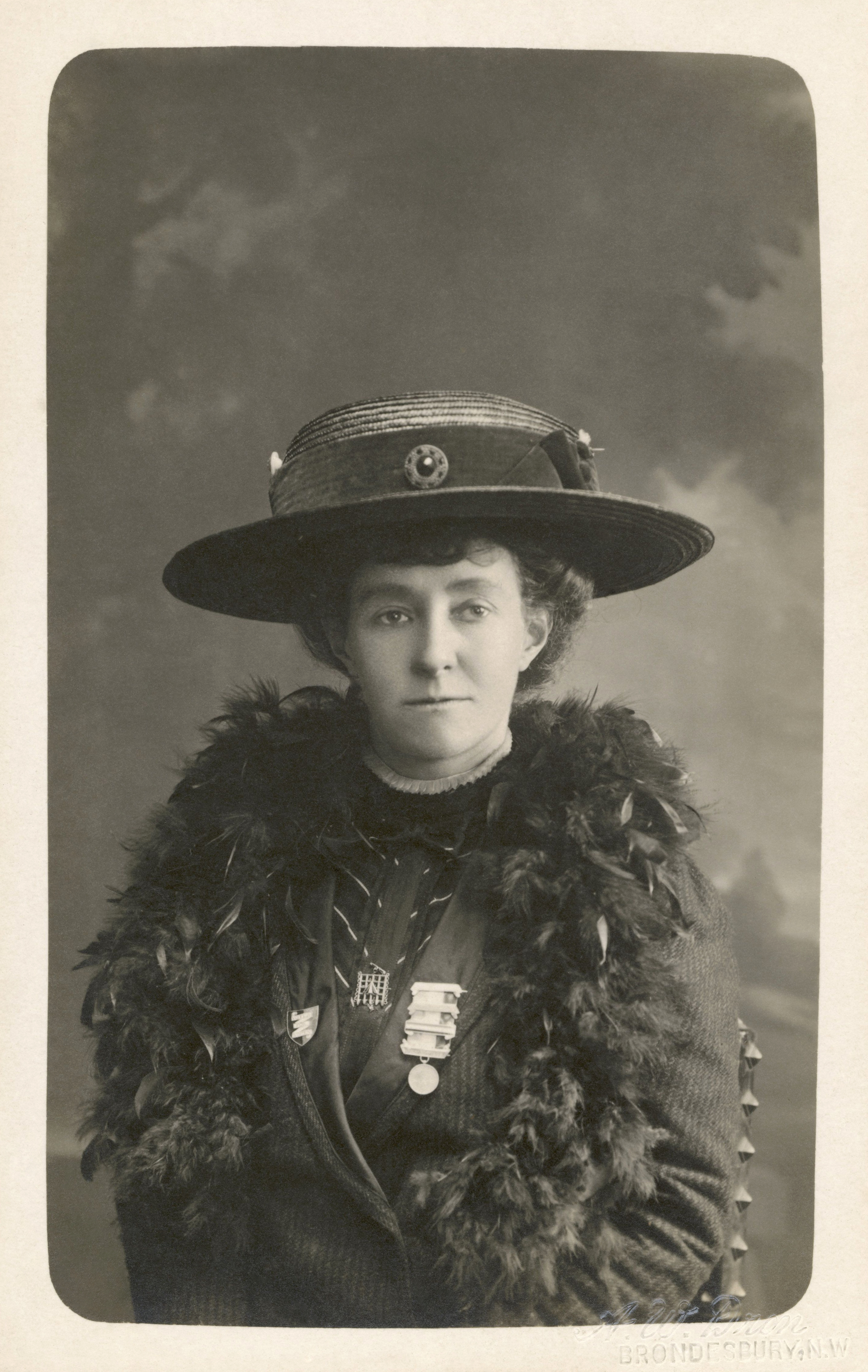
Emily Davison became known in the WSPU for her daring militant action.

1912 was a turning point for the suffragettes, as they turned to using more militant tactics and began a window-smashing campaign. Some members of the WSPU, including Emmeline Pethick-Lawrence and her husband Frederick, disagreed with this strategy but Christabel Pankhurst ignored their objections. In response to this, the Government ordered the arrest of the WSPU leaders and, although Christabel Pankhurst escaped to France, the Pethick-Lawrences were arrested, tried and sentenced to nine months' imprisonment. On their release, the Pethick-Lawrences began to speak out publicly against the window-smashing campaign, arguing that it would lose support for the cause, and eventually they were expelled from the WSPU. Having lost control of Votes for Women the WSPU began to publish their own newspaper under the title The Suffragette.

The campaign was then escalated, with the suffragettes chaining themselves to railings, setting fire to post box contents, smashing windows and eventually detonating bombs, as part of a wider bombing campaign. Some radical techniques used by the suffragettes were learned from Russian exiles from tsarism who had escaped to England. In 1914, at least seven churches were bombed or set on fire across the United Kingdom, including Westminster Abbey, where an explosion aimed at destroying the 700-year-old Coronation Chair, only caused minor damage. Places that wealthy people, typically men, frequented were also burnt and destroyed whilst left unattended so that there was little risk to life, including cricket pavilions, horse-racing pavilions, churches, castles and the second homes of the wealthy. They also burnt the slogan "Votes for Women" into the grass of golf courses. Pinfold Manor in Surrey, which was being built for the Chancellor of the Exchequer, David Lloyd George, was targeted with two bombs on 19 February 1913, only one of which exploded, causing significant damage; in her memoirs, Sylvia Pankhurst said that Emily Davison had carried out the attack. There were 250 arson or destruction attacks in a six-month period in 1913 and in April the newspapers reported "What might have been the most serious outrage yet perpetrated by the Suffragettes":

Policemen discovered inside the railings of the Bank of England a bomb timed to explode at midnight. It contained 3oz of powerful explosive, some metal, and a number of hairpins – the last named constituent no doubt to make known the source of the intended sensation. The bomb was similar to that used in the attempt to blow up Oxted Railway Station. It contained a watch with attachment for explosion, but was clumsily fitted. If it had exploded when the streets were crowded a number of people would probably have been injured.

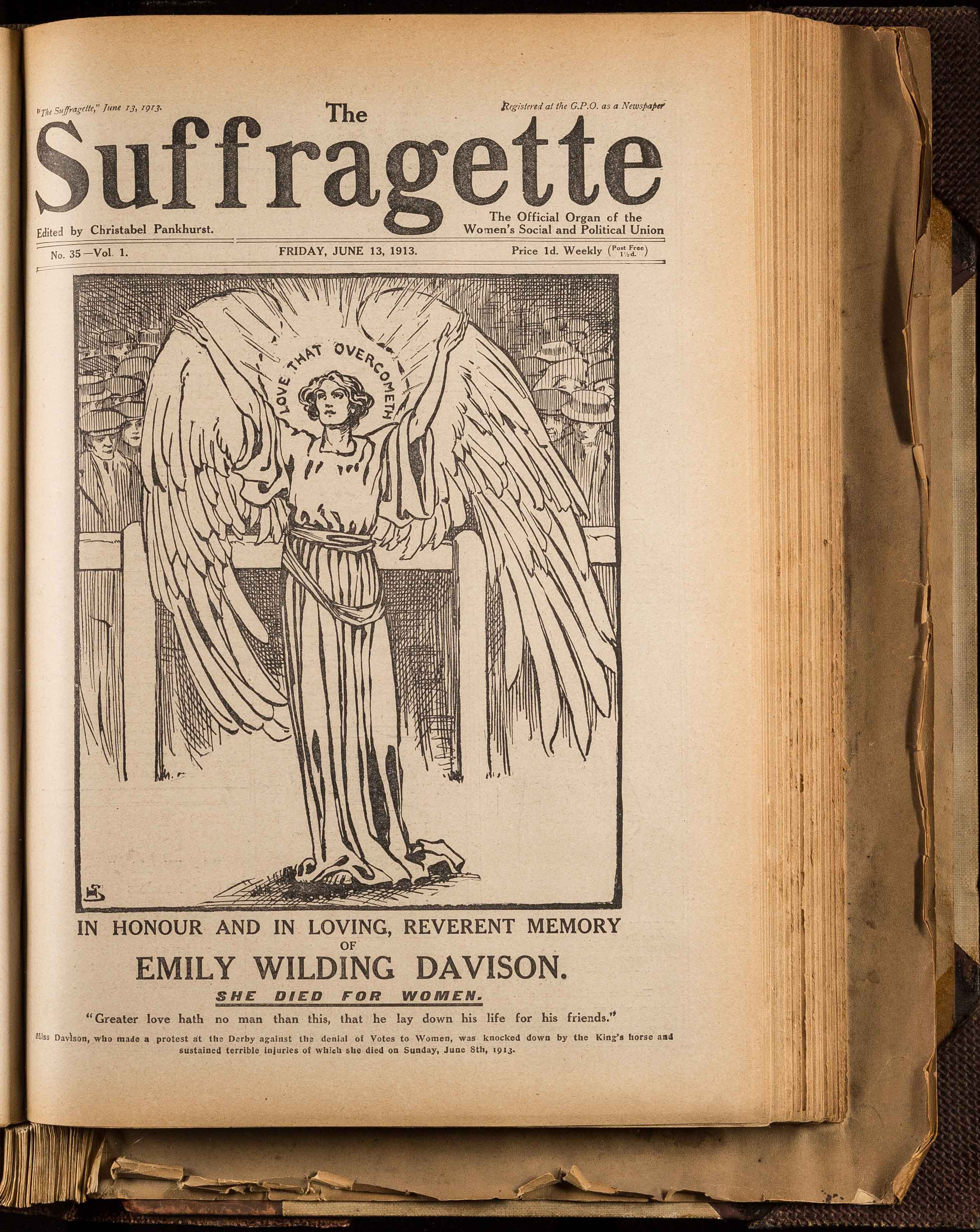
The Suffragette newspaper edited by Christabel Pankhurst, Emily Davison memorial issue, 13 June 1913

There are reports in the Parliamentary Papers which include lists of the 'incendiary devices', explosions, artwork destruction (including an axe attack upon a painting of The Duke of Wellington in the National Gallery), arson attacks, window-breaking, postbox burning and telegraph cable cutting, that took place during the most militant years, from 1910 to 1914. Both suffragettes and police spoke of a "Reign of Terror"; newspaper headlines referred to "Suffragette Terrorism".

One suffragette, Emily Davison, died under the King's horse, Anmer, at The Derby on 4 June 1913. It is debated whether she was trying to pull down the horse, attach a suffragette scarf or banner to it, or commit suicide to become a martyr to the cause. However, recent analysis of the film of the event suggests that she was merely trying to attach a scarf to the horse, and the suicide theory seems unlikely as she was carrying a return train ticket from Epsom and had holiday plans with her sister in the near future.

=== Imprisonment ===
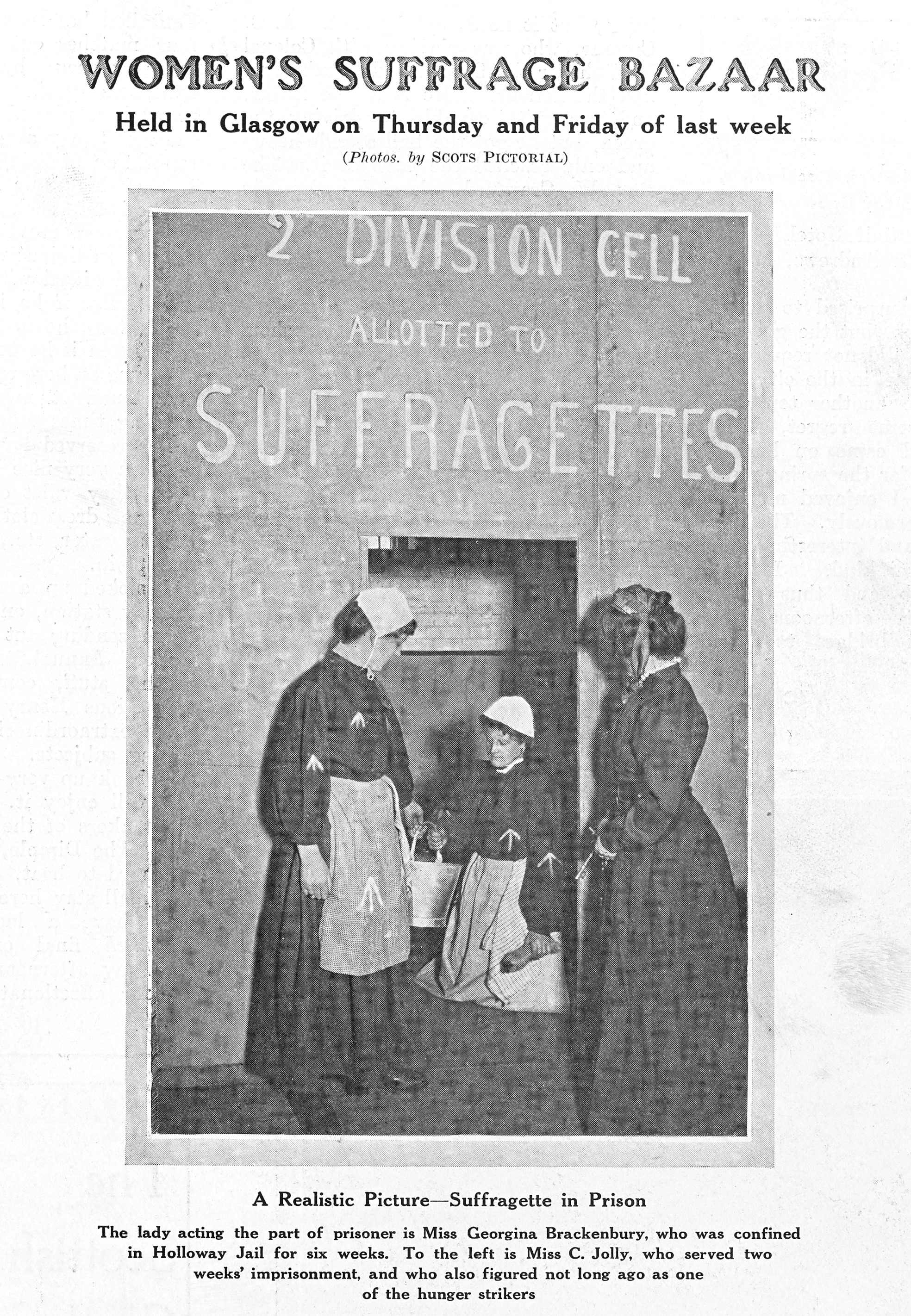
Photograph of three women in a prison uniform.

In the early 20th century until the outbreak of World War I, approximately one thousand suffragettes were imprisoned in Britain. Most early incarcerations were for public order offences and failure to pay outstanding fines. While incarcerated, suffragettes lobbied to be considered political prisoners; with such a designation, suffragettes would be placed in the First Division as opposed to the Second or Third Division of the prison system, and as political prisoners would be granted certain freedoms and liberties not allotted to other prison divisions, such as being allowed frequent visits and being allowed to write books or articles. Because of a lack of consistency between the different courts, suffragettes would not necessarily be placed in the First Division and could be placed in the Second or Third Division, which enjoyed fewer liberties.

This cause was taken up by the Women's Social and Political Union (WSPU), a large organisation in Britain, that lobbied for women's suffrage led by militant suffragette Emmeline Pankhurst. The WSPU campaigned to get imprisoned suffragettes recognised as political prisoners. However, this campaign was largely unsuccessful. Citing a fear that the suffragettes becoming political prisoners would make for easy martyrdom, and with thoughts from the courts and the Home Office that they were abusing the freedoms of the First Division to further the agenda of the WSPU, suffragettes were placed in the Second Division, and in some cases the Third Division, in prisons, with no special privileges granted to them as a result.

=== Hunger strikes and force-feeding ===
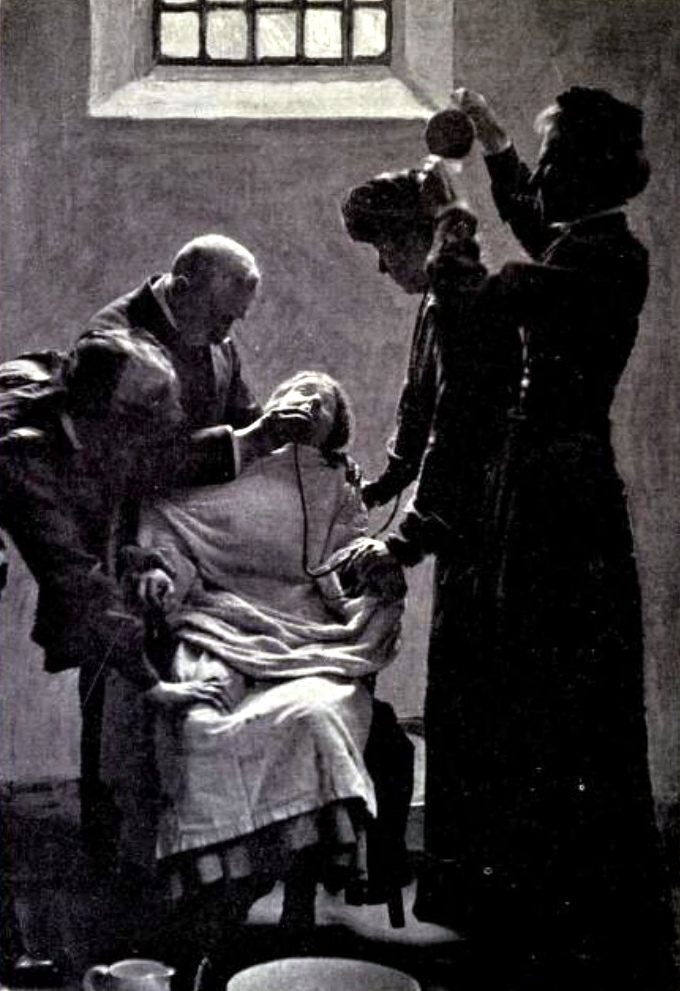
Suffragette being force-fed

Suffragettes were not recognised as political prisoners, and many of them staged hunger strikes while they were imprisoned. The first woman to refuse food was Marion Wallace Dunlop, a militant suffragette who was sentenced to a month in Holloway for vandalism in July 1909. Without consulting suffragette leaders such as Pankhurst, Dunlop refused food in protest at being denied political prisoner status. After a 92-hour hunger strike, and for fear of her becoming a martyr, the Home Secretary Herbert Gladstone decided to release her early on medical grounds. Dunlop's strategy was adopted by other suffragettes who were incarcerated. It became common practice for suffragettes to refuse food in protest for not being designated as political prisoners, and as a result they would be released after a few days and could return to the "fighting line".

After a public backlash regarding the prison status of suffragettes, the rules of the divisions were amended. In March 1910, Rule 243A was introduced by the Home Secretary Winston Churchill, allowing prisoners in the Second and Third Divisions to be allowed certain privileges of the First Division, provided they were not convicted of a serious offence, effectively ending hunger strikes for two years. Hunger strikes began again when Pankhurst was transferred from the Second Division to the First Division, inciting the other suffragettes to demonstrate regarding their prison status.

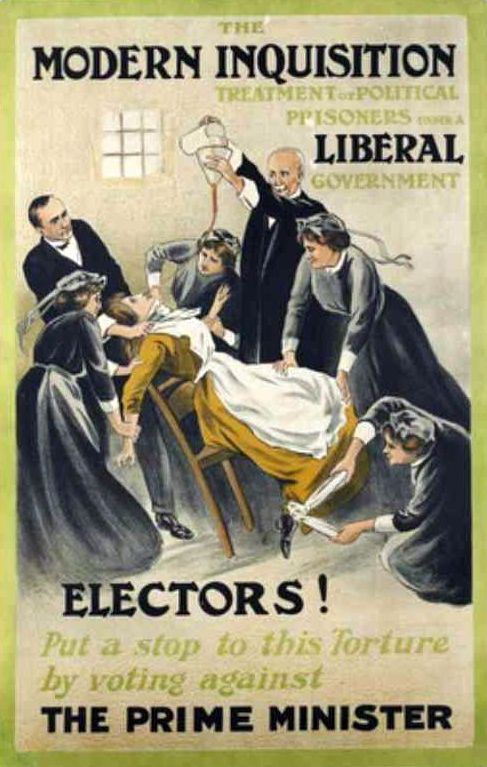
A 1910 poster by Alfred Pearce for the WSPU showing a suffragette being force-fed

Militant suffragette demonstrations subsequently became more aggressive, and the British Government took action. Unwilling to release all the suffragettes refusing food in prison, in the autumn of 1909, the authorities began to adopt more drastic measures to manage the hunger-strikers. In September 1909, the Home Office became unwilling to release hunger-striking suffragettes before their sentence was served. Suffragettes became a liability because, if they were to die in custody, the prison would be responsible for their death. Prisons began the practice of force-feeding the hunger strikers through a tube, most commonly via a nostril or stomach tube or a stomach pump. Force-feeding had previously been practised in Britain but its use had been exclusively for patients in hospitals who were too unwell to eat or swallow food. Despite the practice being deemed safe by medical practitioners for sick patients, it posed health issues for the healthy suffragettes.

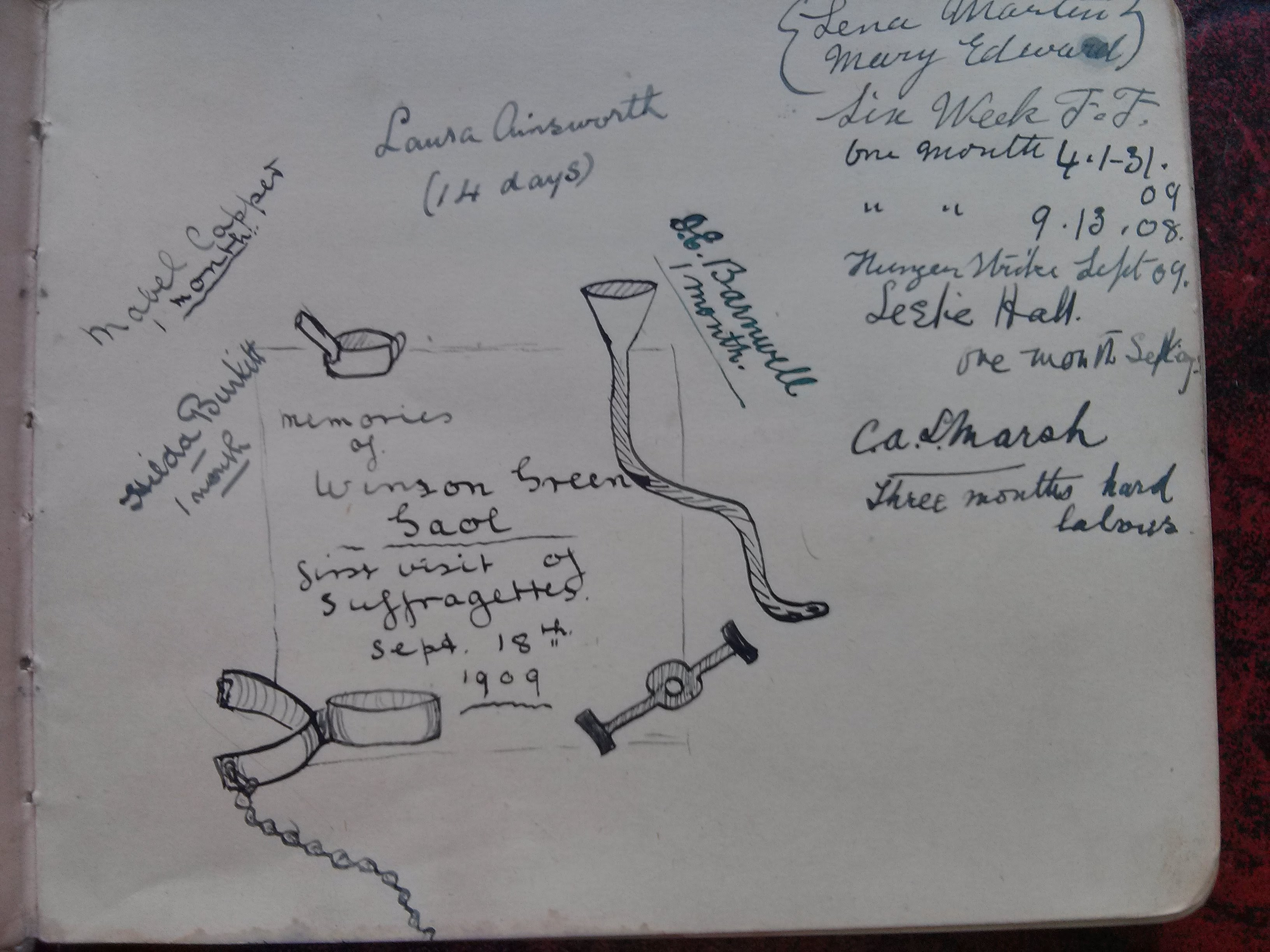
Memories of Winson Green Gaol, 18 September 1909; illustration from Mabel Capper's WSPU prisoner's scrapbook

The process of tube-feeding was strenuous without the consent of the hunger strikers, who were typically strapped down and force-fed via stomach or nostril tube, often with a considerable amount of force. The process was painful, and after the practice was observed and studied by several physicians, it was deemed to cause both short-term damage to the circulatory system, digestive system and nervous system and long-term damage to the physical and mental health of the suffragettes. The first suffragette to be forcibly-fed was Evaline Hilda Burkitt, who, between 1909 and 1914 was force-fed 292 times. Mary Richardson was recognised as the second suffragette to be force fed while imprisoned, describing her experience as "torture" and an "immoral assault." Some suffragettes who were force-fed developed pleurisy or pneumonia as a result of a misplaced tube. Women who had gone on hunger strike in prison received a Hunger Strike Medal from the WSPU on their release.

=== Legislation ===
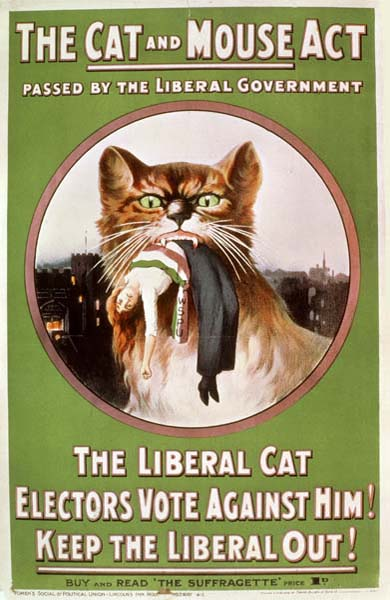
Cat and Mouse Act WSPU poster (1914)

In April 1913, Reginald McKenna of the Home Office passed the Prisoners (Temporary Discharge for Ill Health) Act 1913, or the Cat and Mouse Act as it was commonly known. The act made the hunger strikes legal, in that a suffragette would be temporarily released from prison when their health began to diminish, only to be readmitted when she regained her health to finish her sentence. The act enabled the British Government to be absolved of any blame resulting from death or harm due to the self-starvation of the striker and ensured that the suffragettes would be too ill and too weak to participate in demonstrative activities while not in custody. Most women continued hunger striking when they were readmitted to prison following their leave. After the Act was introduced, force-feeding on a large scale was stopped and only women convicted of more serious crimes and considered likely to repeat their offences if released were force-fed.

=== The Bodyguard ===
In early 1913 and in response to the Cat and Mouse Act, the WSPU instituted a secret society of women known as the "Bodyguard" whose role was to physically protect Emmeline Pankhurst and other prominent suffragettes from arrest and assault. Known members included Katherine Willoughby Marshall, Leonora Cohen and Gertrude Harding; Edith Margaret Garrud was their jujitsu trainer.

The origin of the "Bodyguard" can be traced to a WSPU meeting at which Garrud spoke. As suffragettes speaking in public increasingly found themselves the target of violence and attempted assaults, learning jujitsu was a way for women to defend themselves against angry hecklers. Inciting incidents included Black Friday, during which a deputation of 300 suffragettes were physically prevented by police from entering the House of Commons, sparking a near-riot and allegations of both common and sexual assault.

Members of the "Bodyguard" orchestrated the "escapes" of a number of fugitive suffragettes from police surveillance during 1913 and early 1914. They also participated in several violent actions against the police in defence of their leaders, notably including the "Battle of Glasgow" on 9 March 1914, when a group of about 30 Bodyguards brawled with about 50 police constables and detectives on the stage of St Andrew's Hall in Glasgow. The fight was witnessed by an audience of some 4500 people.

== World War I ==
At the commencement of World War I, the suffragette movement in Britain moved away from suffrage activities and focused on the war effort, and as a result, hunger strikes largely stopped. In August 1914, the British Government released all prisoners who had been incarcerated for suffrage activities on an amnesty, with Pankhurst ending all militant suffrage activities soon after. The suffragettes' focus on war work turned public opinion in favour of their eventual partial enfranchisement in 1918.

Women eagerly volunteered to take on many traditional male roles – leading to a new view of what women were capable of. The war also caused a split in the British suffragette movement; the mainstream, represented by Emmeline and Christabel Pankhurst's WSPU calling a ceasefire in their campaign for the duration of the war, while more radical suffragettes, represented by Sylvia Pankhurst's Women's Suffrage Federation continued the struggle.

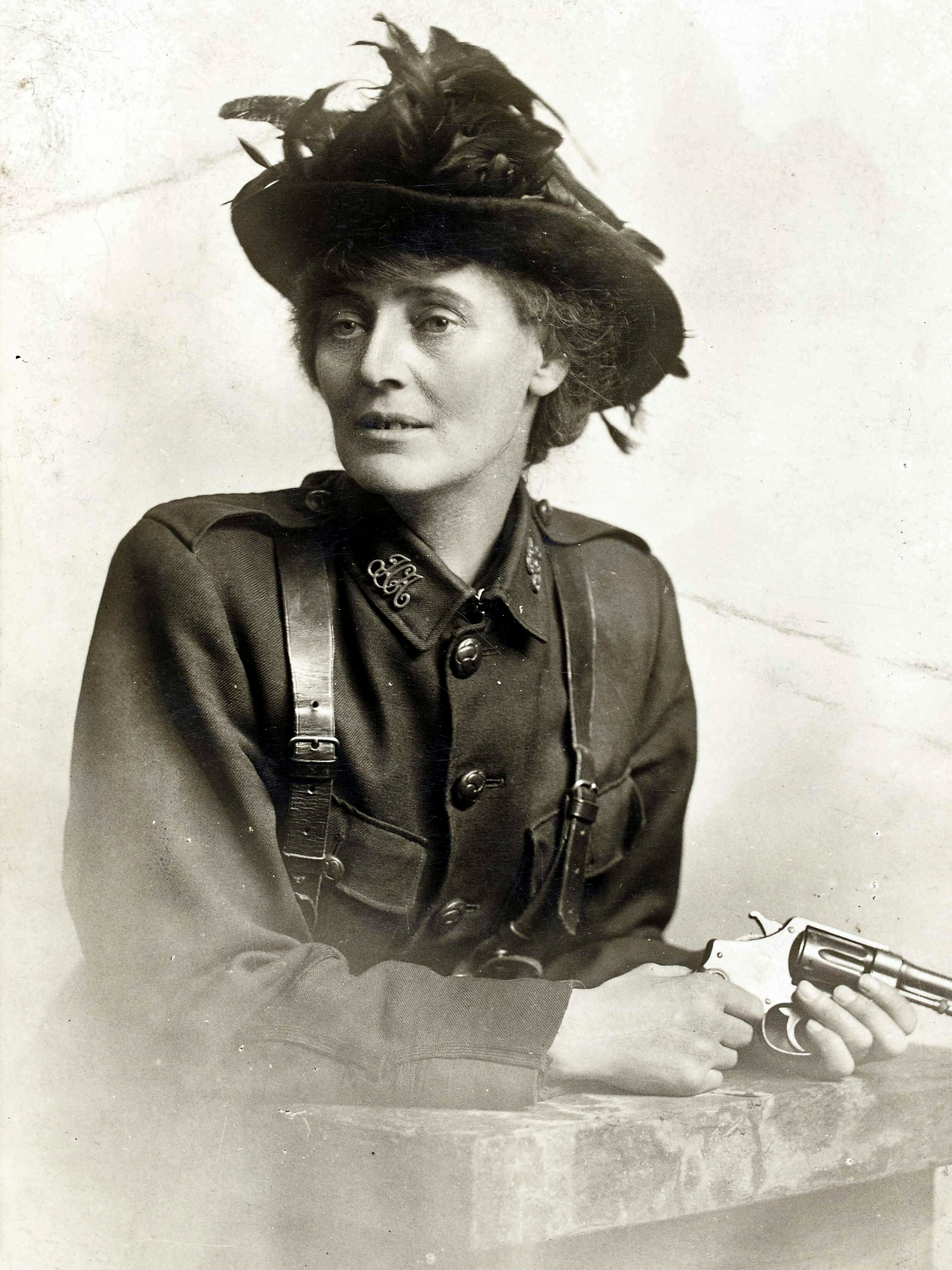
Countess Markiewicz (1868–1927)

Prominent British-Indian suffragette Sophia Duleep Singh, the third daughter of the exiled Sikh Maharajah Duleep Singh, campaigned for support for the British Indian Army and lascars working in the Merchant Navy. She also joined a 10,000-woman protest march against the prohibition of a volunteer female force. Singh volunteered as a British Red Cross Voluntary Aid Detachment nurse, serving at an auxiliary military hospital in Isleworth from October 1915 to January 1917.

The National Union of Women's Suffrage Societies, which had always employed "constitutional" methods, continued to lobby during the war years and compromises were worked out between the NUWSS and the coalition government. On 6 February, the Representation of the People Act 1918 was passed, enfranchising all men over 21 years of age and women over the age of 30 who met minimum property qualifications, gaining the right to vote for about 8.4 million women. In November 1918, the Parliament (Qualification of Women) Act 1918 was passed, allowing women to be elected into parliament. The Representation of the People Act 1928 extended the voting franchise to all women over the age of 21, granting women the vote on the same terms that men had gained ten years earlier.

== 1918 general election, women members of parliament ==
The 1918 general election, the first general election to be held after the Representation of the People Act 1918, was the first in which some women (property owners older than 30) could vote. At that election, the first woman to be elected an MP was Constance Markievicz but, in line with Sinn Féin abstentionist policy, she declined to take her seat in the British House of Commons. The first woman to do so was Nancy Astor, Viscountess Astor, following a by-election in November 1919.

== Legacy ==
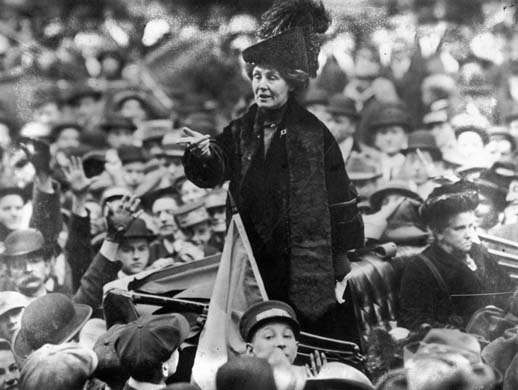
Emmeline Pankhurst travelled constantly, giving speeches throughout Britain and the US. One of her most famous speeches, "Freedom or death", was delivered in Connecticut in 1913.

In the autumn of 1913, Emmeline Pankhurst had sailed to the US to embark on a lecture tour to publicise the message of the WSPU and to raise money for the treatment of her son, Harry, who was gravely ill. By this time the suffragettes' tactics of civil disorder were being used by American militants Alice Paul and Lucy Burns, both of whom had campaigned with the WSPU in London. As in the UK, the suffrage movement in America was divided into two disparate groups, with the National American Woman Suffrage Association representing the more militant campaign and the International Women's Suffrage Alliance taking a more cautious and pragmatic approach Although the publicity surrounding Pankhurst's visit and the militant tactics used by her followers gave a welcome boost to the campaign, the majority of women in the US preferred the more respected label of "suffragist" to the title "suffragette" adopted by the militants.

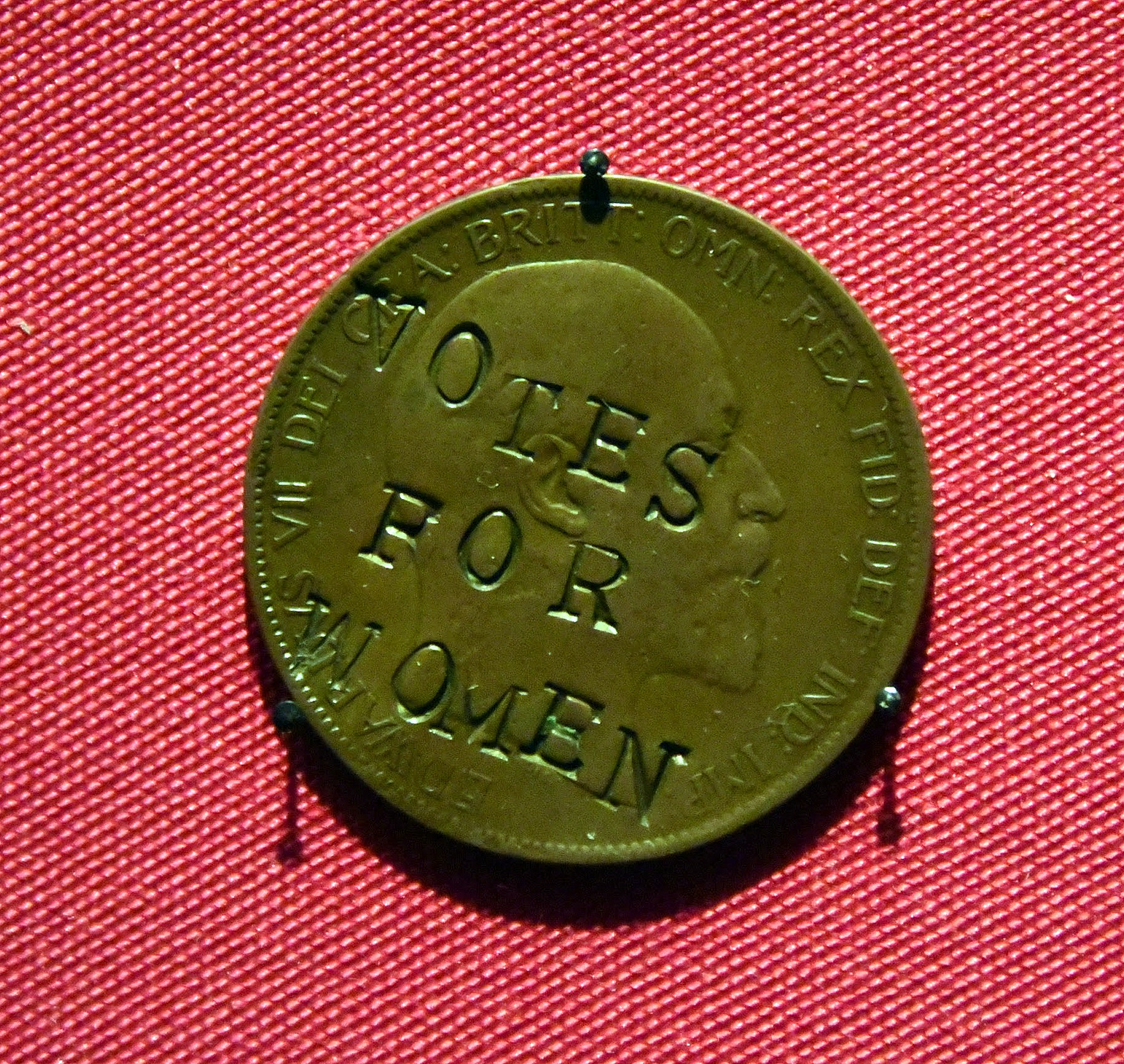
"Votes for Women", a penny defaced by suffragettes in the UK, 1930 or later. One penny of Edward VII, obverse, copper, 1903. On display at the British Museum.

Many suffragists at the time, and some historians since, have argued that the actions of the militant suffragettes damaged their cause. Opponents at the time saw evidence that women were too emotional and could not think as logically as men. Historians generally argue that the first stage of the militant suffragette movement under the Pankhursts in 1906 had a dramatic mobilising effect on the suffrage movement. Women were thrilled and supportive of an actual revolt in the streets. The membership of the militant WSPU and the older NUWSS overlapped and were mutually supportive. However, a system of publicity, Ensor argues, had to continue to escalate to maintain its high visibility in the media. The hunger strikes and force-feeding did that, but the Pankhursts refused any advice and escalated their tactics. They turned to systematic disruption of Liberal Party meetings as well as physical violence in terms of damaging public buildings and arson. Searle says the methods of the suffragettes harmed the Liberal Party but failed to advance women's suffrage. When the Pankhursts decided to stop their militancy at the start of the war and enthusiastically support the war effort, the movement split and their leadership role ended. Suffrage came four years later, but the feminist movement in Britain permanently abandoned the militant tactics that had made the suffragettes famous.

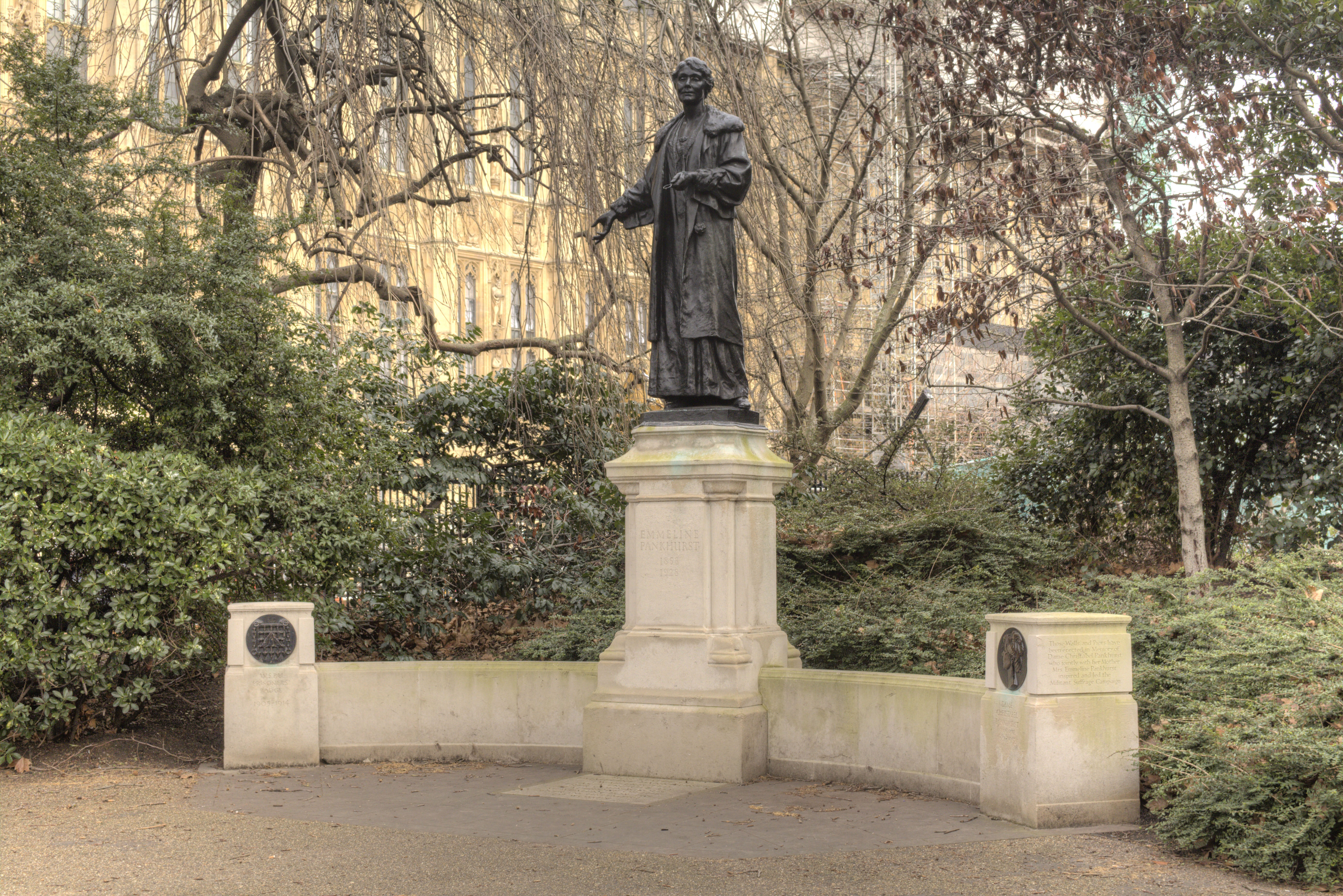
The Emmeline and Christabel Pankhurst Memorial at the entrance to Victoria Tower Gardens which is adjacent to the Houses of Parliament, London

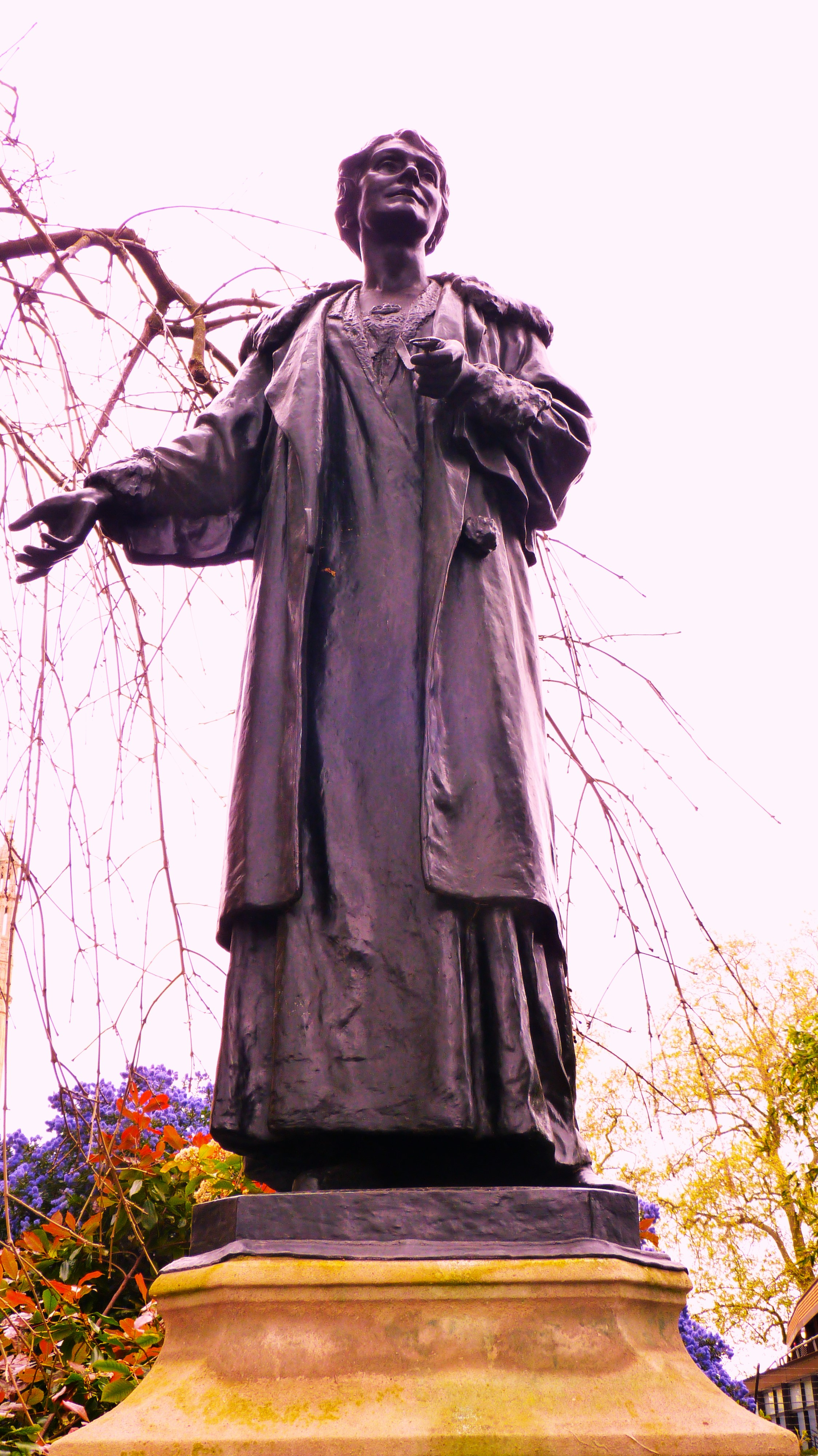

After Emmeline Pankhurst's death in 1928, money was raised to commission a statue, and on 6 March 1930 the statue in Victoria Tower Gardens was unveiled. A crowd of radicals, former suffragettes and national dignitaries gathered as former Prime Minister Stanley Baldwin presented the memorial to the public. In his address, Baldwin declared:

"I say with no fear of contradiction, that whatever view posterity may take, Mrs. Pankhurst has won for herself a niche in the Temple of Fame which will last for all time".

In 1929 a portrait of Emmeline Pankhurst was added to the National Portrait Gallery's collection. In 1987 her former home at 62 Nelson Street, Manchester, the birthplace of the WSPU, and the adjoining Edwardian villa (no. 60) were opened as the Pankhurst Centre, a women-only space and museum dedicated to the suffragette movement. Christabel Pankhurst was appointed a Dame Commander of the Order of the British Empire in 1936, and after her death in 1958 a permanent memorial was installed next to the statue of her mother. The memorial to Christabel Pankhurst consists of a low stone screen flanking her mother's statue with a bronze medallion plaque depicting her profile at one end of the screen paired with a second plaque depicting the "prison brooch" or "badge" of the WSPU at the other end. The unveiling of this dual memorial was performed on 13 July 1959 by the Lord Chancellor, Lord Kilmuir. The Pankhurst's name and image and those of 58 other women's suffrage supporters are etched on the plinth of the statue of Millicent Fawcett in Parliament Square, London that was unveiled in 2018.

In 1903, the Australian suffragist Vida Goldstein adopted the WSPU colours for her campaign for the Senate in 1910 but got them slightly wrong since she thought that they were purple, green and lavender. Goldstein had visited England in 1911 at the behest of the WSPU. Her speeches around the country drew huge crowds and her tour was touted as "the biggest thing that has happened in the women movement for sometime in England". The correct colours were used for her campaign for Kooyong in 1913 and also for the flag of the Women's Peace Army, which she established during World War I to oppose conscription. During International Women's Year in 1975 the BBC series about the suffragettes, Shoulder to Shoulder, was screened across Australia and Elizabeth Reid, Women's Adviser to Prime Minister Gough Whitlam directed that the WSPU colours be used for the International Women's Year symbol. They were also used for a first-day cover and postage stamp released by Australia Post in March 1975. The colours have since been adopted by government bodies such as the National Women's Advisory Council and organisations such as Women's Electoral Lobby and other women's services such as domestic violence refuges and are much in evidence each year on International Women's Day.

The colours of green and heliotrope (purple) were commissioned into a new coat of arms for Edge Hill University in Lancashire in 2006, symbolising the university's early commitment to the equality of women through its beginnings as a women-only college.

During the 1960s, the memory of the suffragettes was kept alive in the public consciousness by portrayals in film, such as the character Mrs Winifred Banks in the 1964 Disney musical film Mary Poppins who sings the song "Sister Suffragette" and Maggie DuBois in the 1965 film The Great Race. In 1974 the BBC TV series Shoulder to Shoulder portraying events in the British militant suffrage movement and concentrating on the lives of members of the Pankhurst family, was shown around the world. And in the 21st century the story of the suffragettes was brought to a new generation in the BBC television series Up the Women, the 2015 graphic novel trilogy Suffrajitsu: Mrs. Pankhurst's Amazons and the 2015 film Suffragette.

In recognition of having meetings at the Royal Albert Hall in London, the Suffragettes were inducted into the Hall's Walk of Fame in 2018, making them one of the first eleven recipients of a star on the walk, joining Eric Clapton, Winston Churchill, Muhammad Ali and Albert Einstein, among others who were viewed as "key players" in the building's history.

In February 2019, female Democrat members of the US Congress dressed predominantly in white when attending President Trump's State of the Union address. The choice of one of the colours associated with the suffragettes was to signify the women's solidarity.

In the 2020s, the Suffragette flag began to be increasingly used by British feminists protesting against transgender rights. However Ria Patel, the spokesperson on diversity and equality for the Green Party of England and Wales, argues that this use is problematic.

== National Archives Suffragette Resources and Roll of Honour ==
The National Archives has gathered together information about all aspects of the Suffragette movement, intended to be useful to teachers and students. The subtitle is "What did the struggle for the vote involve?", and the resource includes original documents with transcriptions of relevant extracts. Topics covered also include "campaign in photographs", ""Woman to watch" (a selection of police photographs of militant suffragists including their height and eye and hair colour) and secret codes used by the movement's leaders. Links to other topics, such as the "Cat and Mouse Act" are also included. The resource can be found here https://www.nationalarchives.gov.uk/education/resources/suffragettes-on-file/

A Roll of Honour of Suffragette Prisoners was compiled by the Suffragette Fellowship in the 1950s in the form of a pamphlet. The list is alphabetical and only lists names.

== Notable women ==
=== Great Britain ===
- Margaret Aldersley
- Mary Ann Aldham
- Doreen Allen
- Janie Allan
- Gertrude Ansell
- Joan Beauchamp
- Edith Marian Begbie
- Rosa May Billinghurst
- Elsie Bowerman
- Janet Boyd
- Lady Constance Bulwer-Lytton
- Evaline Hilda Burkitt
- Mabel Capper
- Georgina Fanny Cheffins
- Ada Nield Chew
- Anne Cobden-Sanderson
- Leonora Cohen
- Rose Cohen
- Jessie Craigen
- Emily Wilding Davison
- Violet Mary Doudney
- Katherine Douglas Smith
- Flora Drummond
- Sophia Duleep Singh
- Norah Elam also known as Norah Dacre Fox
- Millicent Garrett Fawcett
- Edith Margaret Garrud
- Katie Edith Gliddon
- Cicely Hamilton
- Jane Ellen Harrison
- Vera Holme
- Edith How-Martyn
- Clemence Housman
- Elsie Inglis
- Annie Kenney
- Grace Kimmins
- Lilian Lenton
- Lizzy Lind af Hageby
- Mary Lowndes
- Florence Macfarlane
- Margaret Macfarlane
- Nellie Martel
- Selina Martin
- Marie Naylor
- Emmeline Pankhurst
- Christabel Pankhurst
- Sylvia Pankhurst
- Adela Pankhurst
- Frances Parker
- Emmeline Pethick-Lawrence
- Pleasance Pendred
- Isabella Potbury
- Mary Richardson
- Edith Rigby
- Bertha Ryland
- Myra Sadd Brown
- Arabella Scott
- Muriel Scott
- Genie Sheppard
- Alice Maud Shipley
- Jane Short
- Ethel Smyth
- Ethel Snowden
- Janie Terrero
- Dora Thewlis
- Catherine Tolson
- Helen Tolson
- Florence Tunks
- Leonora Tyson
- Laura Veale
- Vera Wentworth
- Olive Wharry
- Gertrude Wilkinson
- Laetitia Withall
- Celia Wray

=== Ireland ===
- Louie Bennett
- Mary Fleetwood Berry
- Helen Chenevix
- Frances Power Cobbe
- Margaret "Gretta" Cousins
- Charlotte Despard
- Norah Elam
- Katharine Gatty
- Eva Gore-Booth
- Anna Haslam
- Mary Hayden
- Kathleen Lynn
- Constance Markievicz
- Margaret McCoubrey
- Mary Ann McCracken
- Mary MacSwiney
- Helena Molony
- Florence Moon
- Mary Donovan O'Sullivan
- Sarah Persse
- Jennie Wyse Power
- Hanna Sheehy-Skeffington
- Isabella Tod
- Anna Wheeler

== Gallery ==
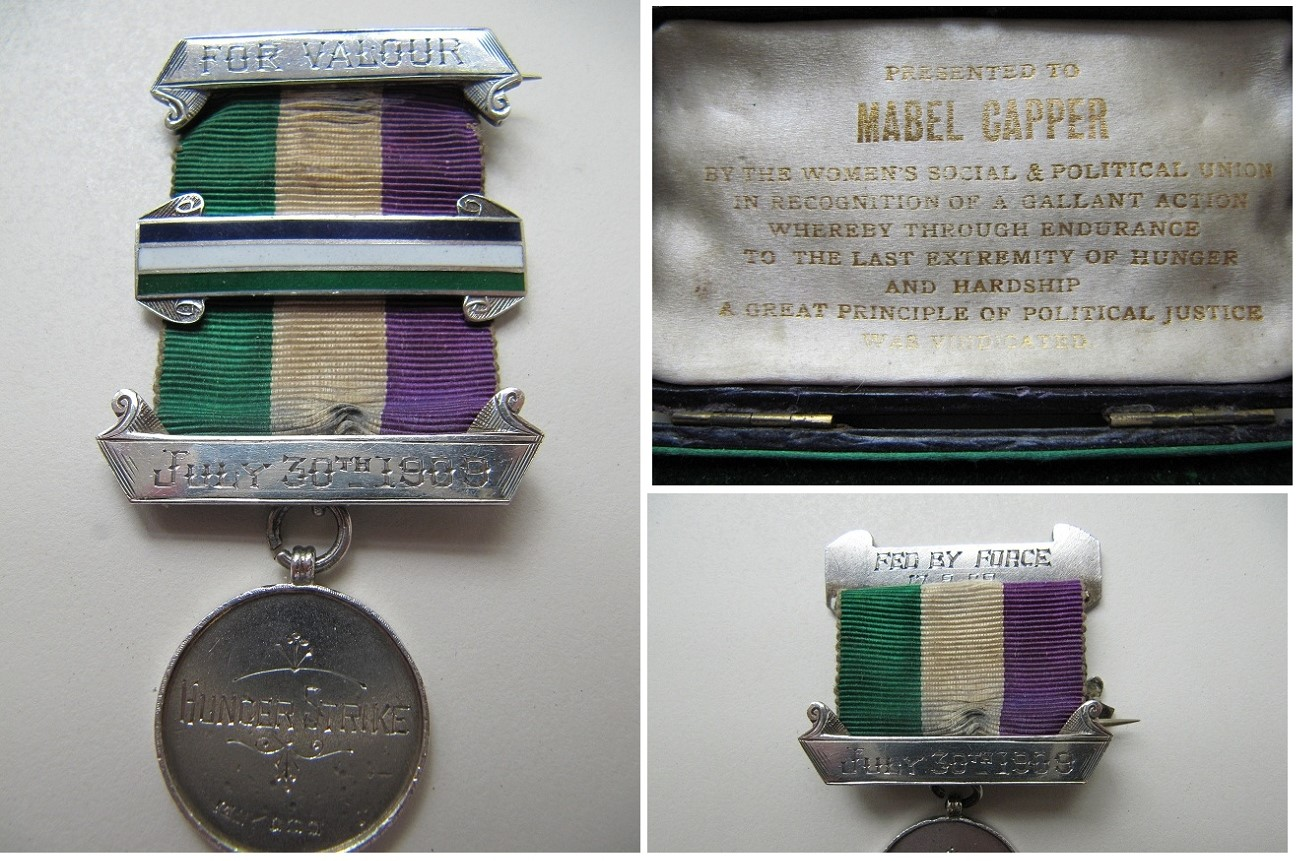
UK WSPU Hunger Strike Medal 30 July 1909 including the bar 'Fed by Force 17 September 1909'. The Medal awarded to Mabel Capper records the first instance of forcible feeding of Suffragette prisoners in England at Winson Green Prison.

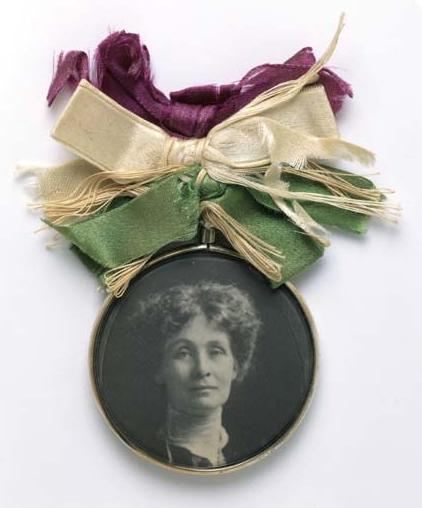
Portrait badge of Emmeline Pankhurst (c. 1909) sold in large numbers by the WSPU to raise funds

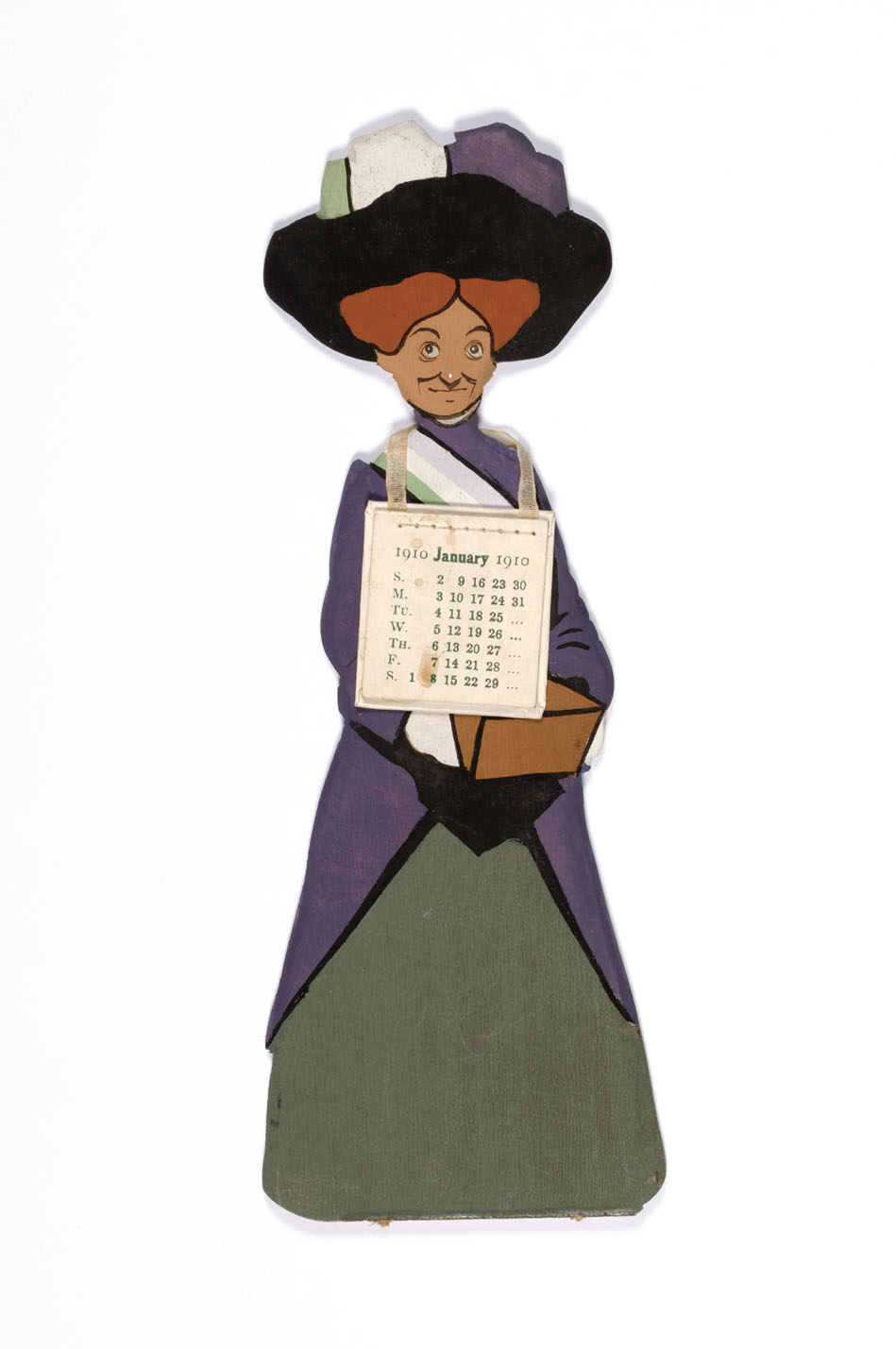
1910 Suffragette calendar held in the collections of the Herbert Art Gallery & Museum, Coventry

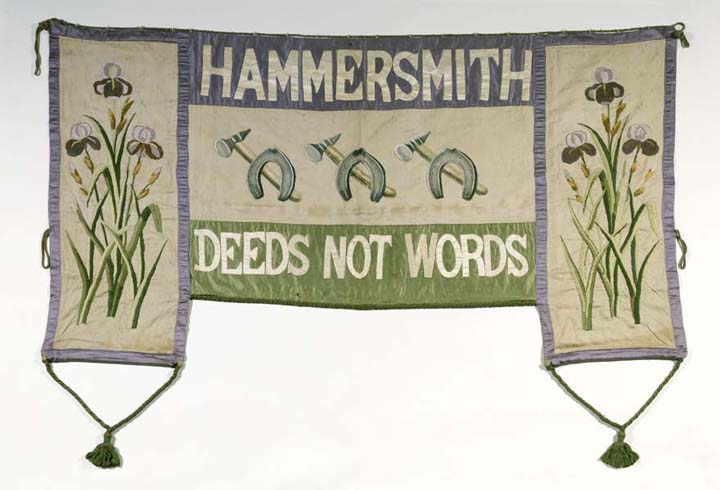
Suffragette Banner (c. 1910)

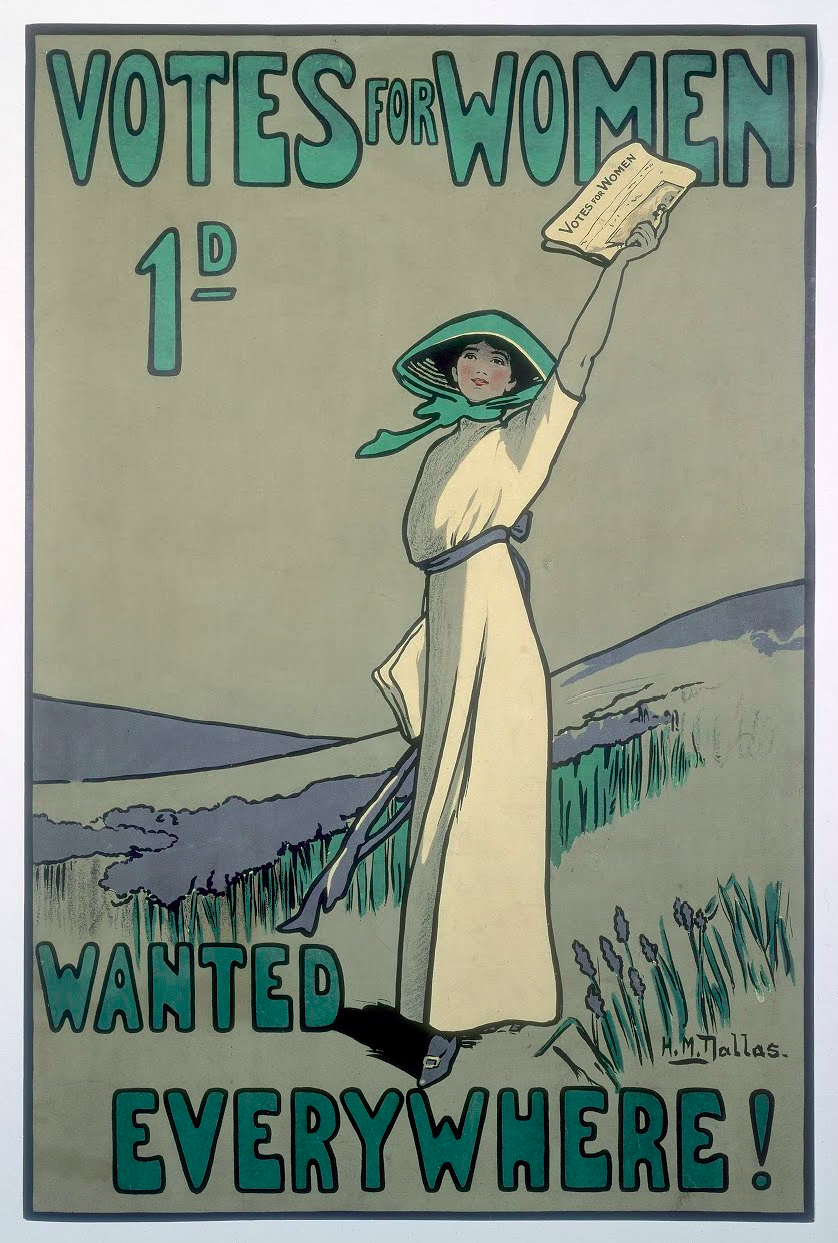
Votes for Women poster (1909)

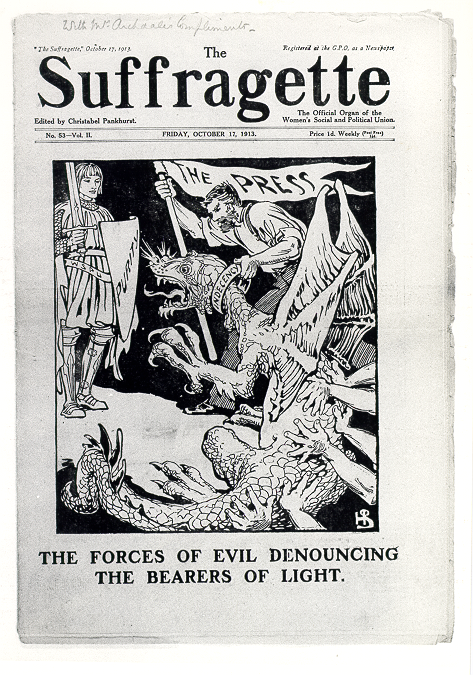
7 October 1913 edition of The Suffragette

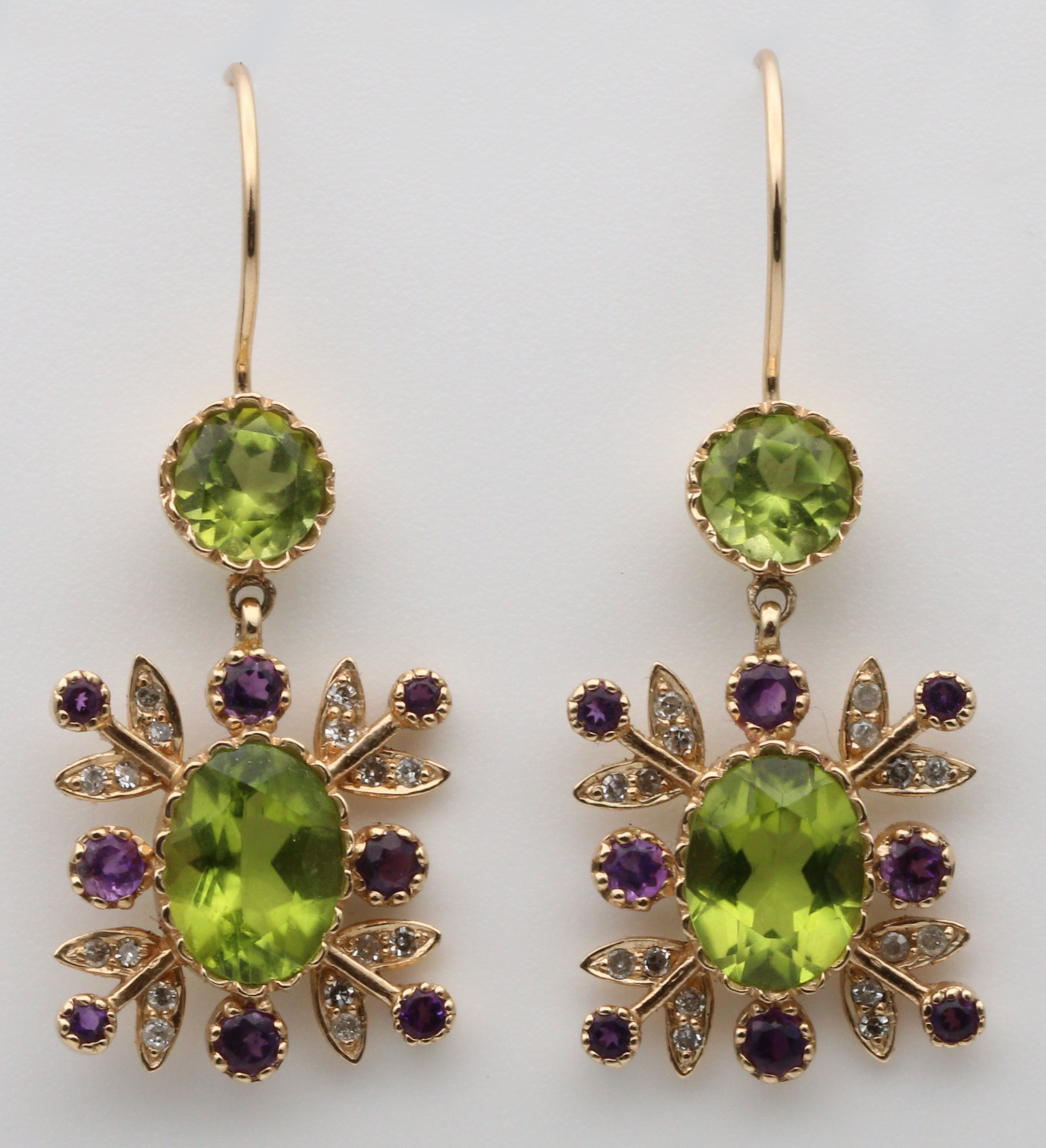
Gold earrings in suffragette colours

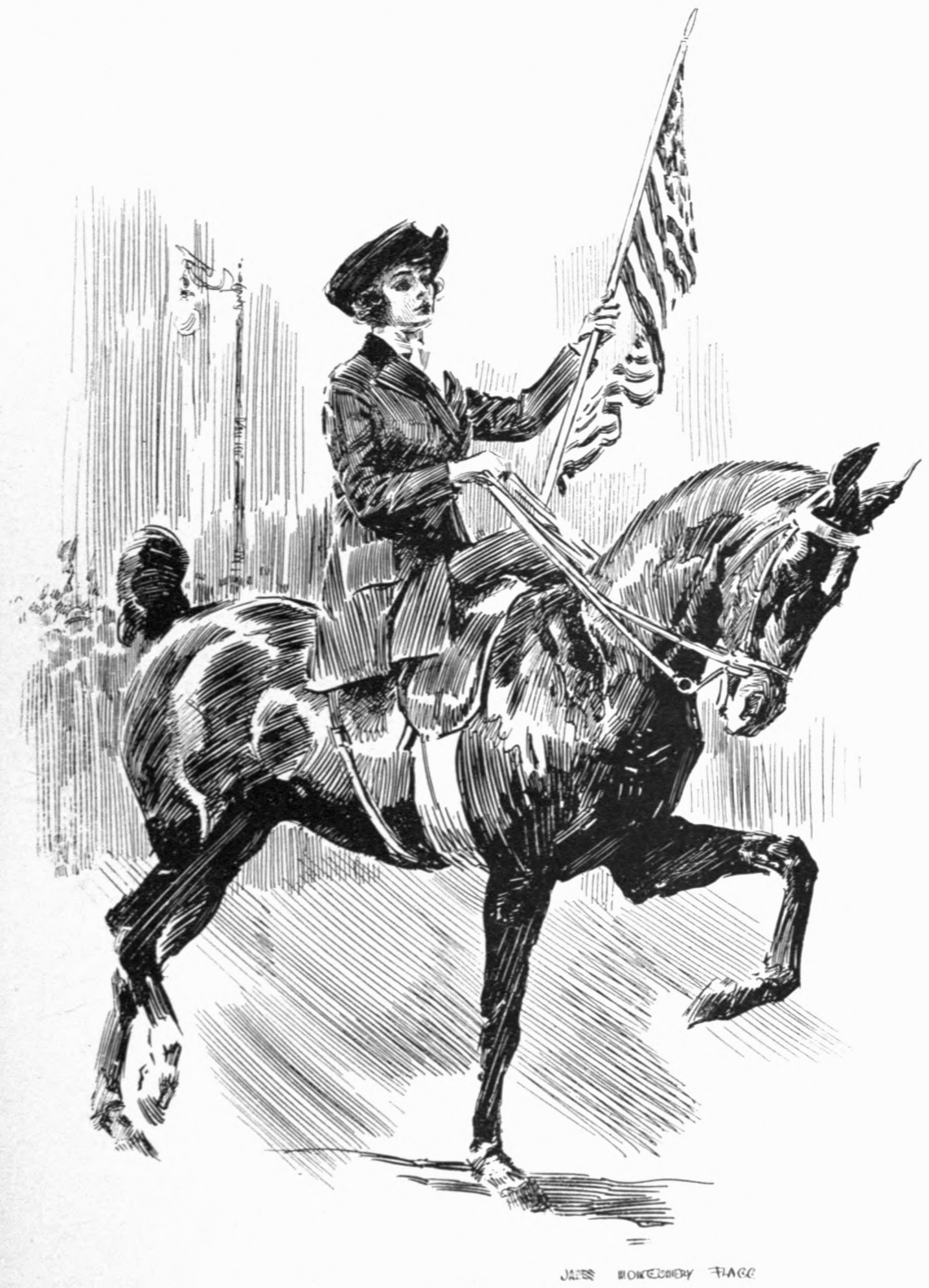
An illustration of a suffragette on a horse, waving an American flag, in the 1916 novel The Fifth Wheel by Olive Higgins Prouty

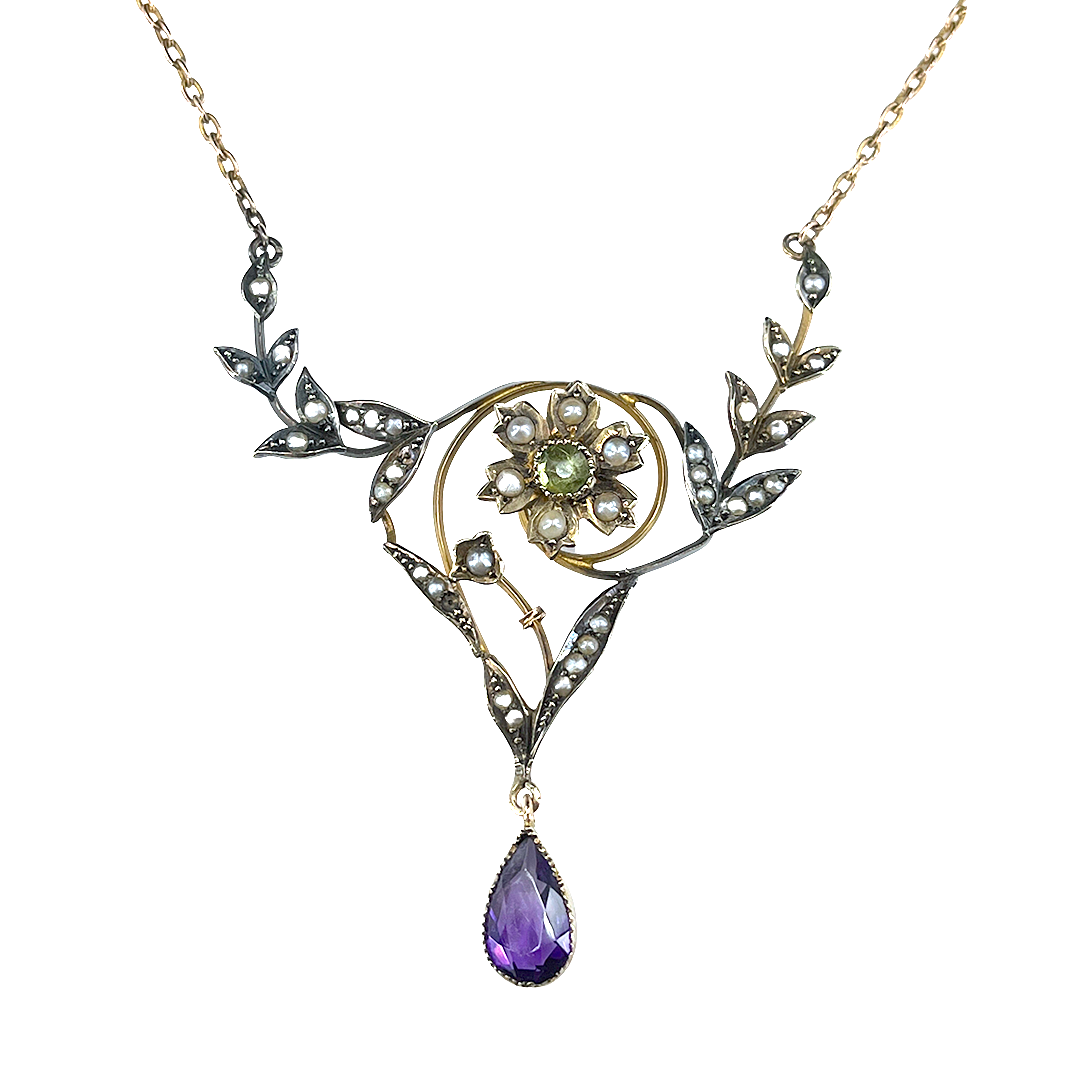
An Art Nouveau era Suffragette necklace with amethyst, pearl, and peridot set in 9K gold.

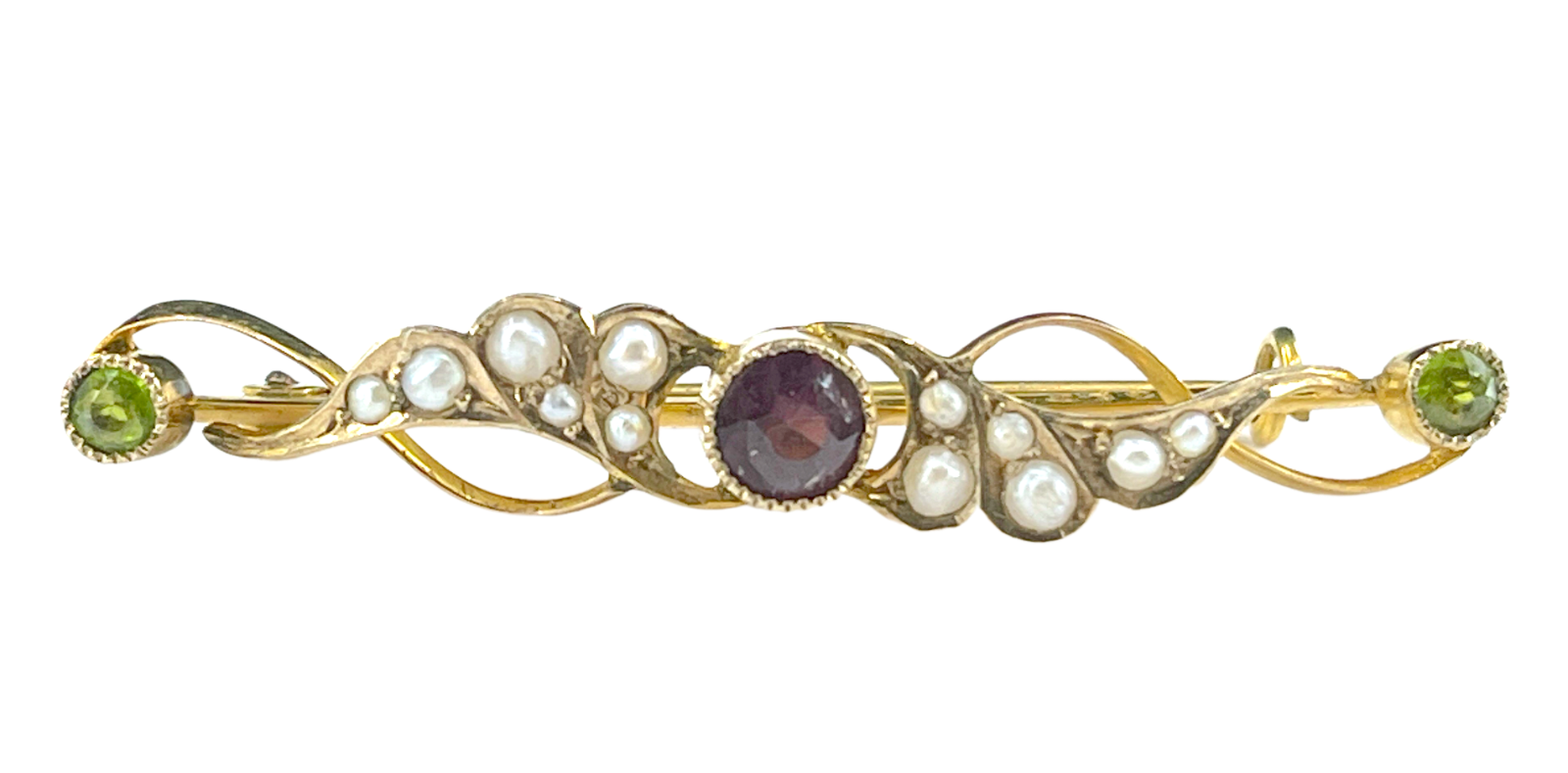
A 9K gold Art Nouveau era Suffragette brooch with amethyst, pearl, and peridot.

== See also ==
- List of women's rights activists
- Men's League for Women's Suffrage (United Kingdom)
- Pankhurst Centre
- Suffragette bombing and arson campaign
- Suffragetto, a board game
- White Feather Movement
- Women's suffrage in the United Kingdom
  - Women's suffrage in Scotland
  - Women's suffrage in Wales
- Women's suffrage organisations
- Women's suffrage in the United States

== Notes ==
^α The Oxford English Dictionary has this, "Originally a generic term, suffragist came to refer specifically to those advocates of women's suffrage who campaigned through peaceful, constitutional measures, in distinction to the suffragettes who employed direct action and civil disobedience."

== Works cited ==
- Bolt, Christine (1993). The Women's Movements in the United States and Britain from the 1790s to the 1920s. Amherst, MA: University of Massachusetts Press. ISBN 978-0-870-23866-6.
- Crawford, Elizabeth (1999). The Women's Suffrage Movement: A Reference Guide, 1866–1928. London: UCL Press. ISBN 978-1-841-42031-8.
- Geddes, J. F. (2008). "Culpable Complicity: the medical profession and the forcible feeding of suffragettes, 1909–1914". Women's History Review. 17 (1): 79–94. doi:10.1080/09612020701627977. S2CID 145175769.
- Grant, Kevin (2011). "British suffragettes and the Russian method of hunger strike". Comparative Studies in Society and History. 53 (1): 113–143. doi:10.1017/S0010417510000642. S2CID 143476849.
- Harrison, Brian (2013) [1978]. Separate Spheres: The Opposition to Women's Suffrage in Britain. Abingdon: Routledge. ISBN 978-0-415-62336-0.
- Miller, Ian (2009). "Necessary Torture? Vivisection, Suffragette Force-Feeding, and Responses to Scientific Medicine in Britain c. 1870–1920". Journal of the History of Medicine and Allied Sciences. 64 (3): 333–372. doi:10.1093/jhmas/jrp008. PMID 19357183. S2CID 41978888.
- Pedersen, Susan (2004). Eleanor Rathbone and the Politics of Conscience. New Haven, CT: Yale University Press. ISBN 978-0-300-10245-1.
- Purvis, June (1995a). "The Prison Experiences of the Suffragettes in Edwardian Britain". Women's History Review. 4 (1): 103–133. doi:10.1080/09612029500200073.
- Williams, John (2001). "Hunger Strikes: A Prisoner's Right or a 'Wicked Folly'?". Howard Journal. 40 (3): 285–296. doi:10.1111/1468-2311.00208.
