= Catherine Winter =

Catherine Winter may refer to:

- Catherine Winter (campaigner), Irish publicist and campaigner died in 1870
- Kathryn Winter, a British ice dancer
