= Queen of Code =

Queen of Code is a nickname that has been given to coders and cryptanalysts.

These include:

- Emily Anderson OBE (1891 – 1962), Irish musician and codebreaker, the subject of Jackie Uí Chionna's biography Queen of Codes: The Secret Life of Emily Anderson, Britain's greatest lady code breaker (2023)
- Rear Admiral Grace Hopper (1906 – 1992), American programmer and naval officer, the subject of FiveThirtyEight's documentary The Queen of Code (2015)
