= Margaret Byers =

Irish educator and social reformer (1832–1912)

- Born: Margaret Morrow; April 1832; Rathfriland, County Down, Ireland
- Died: 21 February 1912 (aged 79); Belfast, Ireland
- Resting place: Belfast City Cemetery
- Education: Trinity College Dublin
- Occupations: Educator; social reformer; missionary; writer
- Spouse: John Byers (m. 1850)

Margaret Byers (née Morrow; April 1832 – 21 February 1912) was an Irish educator, social reformer, missionary, and writer of the long nineteenth century. She was the founder of Victoria College, Belfast. Byers was involved in philanthropic work, with especial reference to the training of the young. She wrote many papers on different phases of the progress of girls' education in Ireland, on Irish industrial schools, and on temperance.

== Early life and education ==
Margaret Morrow was born in Windsor Hill, Rathfriland, County Down, Ireland, in April 1832. She was the only daughter of Andrew Morrow (died 1840), a temperance activist. Her mother was Margaret Herron Byers. She was educated privately, at Mrs. Treffry's school, Nottingham, and in England.

== Career ==
Byers worked as a student teacher under Mrs. Treffry for a year prior to marriage.

In 1850, she married Rev. John Byers, a Presbyterian missionary. They stopped for a short time in the United States before continuing to China as missionaries under the auspices of the American Presbyterian Church. In the U.S. Byers became acquainted with and became influenced by the idea that boys and girls should receive a similar education. In 1853, widowed, she returned New York, connecting with American religious women, and to Ireland in the following year at the behest of her mother, making her home in Belfast. Her son, Sir John Byers, became president of the Belfast Philosophical Society.

Byers became deeply interested in the conditions of Irish women and began efforts for their improvement. She founded and became director of Victoria College, which was prominent in pioneer educational work. The institution began as a secondary school before college education for women had been discussed. In 1878, she worked for the inclusion of girls in the benefits of the Irish Intermediate act. In 1881, the Royal University of Ireland offered its examination and degrees to women. Byers was the first Ulster woman to receive an honorary degree from a university. She was a member of the first senate of the Queen's University Belfast.

In conjunction with Isabella Tod of the North of Ireland Suffrage Society and other women, in 1874 Byers founded the Belfast Women's Temperance Association and Christian Workers' Union. Out of this developed the Belfast Prison Gate Mission for Women and the Victoria Homes for the Reclamation and Training of Neglected and Destitute Girls.

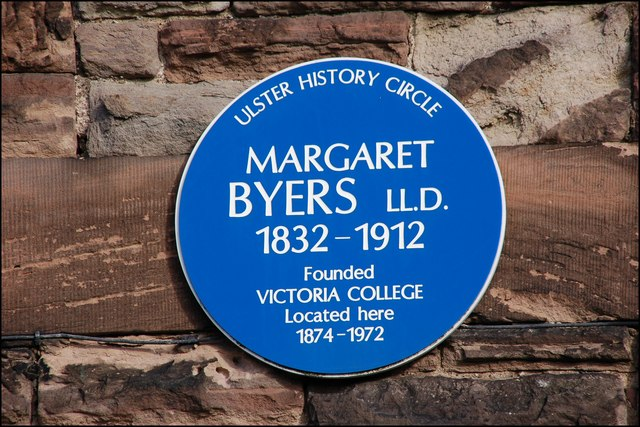
Margaret Byers' commemorative plaque

Byers was the first president of the Irish Women's Temperance Union. She was the author of many papers on different phases of the progress of girls' education in Ireland and on Irish industrial schools and temperance. She received the degree of LL. D. from Trinity College Dublin.

== Death ==
Byers died on 21 February 1912 and is buried in Belfast City Cemetery.
