= Sarah Persse =

Irish suffragist (1866–1927)

Sarah Henrietta Persse (10 March 1866 – 14 April 1927) was an Irish suffragist.

== Biography ==
Persee was born at Glenarde House, Galway to Henry Sadlier Persse, a high sheriff and owner of Nun's Island Distillery, and Eleanor Persse, a philanthropist. Persse was the third eldest of ten children. A member of the Persse family through her father, Persse was distantly related to Lady Gregory.

In 1899 she was one of two women candidates in the west and south ward of Galway's Poor Law Unions. She withdrew from consideration as a Poor Law Guardian a day before the elections owing to the death of her father in 1900, and did not contest any future election.

Following her brother, William Persse, and his family moving into Glenarde House, Persse left the family home and later settled in Berkeley Square, London. On 14 April 1927, Persse died in London.

== See also ==
- Emily Anderson
- Mary Donovan O'Sullivan
- Florence Moon
- Mary Fleetwood Berry
