= Mary Fleetwood Berry =

Irish suffragist (1865–1956)

Mary Fleetwood Berry (24 April 1865 – 25 January 1956) was an Irish suffragist who advocated for women's right to vote between 1900–1918. Berry was a member of the Connacht Women's Franchise League, and the wife of James Fleetwood Berry, Rector of St. Nicholas' Collegiate Church. She was an active member of the Women's National Health Association.

== Early life and education ==
Mary Fleetwood Berry was born on 24 April 1865 in Monkstown, a suburb of Cork, Ireland, to Abraham Thomas Chatterton and Jane Chatterton of Dublin. In 1887 she married Reverend James Fleetwood Berry of Tullamore, County Offaly, with whom she had one son. Alongside her husband's profession as a minister, she was known for having a strong Evangelical Protestant identity.

She was elected president of the Irish Women's Temperance Union in 1900 and 1912. She was also an active member of the Connacht Women's Franchise League, one of the most outspoken and public manifestations of women's discontent and radical feminism in Ireland. Its primary goal was to secure women's suffrage within Irish Home Rule.

In 1917 Berry's son was killed in action in France from wounds received at Bait Aiesa in Mesopotamia, which is now modern Iraq.

She died on 25 January 1956 at the age of 90 years old in Salthill, County Galway, Ireland.

== Ideas, influences and political stances ==
She was elected president of Irish Women's Temperance Union in 1900 and 1912. The Temperance movement was a social movement against the consumption of alcoholic beverages. Temperance movements typically criticize alcohol intoxication, promote complete abstinence (teetotalism), or use their political influence to press the government to enact alcohol laws to regulate the availability of alcohol or even its complete prohibition.

In January 1913, Mary Fleetwood Berry was instrumental in establishing a branch of the constitutional Irish Women's Suffrage Federation, an organisation then linking twenty-six societies nationally. The federation was founded in 1911 to unite scattered suffrage societies in Ireland.

The role of Mary Fleetwood Berry, whose political contacts were conservative and religious, represents a shift in influence.

With the outbreak of the First World War, Moon, she and many other Galway suffragists became involved in efforts concerning the war, such as fundraising and provisions. In this capacity she attended the first annual meeting of the Galway War Fund Association in Galway town hall on 31 May 1916.

The law that changed things for women's right to vote was called the Representation of the People Act, 1918, But not for every woman – just women over 30, who had property rights or a university education.

The act also gave the vote to all men over the age of 21. When it was passed, because of the criteria around a ‘property qualification’, this meant that just 40% of all the women in the United Kingdom could vote. Meanwhile, property and other restrictions for men were actually abolished, and men in the armed forces were allowed to vote from the age of 21.

Upon gaining independence from the United Kingdom in 1922, Irish women over the age of 21 had to wait until the Constitution was drawn up to ensure full and equal voting rights. This happened in 1922 with the Constitution of the Irish Free State Act.

== See also ==
- Emily Anderson
- Mary Donovan O'Sullivan
- Florence Moon
- Sarah Persse
