= Isa Macnie =

Irish croquet player, cartoonist, suffragist and activist

Isabella Mary Macnie
- Born: 9 August 1869; Dublin
- Died: April 1958 (aged 88); Dublin, Ireland
- Known for: caricatures

Isa Macnie (9 August 1869 – April 1958), was an Irish croquet champion, cartoonist, suffragist, and activist.

== Life ==
Isabella Mary Macnie was born one of several children to George Macnie and Frances Leckie in Clontarf, Dublin, on 9 August 1869. Her father was a Scottish master printer and Justice of the peace. Macnie was a skilled sportswoman and, in 1907, became the Irish Ladies' Croquet Champion. She was also renowned as an actress, sketch writer, composer, and pianist. Macnie took up cartooning in her fifties. She used the penname Mac in the publication of her cartoons, which tended to cover political figures of the day. She published her book of caricatures, The Celebrity Zoo, in 1925, with accompanying satirical verses.

Macnie was an active suffragist and philanthropist. She was a member of the Dublin University Dramatic Society, the Dublin United Arts Club, and the Irish Women’s Reform League. She did charity work to support the victims of the Titanic disaster and, during the First World War, nursing and the Red Cross. Her nephew, George Macnie, was killed in Macedonia in 1916. She was secretary with Marion Duggan of the Irishwomen’s Association of Citizenship and submitted to The Irish Citizen.

Chin Angles was her best-known cartoon, and it hangs in the Hugh Lane Gallery. Others of her works are in the National Library.

She died in April 1958.

== See also ==
Theo Snoddy, Dictionary of Irish Artists: 20th Century, Merlin Publishing, 2002
