= Irish Women's Temperance Union =

Organisation based in Belfast

Irish Women's Temperance Union (IWTU) was an Irish non-sectarian and non-political organization, founded in Belfast in 1894, for the purpose of promoting temperance among the women of Ireland. Margaret Byers served as its first president. The Union advocated for temperance (the abstention from alcohol) through activities in schools, workplaces and through private and public meetings. The Union ran a Home for Girls and a Home for Inebriate Women, and supported missionary work.

== History ==
The Irish Women's Temperance Union was an Irish non-sectarian and non-political organization, founded in Belfast in May 1894, for the purpose of promoting temperance among the women of Ireland. It was created to draw together the efforts of individual societies that already existed but had no umbrella organisation. Margaret Byers served as its first president. By 1899 the Union had seventy component societies. The Union conducted temperance work in schools and at local fairs by means of temperance cafes and tea tents, and it held mothers' meetings. It conducted a Home for Girls, which cared for 1,000 girls (as of 1926), and a Home for Inebriate Women, which admitted more than 250 patients (as of 1926). It supported temperance missionaries for work among women.

Notable people involved with the Union included Sarah R. Barcroft, president of Newry; and Mary Fleetwood Berry, president of Galway. Mrs Beale and Mrs J.H. Thompson represented Cork, Emily Foot and Charlotte Edmundson represented Dublin, Isabella Tod was for Belfast, and Mrs Richardson for Bessbrook.

A petition in favour of the Early Saturday and Sunday Closing Bill was signed, and a representative of the Union spent some time in London endeavouring to gain support among Members of Parliament, however, the Bill could not be introduced.

The official organ of the Union, Echoes of Erin, was issued in January, April, and September of each year.

The Union's papers are held at The National Archives, and span the period 1899 to circa 1927.
