= Catherine Winter (campaigner) =

Irish publicist and campaigner

- Born: Catherine Maillard
- Died: 1870

Catherine Winter (died 1870) was an Irish publicist and campaigner.

== Biography ==
Winter was the only daughter of James Nicholas Maillard, a Brigade Major in the army, and Catherine Stubber. Her father's family were from the West Indies and her parents were married in Dublin in 1801.

Winter married Edward Winter, but he died before 1848. Winter was in Paris working as a teacher before she returned to Ireland to put in a claim against a cousin, Robert Hamilton Stubber, who she believed had possession of an estate which should have been hers. She commenced a long campaign against him both in the courts and in the public sphere.

Distrustful of lawyers, Winters pled her case personally both in the courtroom and in judges’ chambers. This may have been the first time a woman did this in Ireland. Witnesses to her work were impressed by her legal knowledge although it did not prevent her case being thrown out of court by a judge in April 1850. On 19 May 1860, she used four bailiffs and attempted to drive away bullocks from her cousin's lands at Moyne. In October 1861 Winters and a servant squatted in one of his castles in Galway. After resisting eviction she was tried, and spent six weeks in jail around April 1862.

In 1861 she sought to be allowed to vote in an election. The election official confirmed that Winter was qualified except for being a woman. Winter spoke to women's groups more than once. Winters spoke at the Dublin Mechanics’ Institute in September 1851 and again in Dublin in October 1868. In the Rotunda in Dublin, on 28 June 1870 Winter gave a lecture where she expressed support for home rule.

Her brother Nicholas Maillard accompanied Winter to court and acted as her junior in court. Winter wrote numerous memoirs telling her story, which also included clippings from contemporary newspapers. Winter also gave long and rambling speeches including claiming kinship with the O'Malleys of Clare and Fionn mac Cumhaill. Winter never succeeded in gaining control of her cousin's estates and when he died in 1863 his estates passed on to his descendants.

== Bibliography ==
- The adventures of a new silk gown!!! Or, a barrister in petticoats (1857)
- One of the O'Mailleys (1862)
- A letter to ... the earl of Aberdeen (1854)
- Second letter to ... the earl of Aberdeen (1854)
