= Marion Duggan =

Irish suffragist and activist (1884 - 1943)

- Born: 27 July 1884; Kilbeggan, County Westmeath, Ireland
- Died: 24 June 1943 (aged 58); Dublin
- Education: Trinity College Dublin

Marion Duggan (27 July 1884 – 24 June 1943), was an Irish suffragist and activist. She organised volunteers to report on all-male courts where they were trying crimes against women after hearing of judges leniency including excusing a man's "impulses". She, in time, became the fifth woman to be an Irish barrister.

== Life ==
Born to James Duggan, a clerk, and Elizabeth née Denham in Kilbeggan, she was christened Marion Elizabeth Duggan in St. Mark's Church, Dublin. Her father was a sub agent for the Bank of Ireland, as a result they moved around living in Rossleaghan, Borris in 1901 and Ranelagh in 1911.

== Suffrage activism ==
Duggan was the third woman graduate of law, getting her degree in 1910 from Trinity College Dublin and a prominent suffragist in Dublin. An issue of The Irish Citizen included the article entitled ‘The Discovery of the Femaculine’, uses a term coined by Duggan. She was particularly concerned by the incidence of domestic violence and sexual assaults both in society and how they were treated by the courts. Men were often treated with leniency and gaining the vote was seen as a crucial step in changing this. Duggan was the secretary of the Irish Women’s Reform League. They were concerned that any woman brought to court faced a jury, judge and lawyers who were all men. Women were barred from working as lawyers until the Sex Disqualification (Removal) Act 1919 and were almost never able to serve on juries until 1976. There were a number of cases involving the assault of children including one where the perpetrator served two weeks for the crime, or another where the charge was not followed through because the victim was 7. Duggan was furious when Justice William Huston Dodd instructed the all-male jury to take into account “the natural and irresistible impulses animating the man” in 1914. She wrote to the 'Irish Citizen' and formed a Courts Watch committee to attend the public sessions when a woman was in court. Even this caused difficulty when the cases were considered to contain indecent information. There was often an attempt to eject the women from the gallery. On 19 June 1915 the 'Irish Citizen' asked "When will men realize that women are part of the public, that they are fully entitled to be present at all cases open to the public". It was Duggan who wrote most of the reports of the courts actions for publication.

Duggan was also vocal on assumptions about women, militancy and motherhood and women's pay and conditions, having also worked for the Irish Women Workers' Union and been a member of the Central Committee for Women's Employment for the provinces of Leinster, Munster and Connaught.

== Professional life ==
Once the legal impediment was eliminated Duggan was able to work in her field. She was called to the bar in 1925, the fifth woman in Ireland to be so. She was also formally appointed by the Law Reporting Council of Ireland in 1928. She was the first woman Law reporter but she was pressured to resign in 1934. She had worked as a secretary, a teacher and a journalist while unable to practice. Duggan died of heart failure in 1943 in Dublin.
