= Emily Anderson =

Irish cryptanalyst (1891–1962)

Emily Anderson (17 March 1891 – 26 October 1962) was an Irish scholar of German ancestry, music historian and cryptanalyst at the British Government Code and Cipher School (now GCHQ) for almost 30 years.

== Early life ==
Anderson was born in Galway, Ireland, the daughter of physicist Alexander Anderson, a Presbyterian from Coleraine, and his wife Emily Gertrude Binns. Alexander Anderson became president of Queens College Galway (QCG) in 1899.

She was educated privately and won the Browne Scholarship in both 1909 and 1910 at QCG, where she received a B.A. in 1911. She displayed a strong interest in the suffragette movement in Galway. After further study at universities in Berlin and Marburg, she taught for two years at Queen's College, Barbados. She then returned in 1917 to Galway, where she was appointed the first Professor of German at University College Galway.

== Career in cryptanalysis ==
Anderson was approached to join MI1b, the cryptanalysis section of the British War Office, in the autumn of 1917 and she moved to London to take up duty in July 1918. She was initially trained to join the Hush WAACs in France but was never deployed. She resigned her academic post for the duration of the war. Her deputy at MI1b was Alda Milner-Barry.

In 1919, Anderson returned to Cork to resume her academic career. Major Malcolm Vivian Hay and Alastair Denniston named Anderson as a codebreaker they wanted to keep in the newly formed Government Code and Cipher School (now GCHQ). Anderson agreed, but requested equal pay and grading to the men at her level. She resumed her career at GC&CS on 10 January 1920, with the cover story that she was working in the Foreign Office. Anderson became Head of the Italian Diplomatic section.

In the 1930s, Anderson collaborated with Dilly Knox on building the Hungarian codebreaking books. She also managed and trained codebreakers like Wilfred Bodsworth and Josh Cooper.

Anderson and her team moved from London to Bletchley Park in August 1939. She was initially billeted with Maurice Hayward and his family until October 1939 when she had moved, along with a woman who could have been Dorothy Brooks, to the family home of Patricia Bartley. Anderson recognised Bartley's potential and recommended her to Denniston.

In May 1940, Anderson asked to be closer to the point Italian signals were being intercepted, in order to decrypt them faster. Her request coincided with a request to Denniston from the commander in chief of the Middle East campaign, and he agreed she should be part of setting up a GC&CS branch closer to the Italian campaign in East Africa. Anderson and Brooks travelled by sea to Durban in South Africa and then overland to Heliopolis in Cairo. In Cairo, the team decrypted Italian Signals intelligence. In July 1943, Anderson was awarded the OBE by King George VI for her "services to the forces and in connection with military operations".

In May 1943, Anderson returned to London to work on German and Hungarian diplomatic codes in GC&CS's Berkeley Street offices. She remained with GC&CS, working primarily on Hungarian codes, until her retirement in November 1950.

== Writing career ==
In parallel with her secret career in GC&CS, Anderson gained public renown for her translation work. In 1923 she published a translation of Benedetto Croce's book on Goethe. She edited and translated The Letters of Mozart and His Family, which was published in 1938. Her Letters of Beethoven was published in 1961. West Germany awarded Anderson the Order of Merit (Officer's Cross First Class) for her work on Beethoven.

In November 1961, Anderson was interviewed on BBC radio about her work on the Beethoven Letters, and in 1962 she presented a lecture on Beethoven to the Royal Musical Association at the Royal Academy of Music.

== Personal life ==
Anderson never married. She shared a room with Dorothy Brooks whilst living with the Bartley's at Bletchley Park, and Patricia Bartley thought the women were lovers. Anderson asked that Brooks come with her to Cairo. She also, for four years in the 1950s, shared her flat in London with a woman. In Uí Chionna's biography, she suggests there was no economic reason for Anderson, a very private person, to take in a lodger.

Anderson died at Hampstead, London on 26 October 1962, after a period of heart problems and declining health.

== Legacy ==
The Royal Philharmonic Society awards the annual Emily Anderson Prize to young violinists in Anderson's honour.

NUI Galway has named their concert hall the Emily Anderson Concert Hall in her memory. Music for Galway, in conjunction with NUI Galway, holds an annual concert in her honour.

== See also ==
- Florence Moon
- Mary Donovan O'Sullivan

== Sources ==
- Obituary, The Times, Monday, 29 October 1962; pg. 12; Issue 55534; col F
- On the "Western Outpost":Local Government and Women's Suffrage in County Galway, 1898-1918, Mary Clancy, pp. 557–587, in "Galway:History and Society", 1996
- Translated Penguin Book – at Penguin First Editions reference site of early first edition Penguin Books.
