= Florence Moon =

Irish suffragist

- Born: Birmingham
- Known for: Suffrage work in Connacht, 1913–1918

Florence Moon was an Irish suffragist, born in Birmingham.

== Early life ==
Florence Moon was from Birmingham, where her mother was involved in suffrage work.

== Activism ==
Florence Moon attended a speech by Christabel Pankhurst in 1911, and became active as a suffrage organizer in Galway. She was a founder and leader of the Connacht Women's Franchise League (C.W.F.L.). In 1914 she was part of a C.W.F.L. deputation which met Stephen Gwynn, M.P., in order to obtain his support for women teachers. She was also an active member of the Women's National Health Association. With the outbreak of the First World War, Moon and many other Galway suffragists became involved in efforts concerning the war, such as fund-raising and provisions.

== Personal life ==
Florence Moon was married to Charles Moon, owner of a prestigious Galway drapery store. They had three children, Blanche, Elsa, and Charles. The couple left Galway in 1918, and lived in England thereafter.

== See also ==
- Emily Anderson
- Mary Donovan O'Sullivan
- Mary Fleetwood Berry
- Sarah Persse
