= Mary Josephine Donovan O'Sullivan =

Irish academic (1887–1966)

Maureen Donovan O'Sullivan
- Born: 24 November 1887; Fairhill, Galway, Ireland
- Died: 21 July 1966 (aged 78)
- Other name: Mary Donovan O'Sullivan
- Occupation: Professor of History
- Years active: 1914–1957
- Spouse: Jeremiah O'Sullivan

Mary Josephine Donovan O'Sullivan was professor of history at Queen's College, Galway (now NUI Galway) from 1914 to 1957. She was also a suffragette.

== Early life and education ==
One of ten children, four of whom survived infancy, Donovan was born at Fair Hill Road in Galway on 24 November 1887 and was the daughter of Royal Navy gunner William Donovan and Bridget Hurley, both natives of County Cork. She was educated at the Dominican College, Galway City, before studying modern languages at Queens College Galway.

After Donovan received her MA, she studied at the University of Marburg. In 1914, she was appointed professor of history at Queen's College Galway.

== Career ==
In 1916, Donovan O'Sullivan taught French and German at Queen's College, Galway, following the death of Professor Valentine Steinberger after his arrest during the Easter Uprising.

In 1920, Donovan O'Sullivan (as she was now credited) was elected to a Fellowship of the Royal Historical Society. Donovan O'Sullivan was editor of the Journal of the Galway Archaeological and Historical Society from November 1932 to January 1951.

In 1957, Donovan O'Sullivan was one of the first women elected as a member of the Royal Irish Academy.

Her main contribution to the history of Galway in the late medieval - early modern age was Old Galway, which examined the growth of the town, its culture and politics, its trade and its ruling families, the Tribes of Galway. Most of the first edition of the book was destroyed during The Blitz in London, and was only reprinted in 1959 in Galway. From early in the 1900s, she was an active member of the local women's suffrage movement.

== Personal life ==
In 1915, in Edinburgh she married Jeremiah O'Sullivan from County Tipperary who was serving in the Royal Engineers at the time.

She was a sister of John Thomas Donovan, late of the Indian Civil Service.

== Death ==
Donovan O'Sullivan died on 21 July 1966.

== Select bibliography ==
All the following were published in the Journal of the Galway Archaeological and Historical Society

- The Lay School at Galway in the sixteenth and seventeenth centuries, p. 1-32, Vol. 15, Nos. i & ii
- Glimpses of the life of Galway merchants and mariners in the early seventeenth century, pp. 129–140, volume 15, Nos. iii & iv
- The fortification of Galway in the sixteenth and early seventeenth centuries, pp. 1–47, volume 16 (1934–1935), Nos. i & ii, 1–47
- Barnabe Googe, Provost-Marshal of Connaught, 1582–1585, pp. 1–39, volume 18 (1938–1939), Nos. i & ii
- Note on the St. Nicholas MSS., pp. 69–71, volume 18 (1938–1939), Nos. i & ii
- The use of leisure in old Galway, pp. 99–120 volume 18(1938–1939), Nos. iii & iv
- Some documents relating to Galway, pp. 170–182, volume 18 (1938–1939), Nos. iii & iv
- The wives of Ulick, 1st Earl of Clanricarde, pp. 174–183, volume 21 (1944–1945), Nos. iii & iv
- Italian merchant bankers and the collection of papal revenues in Ireland in the thirteenth century, pp. 132–163, volume 22, (1946–1947), Nos. iii & iv
- The Centenary of Galway College, lecture delivered on 19 November 1949, published in volume 51, 1999.

== See also ==
- Emily Anderson
- Florence Moon
- James Lydon
