= List of British suffragists and suffragettes =

This is a list of British suffragists and suffragettes who were born in the British Isles or whose lives and works are closely associated with it.

== Suffragists and suffragettes ==
=== A ===
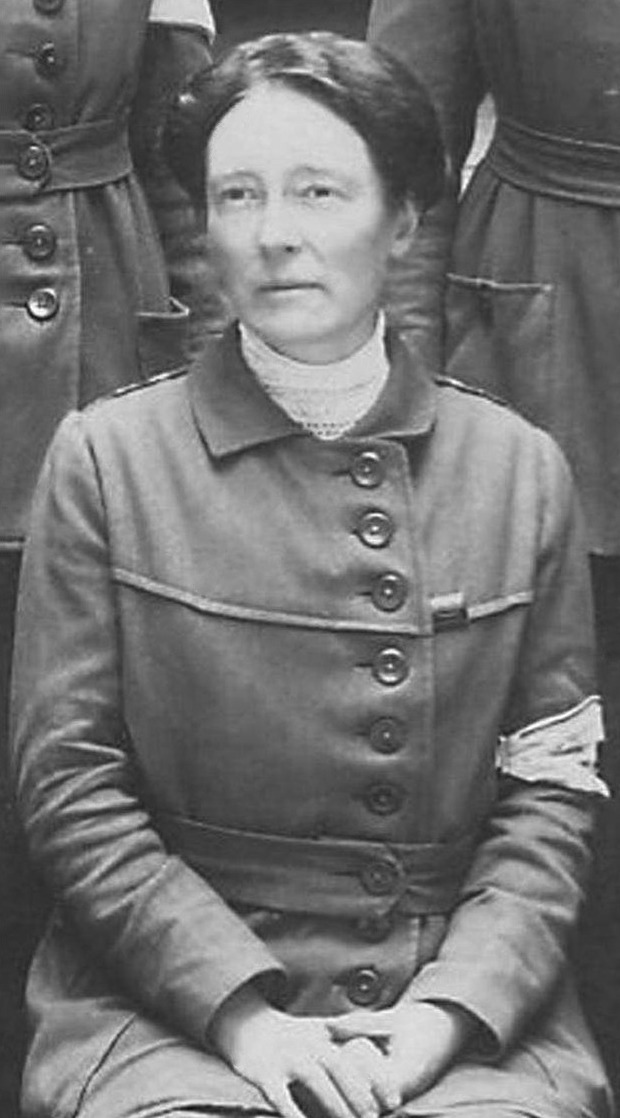
- Louisa Garrett Anderson in 1914
  Alice Abadam (1856–1940) – Welsh suffragist and Catholic campaigner, member of the Catholic Women's Suffrage Society
- Wilhelmina Hay Abbott (1884–1957) – Scottish suffragist, editor and feminist lecturer, officer of the International Woman Suffrage Alliance
- Eleanor Acland (1878–1933) – British Liberal Party politician, suffragist, and novelist, member of the Liberal Women’s Suffrage Union and president of the Women's Liberal Federation
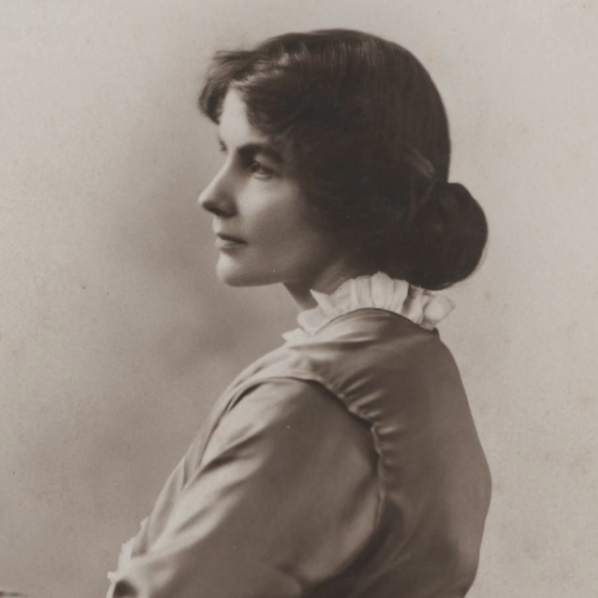
- Violet Aitken c. 1910
  Violet Aitken (1886–1987) – British suffragette activist in the Women's Social and Political Union (WSPU), imprisoned and force-fed, editor of The Suffragette
- Laura Ainsworth (1885–1958) – British teacher and suffragette
- Leonora de Alberti (1870–1934) – English historian and suffragist, member of the Catholic Women’s Suffrage Society and editor of its journal The Catholic Suffragist
- Margaret Aldersley (1852–1940) – British textile worker, suffragist, feminist and trade unionist, member of the National Union of Women's Suffrage Societies (NUWSS)
- Mary Ann Aldham (1858–1940) – English suffragette who famously slashed a portrait in the Royal Academy in 1914, member of the WSPU
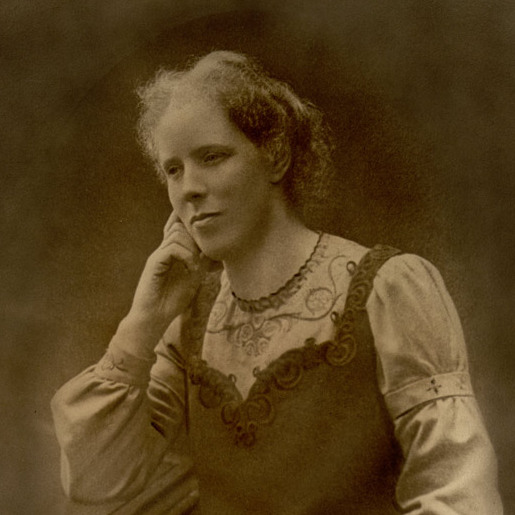
  Rhoda Anstey c. 1900
- Janie Allan (1868–1968) – Scottish suffragette activist and significant financial supporter of the WSPU; imprisoned for suffrage activities
- Doreen Allen (1879–1963) – English suffragette, member of the WSPU
- Mary Sophia Allen (1878–1964) – British women's rights activist, suffragette, and policewoman, member of the WSPU, was imprisoned and went on hunger strike, later involved in far-right political activity
- Katharine Russell, Viscountess Amberley (1844–1874) – British suffragist and early advocate of birth control, president of the Bristol and West of England Women's Suffrage Society
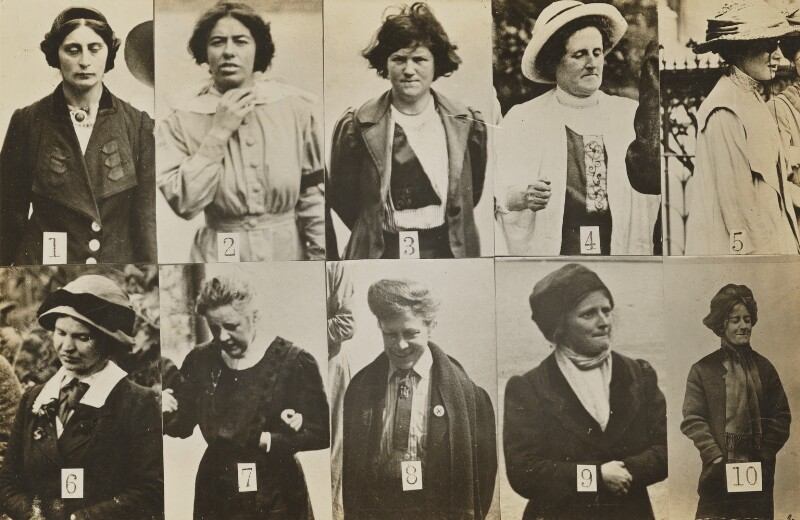
- Militant suffragettes identified by the Criminal Record Office, with images including Gertrude Ansell, Olive Hockin, Evelyn Manesta, Margaret Scott, and others
  Elizabeth Garrett Anderson (1836–1917) – English physician, feminist, first dean of a British medical school, first female mayor, and magistrate in Britain, member of the committee of the NUWSS
- Louisa Garrett Anderson (1873–1943) – British physician and suffragist, Chief Surgeon of Women's Hospital Corps, Fellow of the Royal Society of Medicine, jailed for her suffragist activities; niece of Millicent Fawcett
- Gertrude Ansell (1861–1932) – English suffragette, animal welfare activist, typist and businesswoman
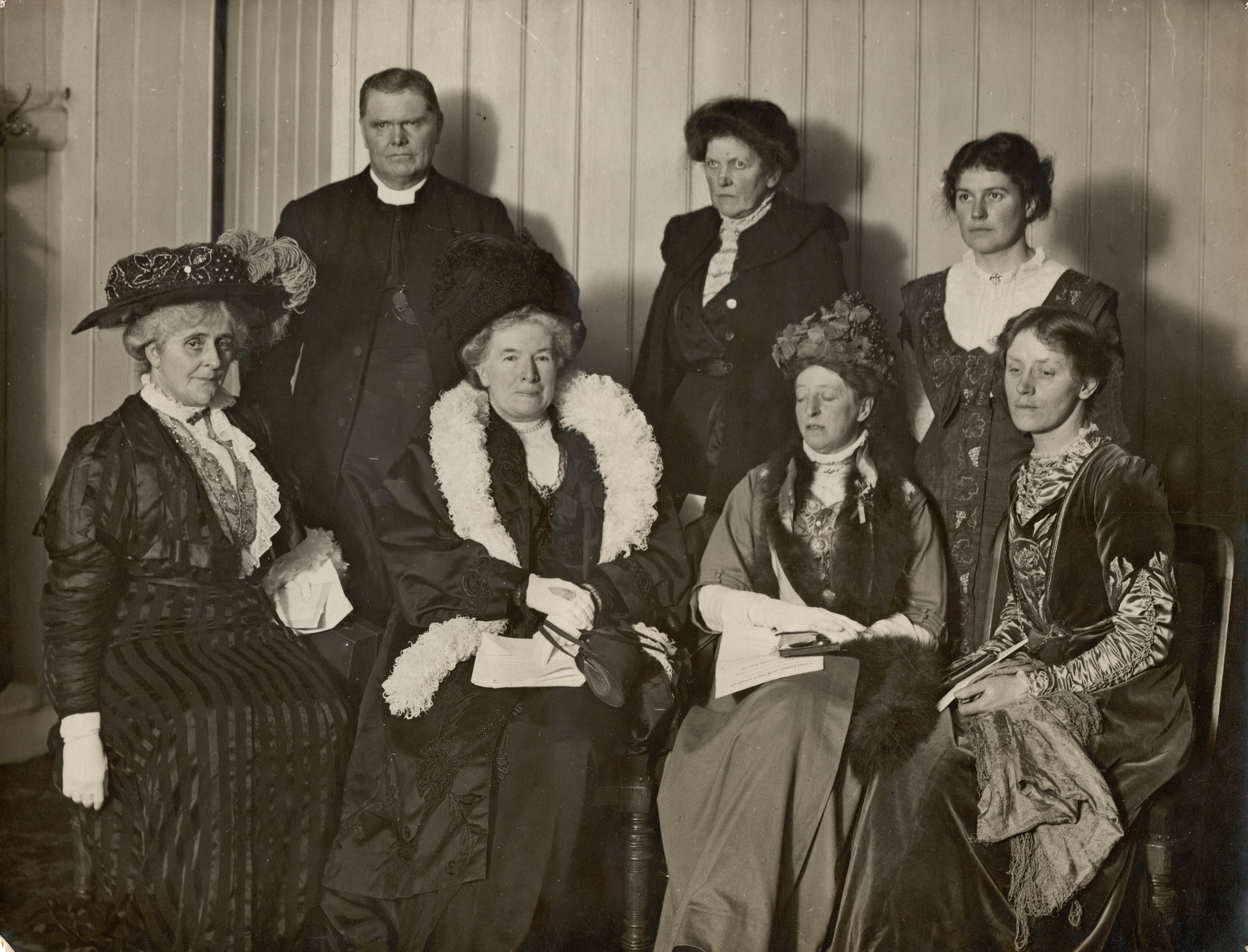
- Debate between suffrage and anti-suffrage societies held at the Free Trade Hall, Manchester in 1909; suffragists include Margaret Ashton and Helena Swanwick
  Rhoda Anstey (1865–1936) – English teacher, member of the WFL and one of the earliest members of the Gymnastic Teachers' Suffrage Society
- Helen Archdale (1876–1949) – Scottish suffragette and journalist, organiser for the WSPU in Sheffield
- Ethel Arnold (1865–1930) – English journalist and suffrage lecturer
- Catherine Arnott (1858–1942) – British medical doctor and member of the Coventry branch of the WSPU
- Jane Arthur (1827–1907) – Scottish philanthropist, educationalist, feminist and activist; campaigned for women's suffrage
- Margaret Ashton (1856–1937) – Scottish suffragist, local politician, pacifist
- Anne Ashworth (1842–1921) – British suffragist and a founder member of the National Society for Women's Suffrage, Edinburgh National Society for Women's Suffrage, and Manchester Society for Women's Suffrage
- Mary Atkinson – English suffragette in the Lancashire textile industry, member of the Nelson & Clitheroe Suffrage Society
- Barbara Ayrton-Gould (1886–1950) – Labour politician and co-founder of the United Suffragists; jailed for her suffrage activities
- Hertha Ayrton (1854–1923) – English engineer, mathematician, inventor and suffragette, member of the WSPU

=== B ===
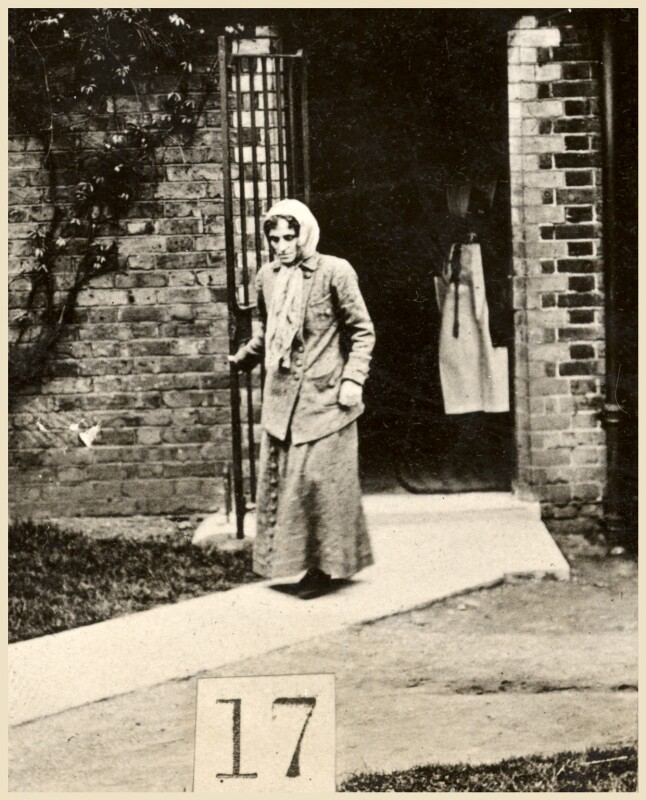
- Sarah Jane Baines in prison, taken by the Criminal Record Office in 1914
  Bertha Bacon (1866–1922) – English suffragette, arrested and imprisoned for smashing three windows of the dining room at the Westminster Palace Hotel
- Mary Anne Baikie (1861–1950) – Scottish suffragist who established the Orcadian Women's Suffrage Society
- Sarah Jane Baines (1866–1951) – British-Australian feminist and social reformer; member of the WSPU, jailed at least fifteen times
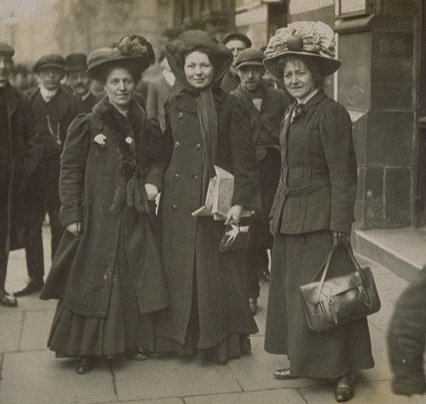
  Minnie Baldock, Christabel Pankhurst and Edith New in 1906
- Minnie Baldock (c. 1864 – 1954) – English suffragette, co-founded the first London branch of the WSPU in Canning Town, one of the first suffragettes to be arrested after trying to present a petition to the House of Commons
- Elizabeth Balfour, Countess of Balfour (1867–1942) – English aristocrat, politician and suffragette
- Frances Balfour
  Lady Frances Balfour (1858–1931) – British aristocrat, author, and suffragist, president of the NUWSS, opposed the militancy of the WSPU
- Florence Balgarnie (1856–1928) – English suffragette, speaker, pacifist, feminist, temperance activist
- Norah Balls (1886–1980) – British suffragette, women’s right campaigner, magistrate and councillor, co-founder of the Girl Guides movement in Northumberland
- Anna, Lady Barlow (1873–1965) – English Liberal Party politician, pacifist, suffragist and temperance activist
- Catherine Isabella Barmby – English socialist and feminist writer, her 1843 tract The Demand for the Emancipation of Women, Politically and Socially was an early work arguing the case for women's enfranchisement
- Annie Barnes (1886–1982) – British-Italian socialist and suffragist, known as "Tough Annie"
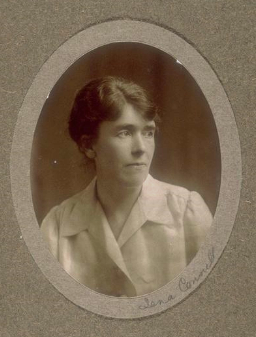
- Rachel Barrett
  Rachel Barrett (1874–1953) – Welsh suffragette and newspaper editor, member of the WSPU, imprisoned and force fed, editor of the Votes for Women newspaper
- Janet Barrowman (1879–1955) – Scottish suffragette and member of the WSPU, jailed for her suffragist activities
- Anna Bateson (c.1830–1918) – English suffragist, co-founder of the Cambridge Women’s Suffrage Association (CWSA)
- Lydia Becker (1827–1890) – English amateur scientist and leader in the early British suffrage movement, secretary of the Manchester Society for Women's Suffrage
- Dorothea Beale (1831–1906) – English educational reformer, author and suffragist, Principal of the Cheltenham Ladies' College and vice-president of the Kensington Society
- Harriette Beanland (born 1866) – British textile worker and suffragette, secretary to the Women's Labour League in Lancashire, signed the manifesto of the Independent Labour Party in favour of women's suffrage in 1906
- Lydia Becker (1827–1890) – British biologist, astronomer and suffragist, founder and publisher of the Women's Suffrage Journal
- Edith Marian Begbie (1866–1932) – Scottish militant suffragette who was force-fed, member of the WSPU
- Elizabeth Gould Bell (1862–1934) – Northern Irish suffragette, member of the WSPU and the Irish Women's Suffrage Society, and the first woman to practice medicine in Ulster
- Mary Bell (1885–1943) – first Scottish women magistrate, member of the Women's Freedom League (WFL)
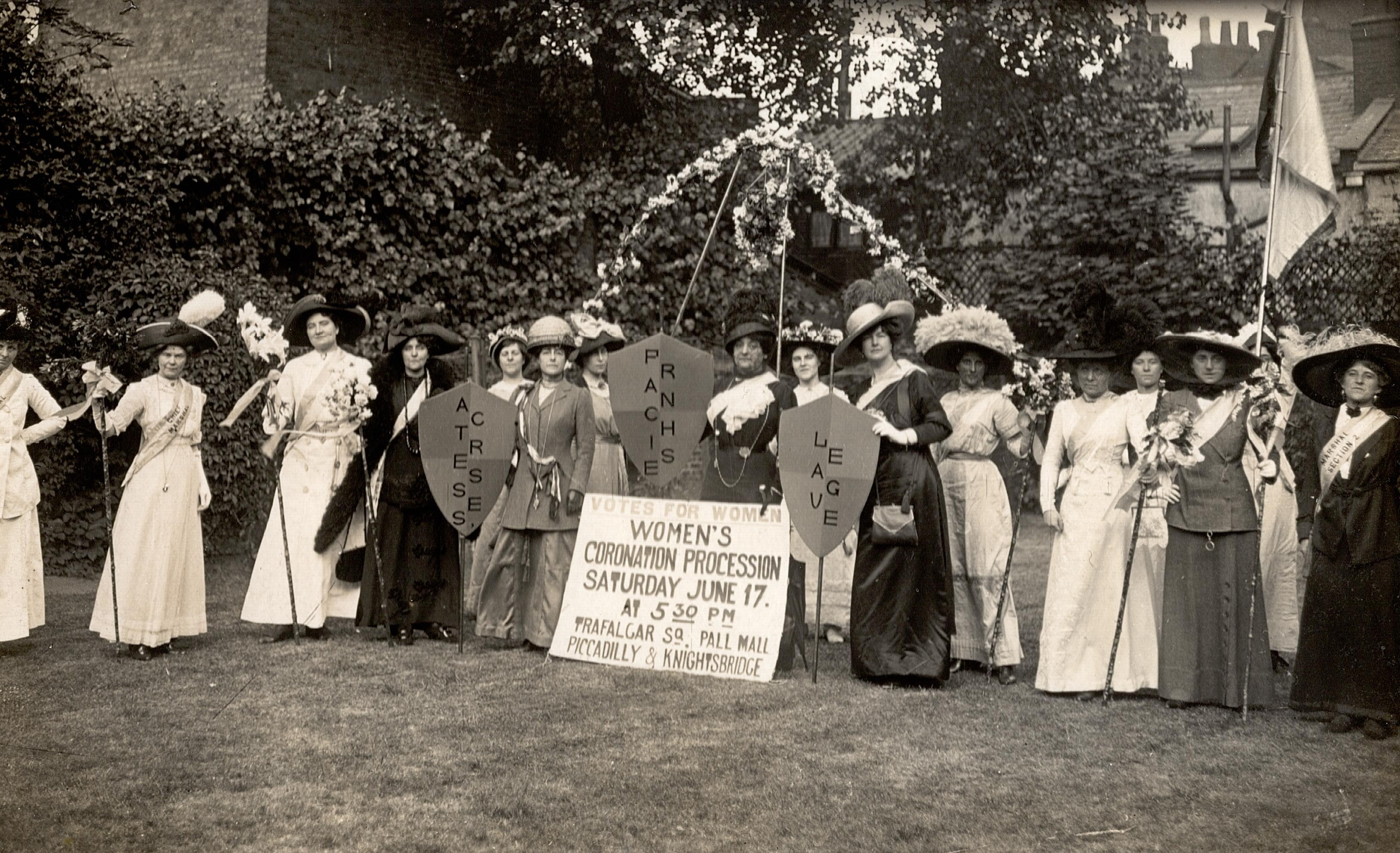
- Members of the Actresses Franchise League (AFL) at the Women's Coronation Procession in 1911
  Sarah Benett (1850–1924) – Scottish suffragette and tax resister, member of the WSPU and treasurer of the WFL
- Ethel Bentham (1861–1931) – British doctor, Labour politician, member of the NUWSS
- Inez Bensusan (1871–1967) – Australian born Jewish actress, playwright and suffragette in the UK, leader of the Actresses' Franchise League (AFL) and the Jewish League for Woman Suffrage
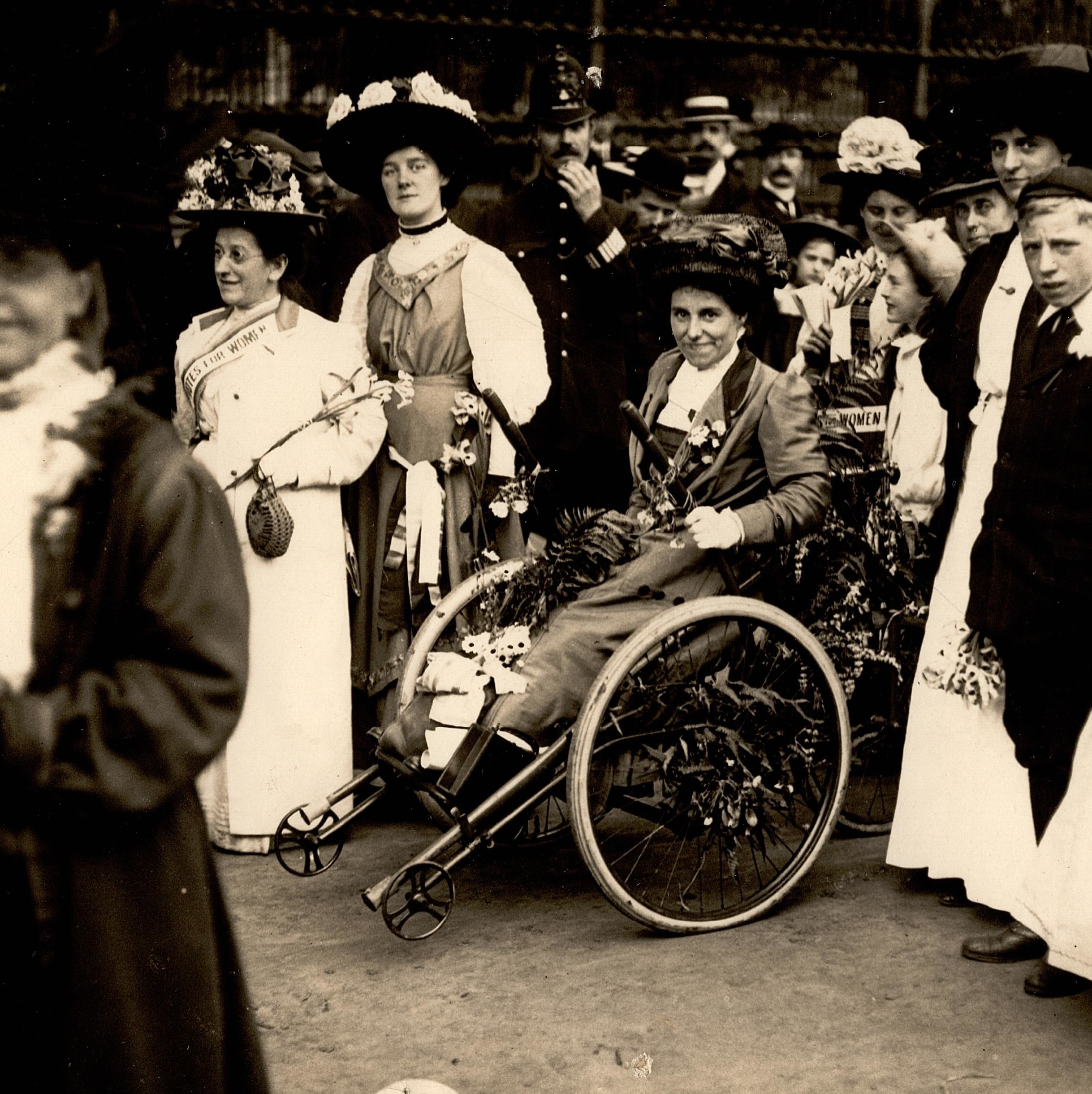
  Rosa May Billinghurst demonstrating in her wheelchair
- Rosa May Billinghurst (1875–1953) – British suffragette, member of the WSPU and founder of the Greenwich branch; jailed multiple times, decorated her wheelchair in WSPU colours
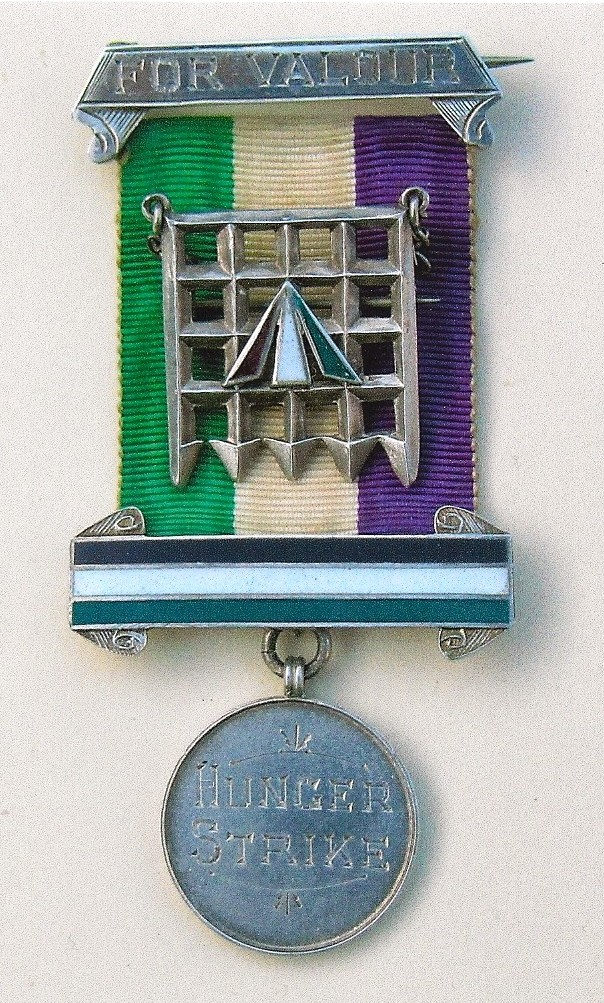
  Violet Ann Bland's Hunger Strike Medal and Holloway Brooch
- Teresa Billington-Greig (1877–1964) – British writer, suffragette and co-founder of the WFL; jailed for her campaigning activities
- Catherine Hogg Blair (1872–1946) – Scottish suffragette, founder of the Scottish Women's Rural Institute (SWRI) and member of the WSPU
- Clementina Black (1853–1922) – English writer, suffragist and trade unionist, member of the WSPU and acting editor of The Common Cause newspaper
- Violet Bland (1863–1940) – member of the WSPU, force-fed in prison
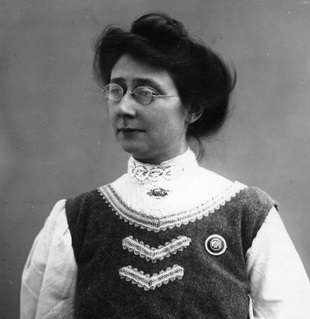
- Mary Blathwayt in 1909
  Emily Blathwayt (1852–1940) – English suffragist who lived at Eagle House, which became known as the "Suffragette's Rest"
- Mary Blathwayt (1879–1961) – English suffragist who lived at Eagle House, member of the WSPU, daughter of Emily Blathwayt
- Barbara Bodichon (1827–1891) – early English educationalist, artist, feminist, activist for women's rights, belonged to the Langham Place Circle
- Lillie Boileau (1869–1930) – English political activist and early member of the WFL and the Union of Ethical Societies
- Margaret Bondfield (1873–1953) – British feminist and politician, chair of the Adult Suffrage Society, member of the WFL, member of the National Union of Societies for Equal Citizenship (later the NUWSS) and first woman Cabinet minister in the United Kingdom
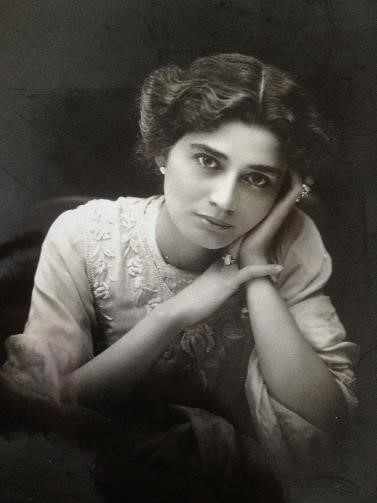
- Adeline Bourne
  Adeline Bourne (1873–1965) – Anglo-Indian actress, suffragette and charity worker; co-founder or the AFL
- Elsie Bowerman (1889–1973) – British lawyer and suffragette, member of the WSPU, RMS Titanic survivor
- Emma Boyce (1867–1929) – Hackney-based suffragette and anti-war activist, member of the East London Federation of Suffragettes
- Janet Boyd (1850–1928) – English suffragette and hunger-striker
- Georgina Brackenbury (1865–1949) – British painter and suffragette
- Marie Brackenbury (1866–1950) – British painter and suffragette, her home was known as "Mouse Castle" because it looked after recovering hunger strikers
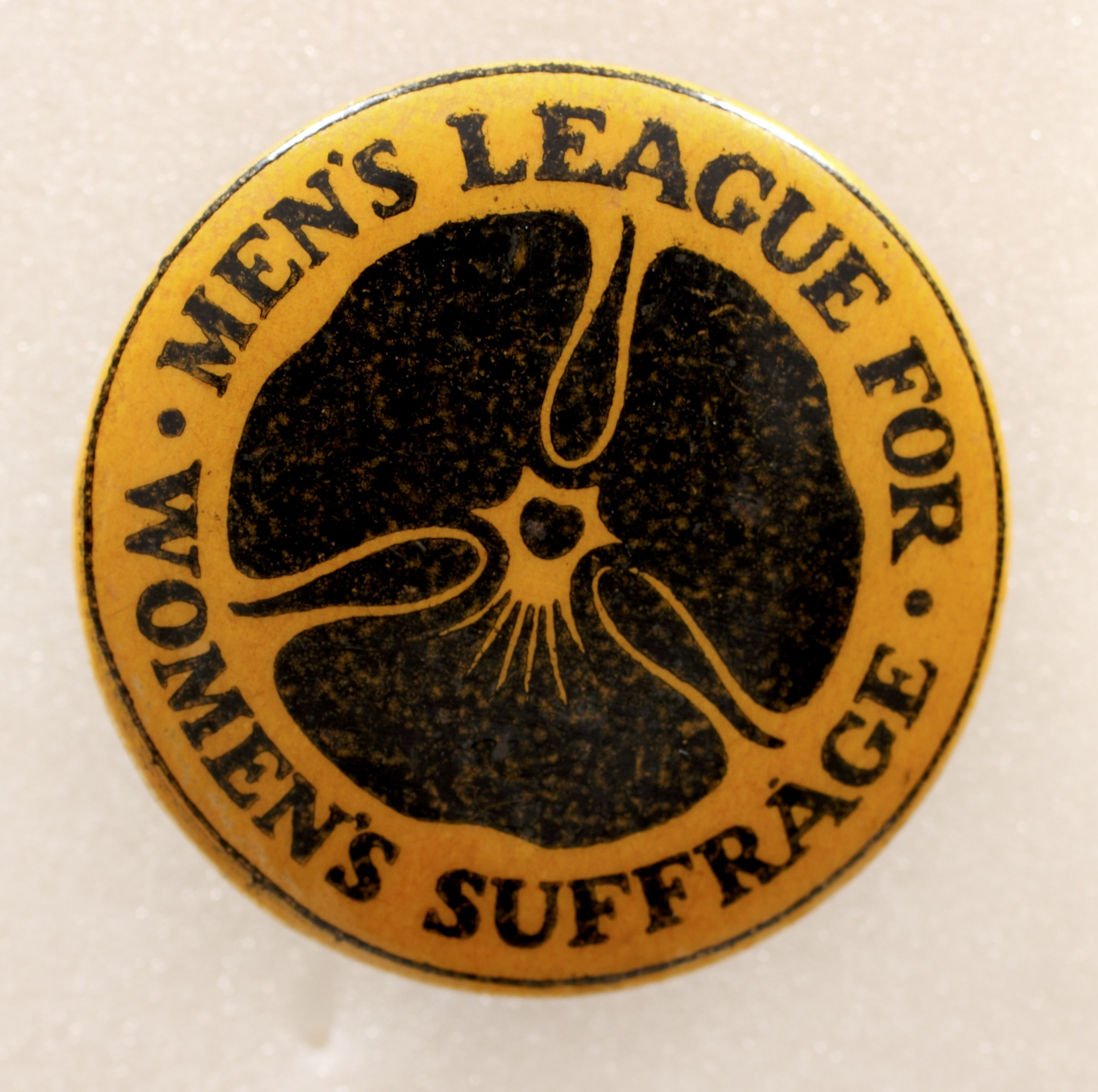
- Men's League for Women's Suffrage badge
  Henry Brailsford (1873–1958) – English journalist and writer, cofounder of the Men's League for Women's Suffrage
- Jane Esdon Brailsford (1876–1937) – Scottish suffragette, member of the WSPU
- Bertha Brewster (1887–1959) – English peace activist and suffragette, member of the WSPU then the United Suffragists
- Ursula Bright (1835–1915) – English suffragist and activist for married women's property rights, a founder member of the Manchester Society for Women's Suffrage in 1867
- Maud Mary Brindley – English artist and suffragette, member of the WSPU, arrested for breaking windows on London's Oxford Street
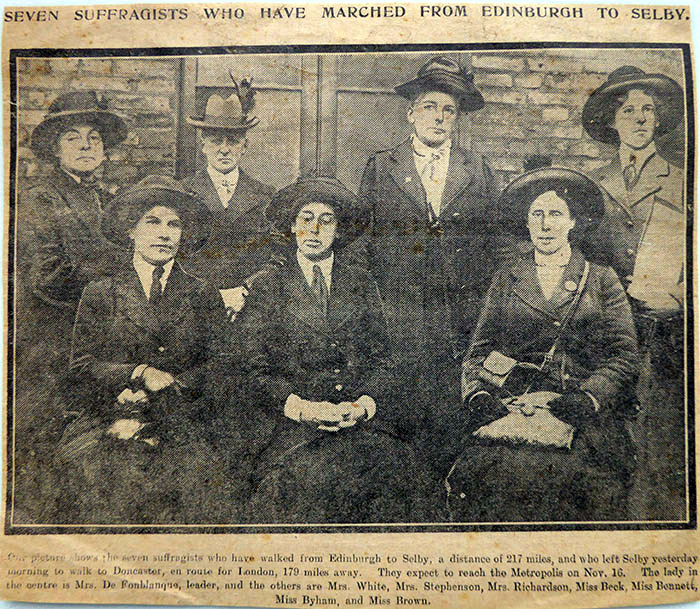
- Newspaper report on the suffrage march from Edinburgh to London, women pictured include Sarah Benett, Agnes Brown and Florence Gertrude de Fonblanque
  Agnes Brown (1866–1943) – Scottish suffragist and writer, member of the WFL and secretary of Northern Men's Federation for Women's Suffrage
- Myra Sadd Brown (1872–1938) – English suffragette activist in the WSPU, imprisoned and force-fed after breaking a window at the War Office
- Annie Leigh Browne (1851–1936) – British educationist and suffragist, co-founder of College Hall, London and the Women's Local Government Society
- Millicent Browne (1881–1975) – British suffragette, pacifist and teacher, nickname "Militant Browne"
- Constance Bryer (1870–1952) – British classical violinist and suffragette, member of the WSPU and the Church League for Women's Suffrage (CLWS), served four months in prison for breaking windows on London’s Regent Street
- Amy Bull (1877–1953) – British teacher, suffragist and tax resister, arrested on Black Friday
- Lady Constance Bulwer-Lytton (1869–1923) – British suffragette, speaker and campaigner for prison reform, votes for women, and birth control
- Evaline Hilda Burkitt (1876–1955) – English suffragette, member of the WSPU, first suffragette to be force-fed
- Frances Buss (1827–1894) – British educator, headmistress and feminist, pioneer of women's education, member of the Kensington Society
- Josephine Butler (1828–1906) – English feminist, author, social reformer concerned about the welfare of prostitutes
- Mary Burton (1819–1909) – Scottish social and educational reformer, and supporter of the Edinburgh National Society for Women's Suffrage
- Mary Bury – English suffragist, secretary of the Newcastle Suffrage Society and organiser for the NUWSS in northern England and Scotland

=== C ===
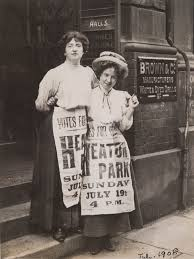
- Patricia Woodlock and Mabel Capper in 1908
  Elizabeth Cadbury (1858–1951) – British philanthropist and suffragist
- Edward Caird (1835–1908) – Scottish philosopher, founder member of the Glasgow and West of Scotland Association for Women's Suffrage
- Mona Caird (1854–1932) – English novelist and essayist who wrote in support of women's suffrage, member of the NUWSS, WFL, the Women's Emancipation Union (WEU), the London Society for Women's Suffrage and the Theosophical Society
- Florence Canning (1863–1914) – British suffragette, chair of the executive committee of the Church League for Women's Suffrage
- Mabel Capper (1888–1966) – English journalist and suffragette, activist for the WSPU; imprisoned many times, and force-fed
- Isabella Carrie (1878–1981) – Scottish suffragette, schoolteacher and safe house keeper for the WSPU
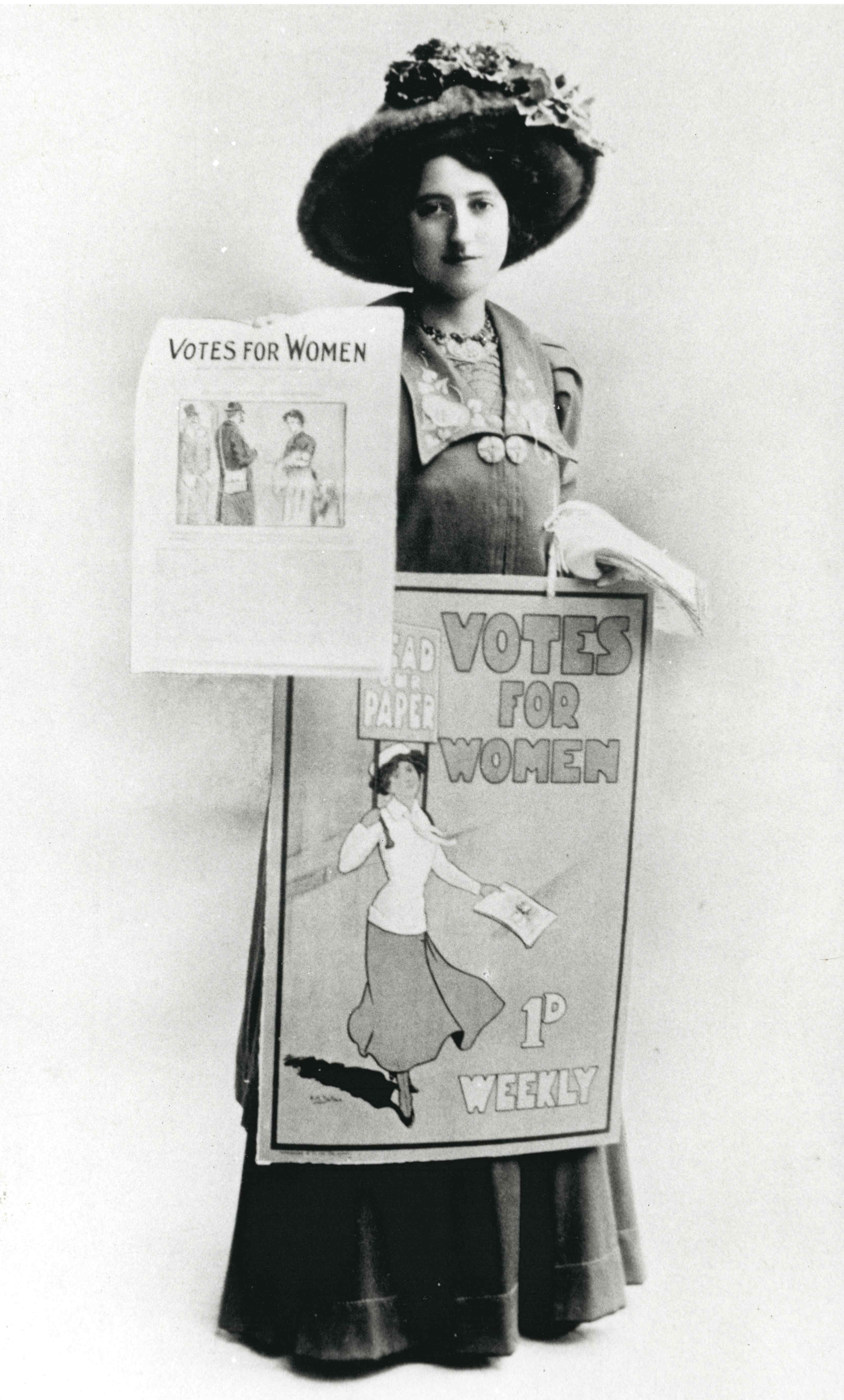
- Grace Chappelow selling the Votes for Women newspaper
  Joan Cather (1882–1967) – British suffragette awarded the Hunger Strike Medal, honorary propaganda secretary of the Church League for Women's Suffrage
- Dorothea Chalmers Smith (1874–1944) – Scottish doctor and suffragist
- Adeline Chapman (1847–1931) – English suffragist and founding president of the New Constitutional Society for Women's Suffrage (NCS)
- Ellen Chapman – English suffragist and local politician, and the first woman councillor for Worthing, founder and president of the Worthing Women's Franchise Society, member of the Catholic Women's Suffrage Society, member of the NUWSS and member of the CUWFA
- Grace Chappelow (1884–1971) – English suffragette, member of the WSPU, arrested for window smashing
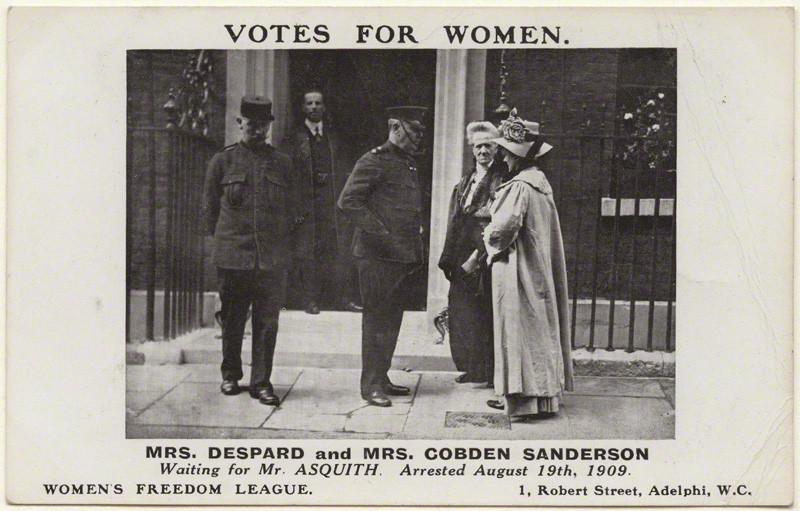
  Anne Cobden-Sanderson and Charlotte Despard at 10 Downing Street, shortly before their 1909 arrest
- Georgina Fanny Cheffins (1863–1932) – suffragette arrested for window smashing, held in HM Prison Holloway, force-fed
- Ada Nield Chew (1870–1945) – British socialist and suffragist organiser
- Rosalie Chichester (1865–1949) – British landowner, photographer, artist, writer and suffragist
- Jane Clapperton (1832–1914) – British philosopher, birth control pioneer, social reformer and suffragist, member of the Edinburgh Women's Suffrage Society, WSPU and WFL
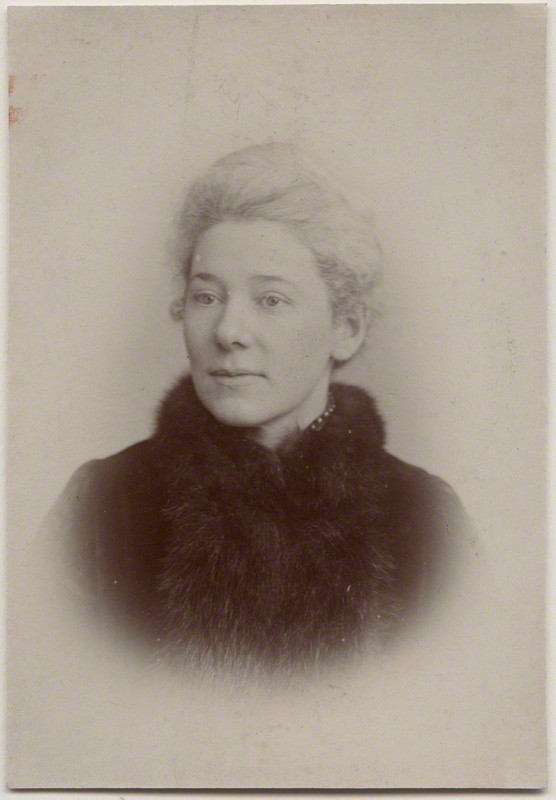
- Jane Cobden
  Alice Clark (1874–1934) – served on the executive committee of the National Union of Women's Suffrage Societies, daughter of Helen Priestman Bright
- Mary Jane Clarke (1862–1910) – British suffragette arrested for window smashing, held in HM Prison Holloway and force-fed, sister of suffragette leader Emmeline Pankhurst
- Lila Clunas (1876–1968) – Scottish suffragette and Labour party councillor
- Anne Cobden-Sanderson (1853–1926) – English socialist and suffragette
- Jane Cobden (1851–1947) – Liberal politician who was active in many radical causes; treasurer for the NUWSS and co-founder of the Women's Franchise League (WFL)
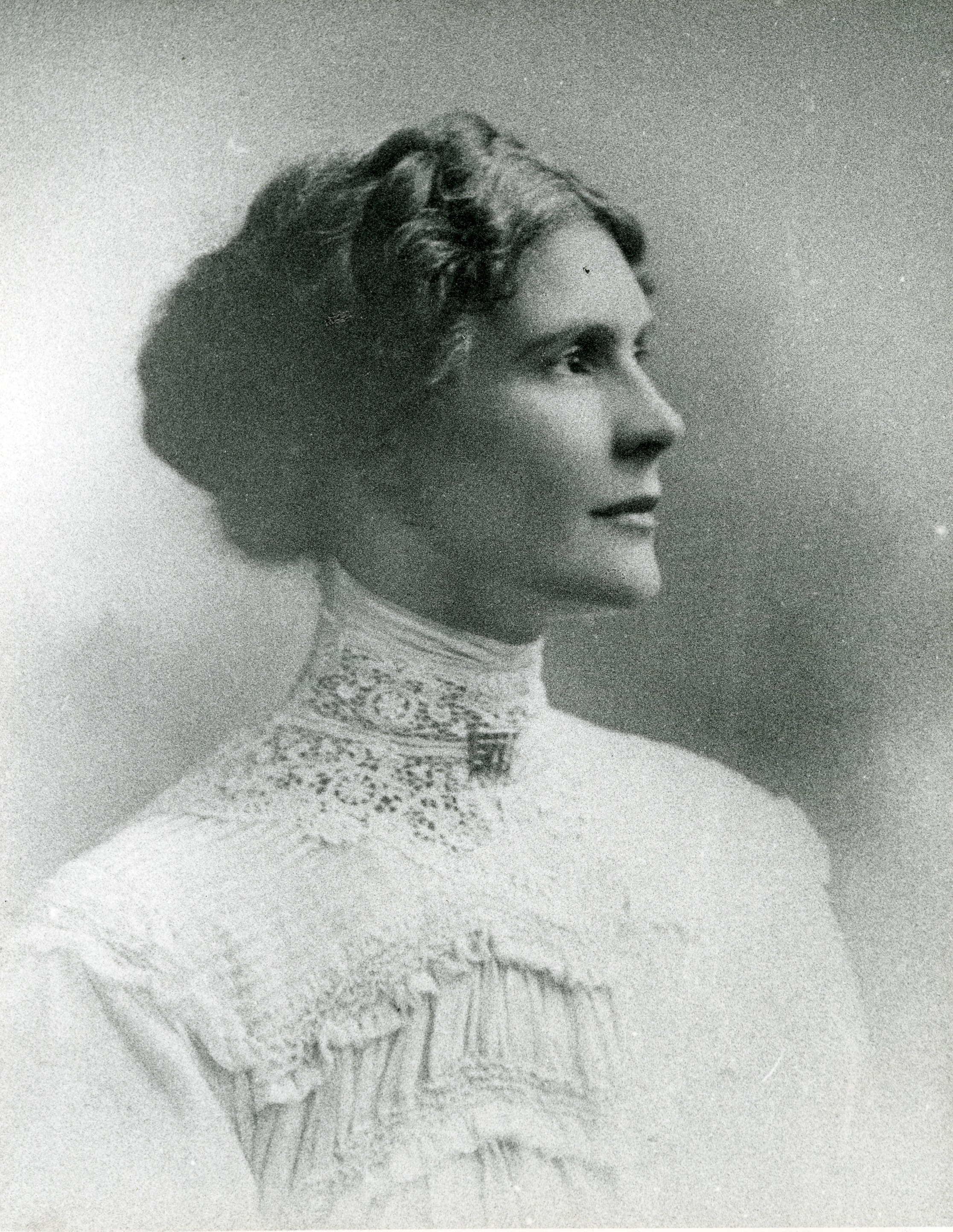
- Leonora Cohen
  Ellen Melicent Cobden (1848–1914) – writer and activist who donated funds to the WSPU and participated in the Women’s Suffrage Procession, organized by the Women’s Freedom League
- Clara Codd – British writer, suffragette, socialist feminist and theosophist, member of the NUWSS then WSPU
- Leonora Cohen (1873–1978) – British militant suffragette and trade unionist; bodyguard for Emmeline Pankhurst
- Maria Colby – English suffragist; member of the Bristol and West of England Society for Women’s Suffrage and WSPU
- Mary Collin (1860–1955) – English teacher and suffragist, chair of the Cardiff and District Women's Suffrage Society
- Florence Annie Conybeare (1872–1916) – British activist, campaigned in support of women's suffrage, organized a meeting of the NUWSS
- Selina Cooper (1864–1946) – Suffragist, textile mill worker, local magistrate, member of the North of England Society for Women's Suffrage
- Catherine Corbett (1869–1950) – British suffragette; jailed and went on hunger strike
- Annie Coultate (1856–1931) – teacher and founder of the local WSPU branch in York
- Ethel Cox (born 1888) – British suffragette who smashed windows at the house of the home secretary
- Isabel Cowe (1867–1931) – Scottish suffragist who helped organise the 400-mile Scottish Suffrage March from Edinburgh to Downing Street, London to present a petition for women's enfranchisement
- Annie Walker Craig (1864–1948) – British suffragette involved in rock-throwing and arson in England and Scotland
- Jessie Craigen (c. 1835 – 1899) – British working-class suffragist who gave speeches across the country
- Muriel Craigie (1889–1971) – Scottish suffragist, and wartime volunteer organiser
- Virginia Mary Crawford (1862–1948) – British Catholic suffragist, journalist and author, a co-founder of the Catholic Women's Suffrage Society
- Helen Crawfurd (1877–1954) – Scottish suffragette, rent strike organiser and communist activist
- Rose Mary Crawshay (1828–1907) – British philanthropist, vice president of the Bristol and West of England National Society for Women's Suffrage
- Nellie Cressall (1882–1973) – East End suffragette and labour activist
- Maud Crofts (born 1889) – British suffragist, author and first woman accepted as a solicitor
- Richmal Crompton (1890–1969) – English schoolmistress, writer and suffragist
- Mary Crudelius (1839–1877) – early supporter of women's suffrage and campaigner for women's education; a founder of the Edinburgh Association for the University Education of Women
- Helen Cruickshank (1886–1975) – Scottish poet and suffragette, member of the WSPU
- Jessie Landale Cumberland (1861–1935) – British suffragette, awarded the Hunger Strike Medal

=== D ===
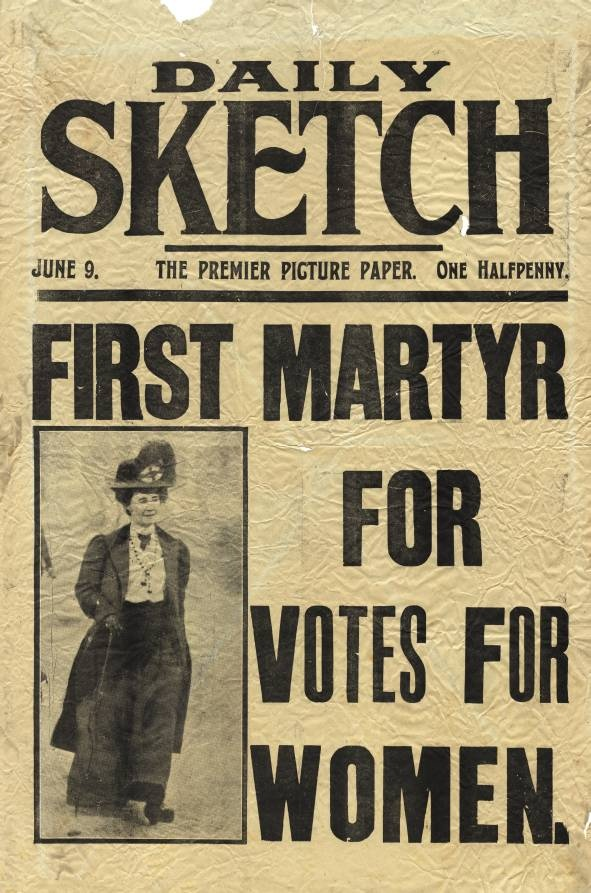
- Front page of the Daily Sketch on 9 June 1913, reporting the death of Emily Wilding Davison
  Emily Davies (1830–1921) – English suffragist, co-founder of Kensington Society and Britain's first women's college, Girton College, Cambridge
- Emily Wilding Davison (1872–1913) – English teacher and militant suffragette activist, key member of the WSPU, died in a protest action at Epsom racetrack
- Margaret Davidson (suffragist) (1879–1978) – Scottish educator, suffragist, volunteer war nurse, and early leader of the Girl Guides
- Helena Deneke – British academic and suffragist, member of the Oxford Women Students' Society for Women's Suffrage (OWSSWS) and treasurer of the NUWSS
- John McAusland Denny (1858–1922) – Scottish businessman, Conservative Party politician and founder member of the Glasgow and West of Scotland Association for Women's Suffrage
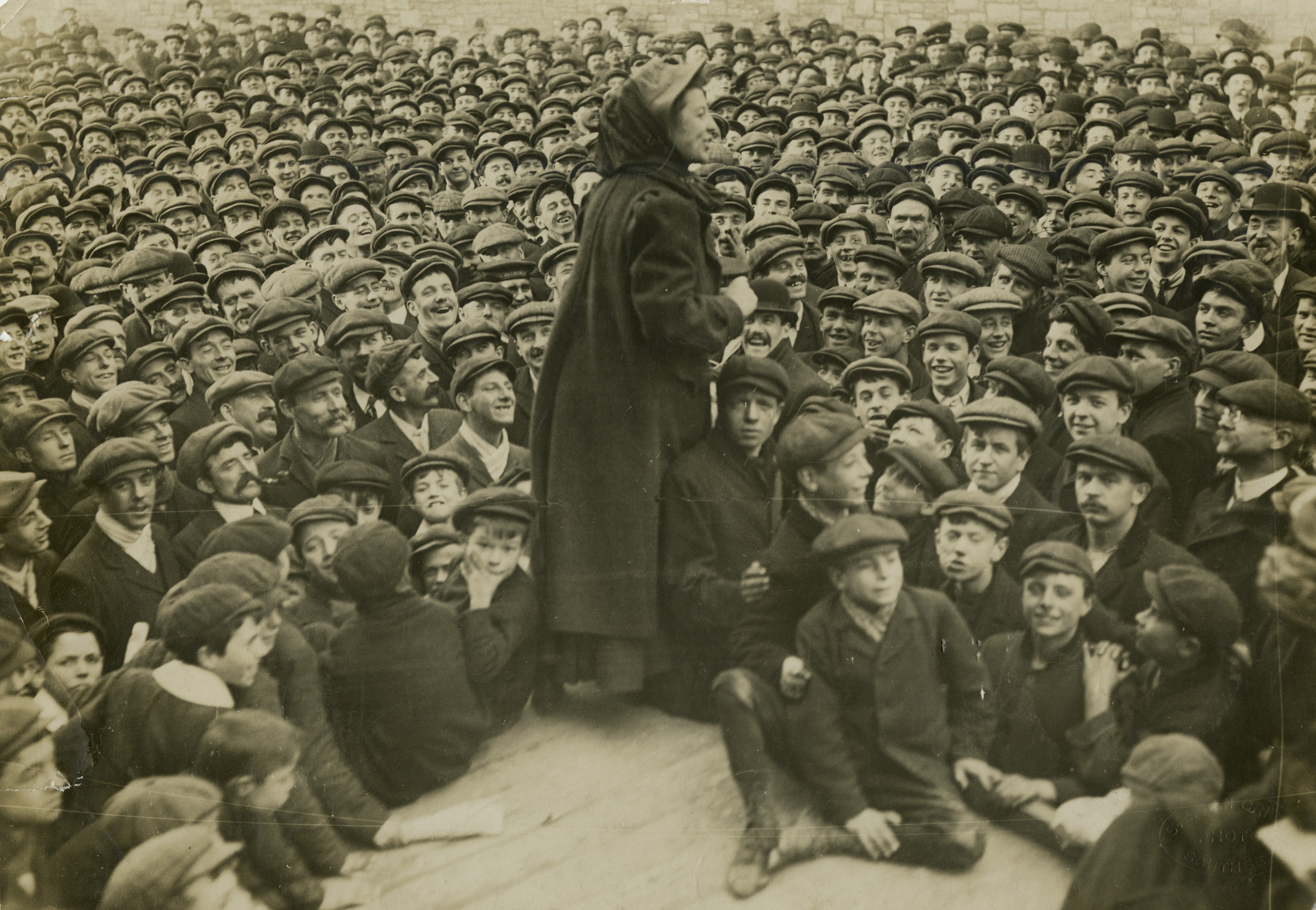
- Katherine Douglas Smith speaking to a crowd of men in Portsmouth
  Charlotte Despard (1844–1939) – Anglo-Irish novelist, Sinn Féin activist, co-founder of the WFL and the Irish Women's Franchise League
- Sarah Dickenson (1868–1954) – British trade unionist and suffragist, member of the Manchester Society for Women's Suffrage (linked to the NUWSS)
- Margaret Dilke (1857–1914) – British writer and suffragist
- Violet Mary Doudney (1889–1952) – teacher and militant suffragette, member of the WSPU and awarded the Hunger Strike Medal
- Katherine Douglas Smith (born 1878) – English suffragette and WSPU organiser
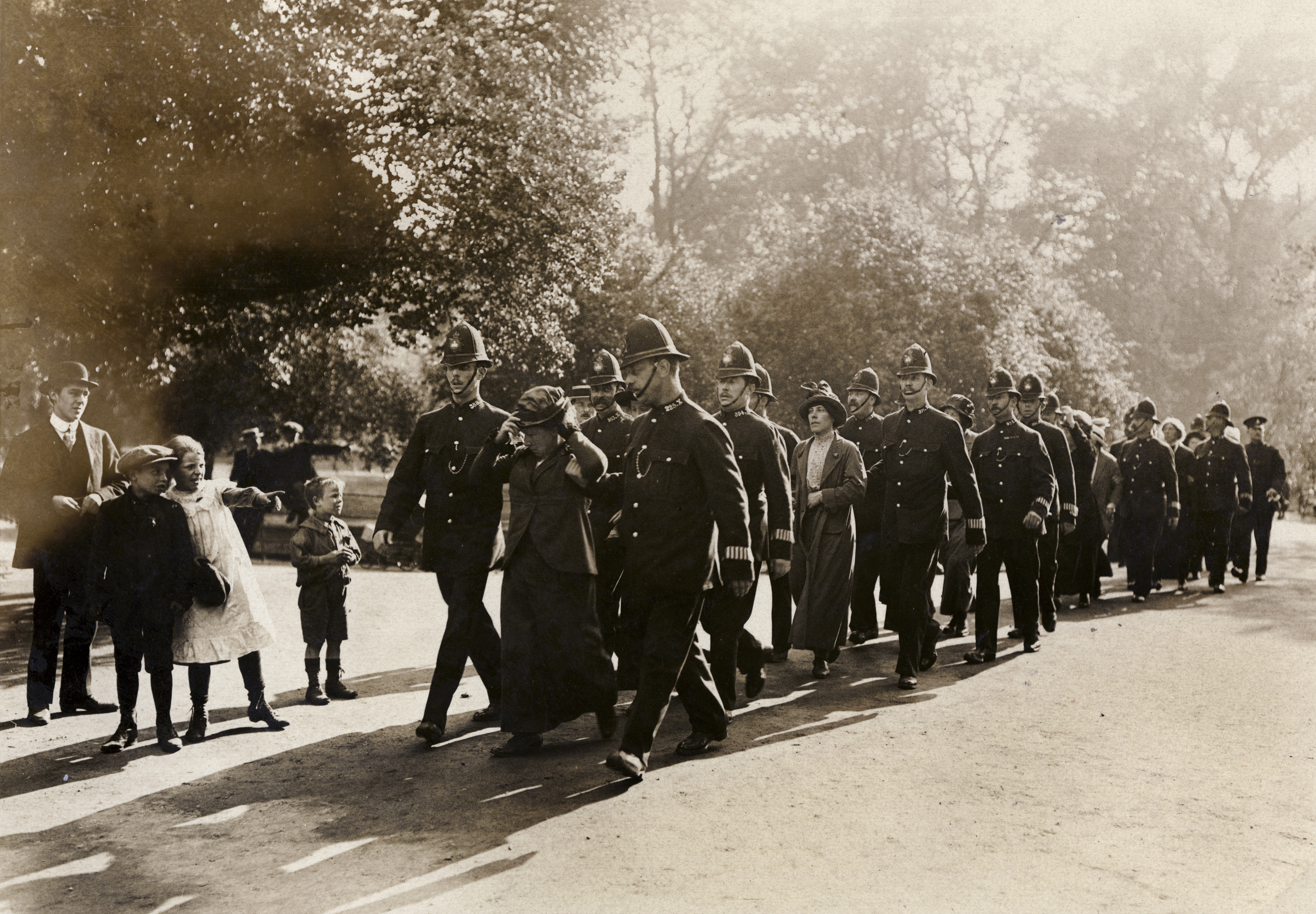
  Flora Drummond and others under arrest in London in 1914
- Lillian Dove-Willcox (1875–1963) – British suffragette who was a member of Emmeline Pankhurst's personal bodyguard
- Caroline Lowder Downing – Welsh suffragette, member of the WSPU
- Edith Downing (1857–1931) – Welsh artist, sculptor and suffragette, member of the WSPU
- Alice Dowson (1844–1927) – Nottingham Activist and Suffragist
- Helena Brownsword Dowson (1866–1964) – Nottingham suffragist, City Councillor and Magistrate
- Hilda Dowson (1844–1927) – Nottingham activist and suffragist
- Maud Dowson (1936–?) – Nottingham suffragist
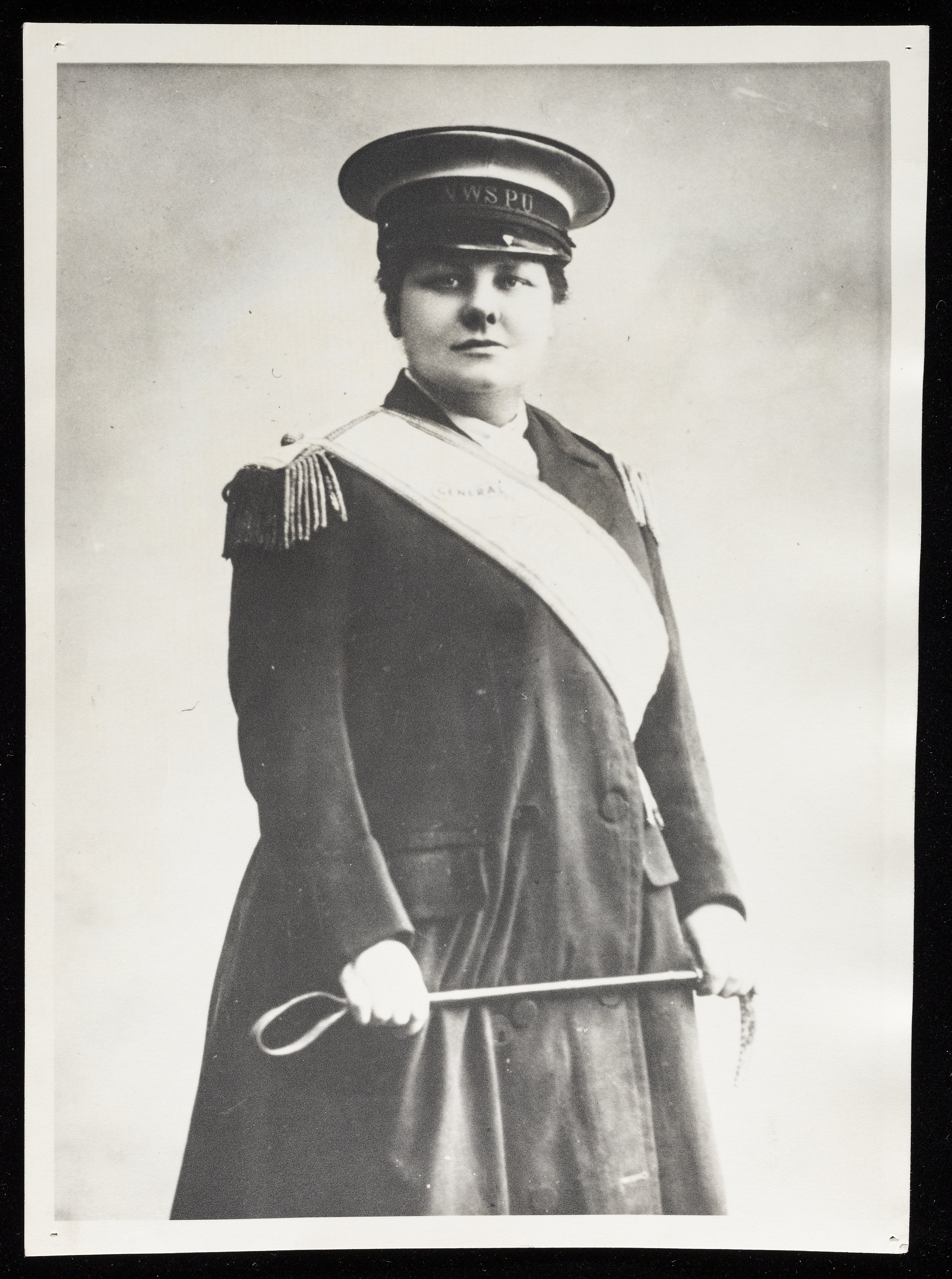
- Flora Drummond c. 1908-1912
  Flora Drummond (1878–1949) – British suffragette, organiser for WSPU, imprisoned nine times for her activism in women's suffrage movement, inspiring orator nicknamed "the General"
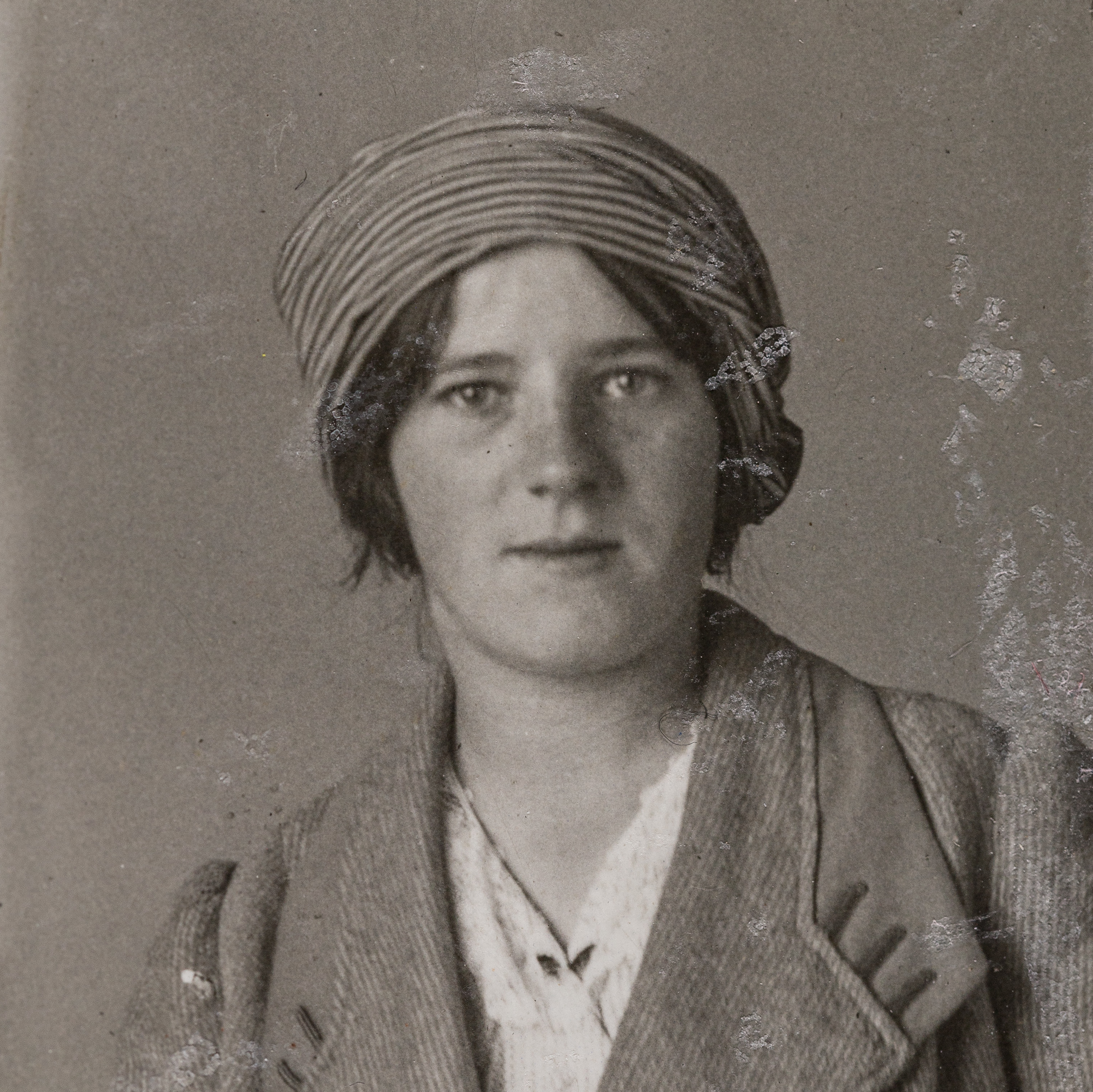
  Elsie Duval
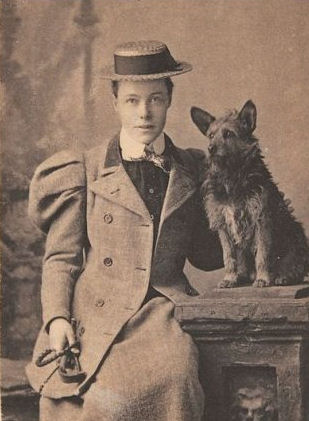
  Kate Williams Evans
- Bessie Drysdale (1871–1950) – member of the WSPU's National Executive Committee, one of the 52 women arrested during a suffragette march to the House of Commons in 1907, and writer for the short lived radical feminist magazine The Freewoman (1911–1913)
- Charles Vickery Drysdale (1874–1961) – one of the founding members of the Men’s League for Women’s Suffrage in 1907
- Marion Wallace Dunlop (1864–1942) – British artist and suffragette
- Lilla Durham (1871–1935) – British musician and suffragette, arrested for window smashing
- Elsie Duval (1892–1919) – English suffragette and member of WSPU, first woman released from prison under the Cat and Mouse Act
- Emily Duval (1860–1924) – English suffragette, member of the WSPU and WFL, participant in the "Grille Incident", mother of Elsie Duval
- Una Duval (1879–1975) – suffragette and marriage reformer, co-founded The Suffragette Fellowship (an organisation to preserve the memory of the militant suffrage struggle), married to Victor Duval
- Victor Duval (1879–1945) – British suffrage activist, founder of the Men's Political Union for Women's Enfranchisement (MPU) in 1910, published the leaflet An Appeal to Men to persuade men to take up the militant struggle for women's suffrage
- Amy Dillwyn – Welsh novelist, businesswoman, suffragist and social benefactor; member of the NUWSS

=== E ===
- Florence Earengey (1877–1963) – British suffragette involved in multiple suffrage organisations; in charge of literature for the Cheltenham branch of the NUWSS
- Louise Eates (1877–1944) – suffragette, chair of Kensington Women's Social and Political Union and a women's education activist
- Gertrude Eaton (1864–1940) – Welsh singer and suffragist
- Maude Edwards (fl. 1914) – Scottish suffragette who was force-fed in prison despite having a heart condition
- Norah Elam (1878–1961) – British suffragette, anti-vivisectionist and prominent member of the WSPU; imprisoned three times
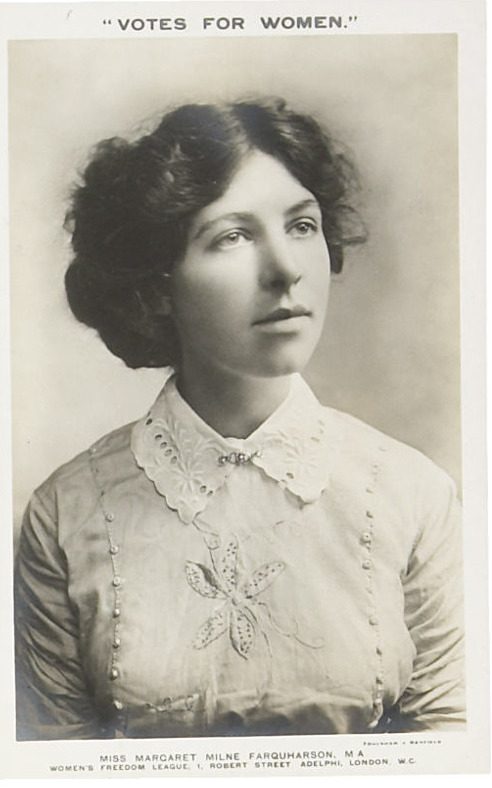
- Margaret Milne Farquharson
  Elizabeth Clarke Wolstenholme Elmy (1833–1918) – public speaker and writer; formed the first British suffragist society, first paid employee of the British Women's Movement
- Alice Embleton (1876–1960) – biologist, zoologist, and suffragist
- Mary Emmott (1866–1954), British political activist, member of the executive of the London Society for Women's Suffrage
- Louisa Entwistle (born 1887) – English suffragette and mill worker
- Mary Estlin (1820–1902) – English abolitionist and social reformer, treasurer of the Bristol Women's Suffrage Society
- Dorothy Evans (1888–1944) – British activist and organiser, worked for WSPU in England and the north of Ireland; imprisoned several times
- Kate Williams Evans (1866–1961) – Welsh suffragette

=== F ===
- Caprina Fahey (1883–1959) – British-Italian suffragette, received the WSPU Hunger Strike Medal "for Valour" in 1914
- Margaret Milne Farquharson (1884–c. 1936) – Scottish suffragette, member of the WFL, MP candidate and leader of the National Political League campaigning for Palestine
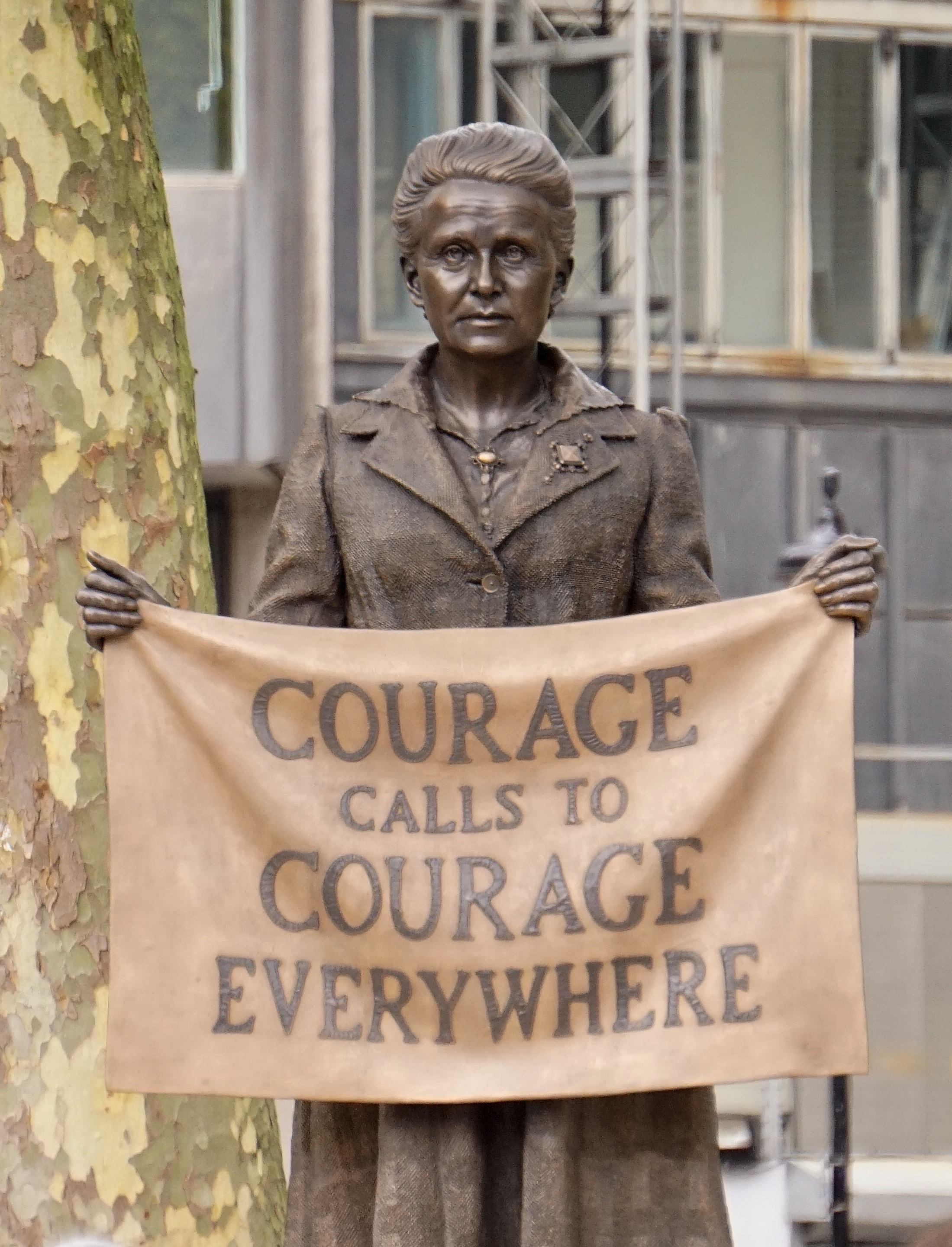
- Statue of Millicent Fawcett in Parliament Square
  Christian Farquharson-Kennedy (1870–1917), Scottish teacher, socialist and suffragist
- Millicent Fawcett (1847–1929) – English feminist, writer, political and union leader; president of the NUWSS
- Florence Feek (1876–1940) – British suffragette and Post Office worker
- Ada Flatman (1876–1952) – English suffragette, employed by the WSPU to organise their activities in Liverpool
- Lettice Floyd (1865–1934) – British suffragette, set up a Berkswell outpost of the Birmingham Women's Suffrage Society and later a full-time paid organiser of the WSPU, imprisoned and went on hunger strike
- Florence Gertrude de Fonblanque (1864–1949) – British suffragist, organiser of the 1912 women's suffrage march from Edinburgh to London
- Isabella Ford (1855–1924) – English social reformer, suffragist and writer
- Lillian Forrester (1879–1973) – British suffragette who led an attack on paintings at Manchester Art Gallery, member of the WSPU
- Hugh Franklin – British suffragist and politician, one of the founding members of the Men’s League for Women’s Suffrage in 1907
- Helen Fraser (1881–1979) – Scottish suffragist, speaker and artist, member of the WSPU
- Elizabeth Fry (1780–1845) – English prison reformer, social reformer, philanthropist

=== G ===
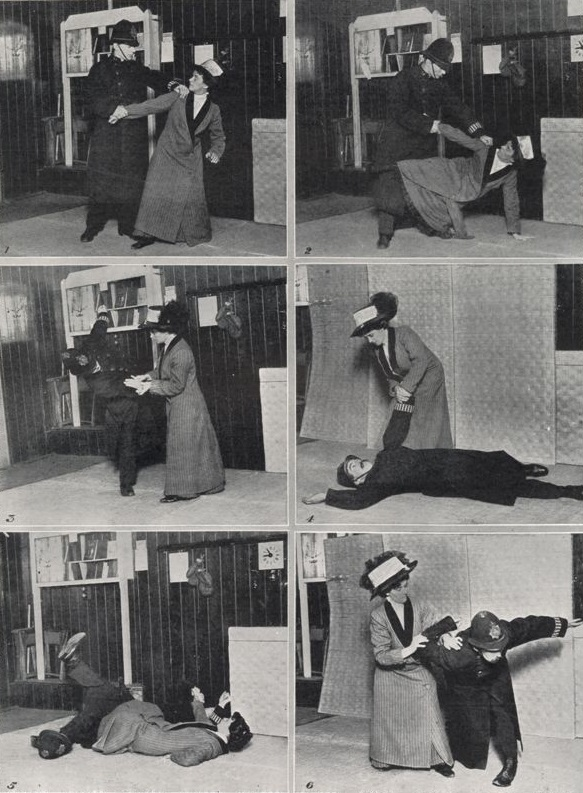
- Edith Garrud and a volunteer dressed as a policeman practicing suffrajitsu
  Rhoda Garrett (1841–1882) – English interior designer and suffragist
- Theresa Garnett (1888–1966) – British suffragette and member of the WSPU, attacked the President of the Board of Trade and chained herself to a statue in the Houses of Parliament
- Edith Garrud (1872–1971) – British martial artist and suffragette, first trainer of "the Bodyguard," formed in response to the Cat and Mouse Act
- Elizabeth Finlayson Gauld (c. 1863–1941) – Scottish suffrage campaigner based in Edinburgh
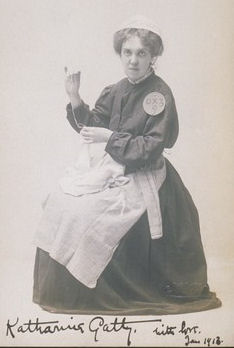
- Katharine Gatty in her prison uniform in 1913
  Katharine Gatty (1870–1952) – British journalist, lecturer, nurse and militant suffragette, member of the WSPU
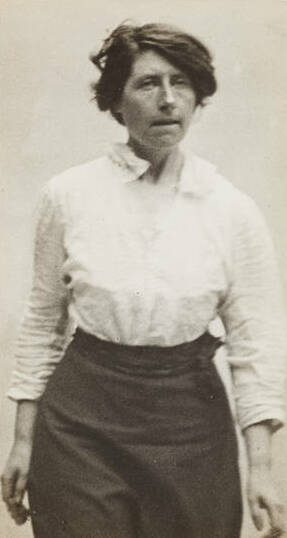
- Margaret Gibb in a Home Office police surveillance photograph of 1914
  Mary Gawthorpe (1881–1973) – English socialist, trade unionist, editor, active in the suffrage movement in both England and the United States
- Ellison Scotland Gibb (1879–1970) – Scottish suffragette and chess player
- Margaret Skirving Gibb (1877–1954) – Scottish suffragette and chess player
- Emma Gifford (1840–1912) – English writer and suffragist, member of the London Society for Women's Suffrage
- Marion Gilchrist (1864–1952) – Scottish doctor and suffragist, one of the founding members of the Glasgow and West of Scotland Association for Women's Suffrage, later joined the WSPU
- Helga Gill (1885–1928) – Norwegian-born British suffragist who spoke at meetings
- Edith Gittins – English artist and social reformer, ounder of the Leicester Women’s Liberal Association in 1886 and supported the Leicester Women’s Suffrage Society
- Katie Edith Gliddon (1883–1967) – British watercolour artist and militant suffragette
- Nellie Godfrey – English suffragette, awarded the Hunger Strike Medal
- Frances Gordon (born c. 1874) – British suffragette, prominent in the militant wing of the Scottish women's suffrage movement, member of the WSPU, imprisoned and force-fed
- Eva Gore-Booth (1870–1926) – Irish writer and suffragist, member of the executive committee of the NUWSS and co-secretary of the Manchester and Salford Women's Trade Union Council
- Lady Anna Gore-Langton – English campaigner, president of the Bath committee of the NUWSS, petitioned Stafford Northcote the Chancellor of the Exchequer concerning a bill to allow women the vote
- Gerald Gould (1885–1936) – English writer, known as a journalist, reviewer, essayist, and poet; co-founder of United Suffragists
- Mary Pollock Grant
  Mary Pollock Grant (1876–1957) – Scottish suffragette, Liberal Party politician, missionary and policewoman
- Rosa E. Grindon (1848–1923) – British suffragist and writer on Shakespeare
- Geraldine Grove (1863–1926) – English aristocrat, diarist and essayist, wrote to support women's suffrage, anti-vivisection and anti-vaccination
- Alice Gruner (1846–1929) – Estonian-born English educator, social worker, and suffragist
- Joan Lavender Bailie Guthrie (1889–1914) – British suffragette, and member of the WSPU, imprisoned for window smashing
- Elsa Gye (1881–1943) – Scottish suffragette, imprisoned for the cause, led WSPU branches in Nottingham and Newcastle

=== H ===
- Beatrice Forbes-Robertson Hale (1883–1967) – English actress and suffragist, lectured and wrote on women's rights
- Edith Hacon (1875–1952) – suffragist from Dornoch, World War I nursing volunteer and international socialite
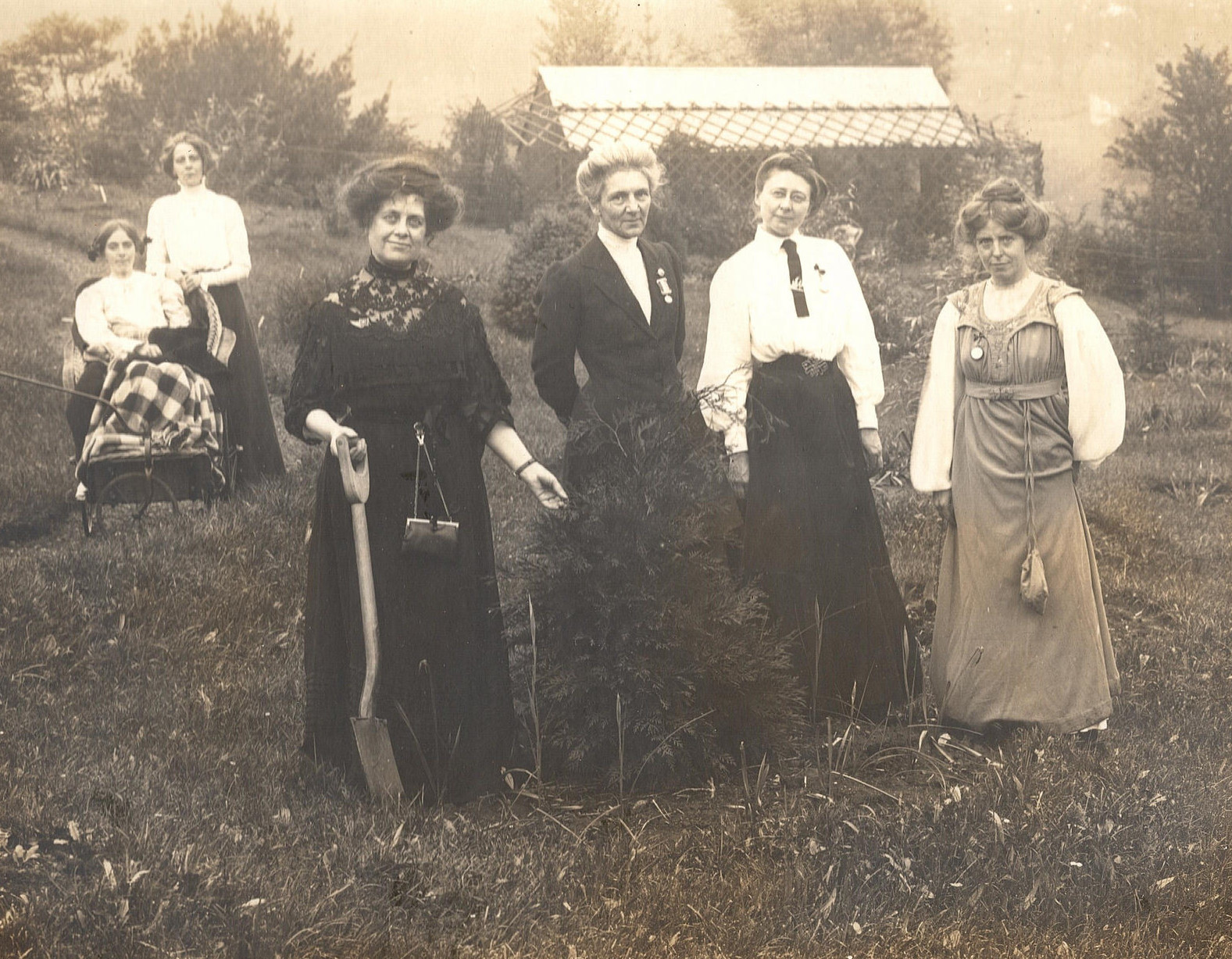
- Jessie Kenney and Kitty Kenney, Florence Haig, Marion Wallace-Dunlop and Mary Blathwayt at Eagle House in Batheaston, Somerset, England
  Florence Haig (1856–1952) – Scottish artist and suffragette who was decorated for imprisonments and hunger strikes
- Cicely Hale (1884–1981) – health visitor and author; worked for the WSPU and The Suffragette
- Nellie Hall (1895–1929) – British suffragette, god-daughter of Emmeline Pankhurst, member of the WSPU who was imprisoned twice
- Lilias Ashworth Hallett (1844–1922) – British suffragist and Quaker who helped to fund suffrage campaigning activities, member of the London Society for Women's Suffrage, member of the executive committee of the NUWSS and member of the WSPU
- Marie Frances Lisette Hanbury, Baroness Willoughby de Broke (1868–1941) – British peeress and suffragist, member of the Conservative and Unionist Women's Franchise Association (CUWFA)
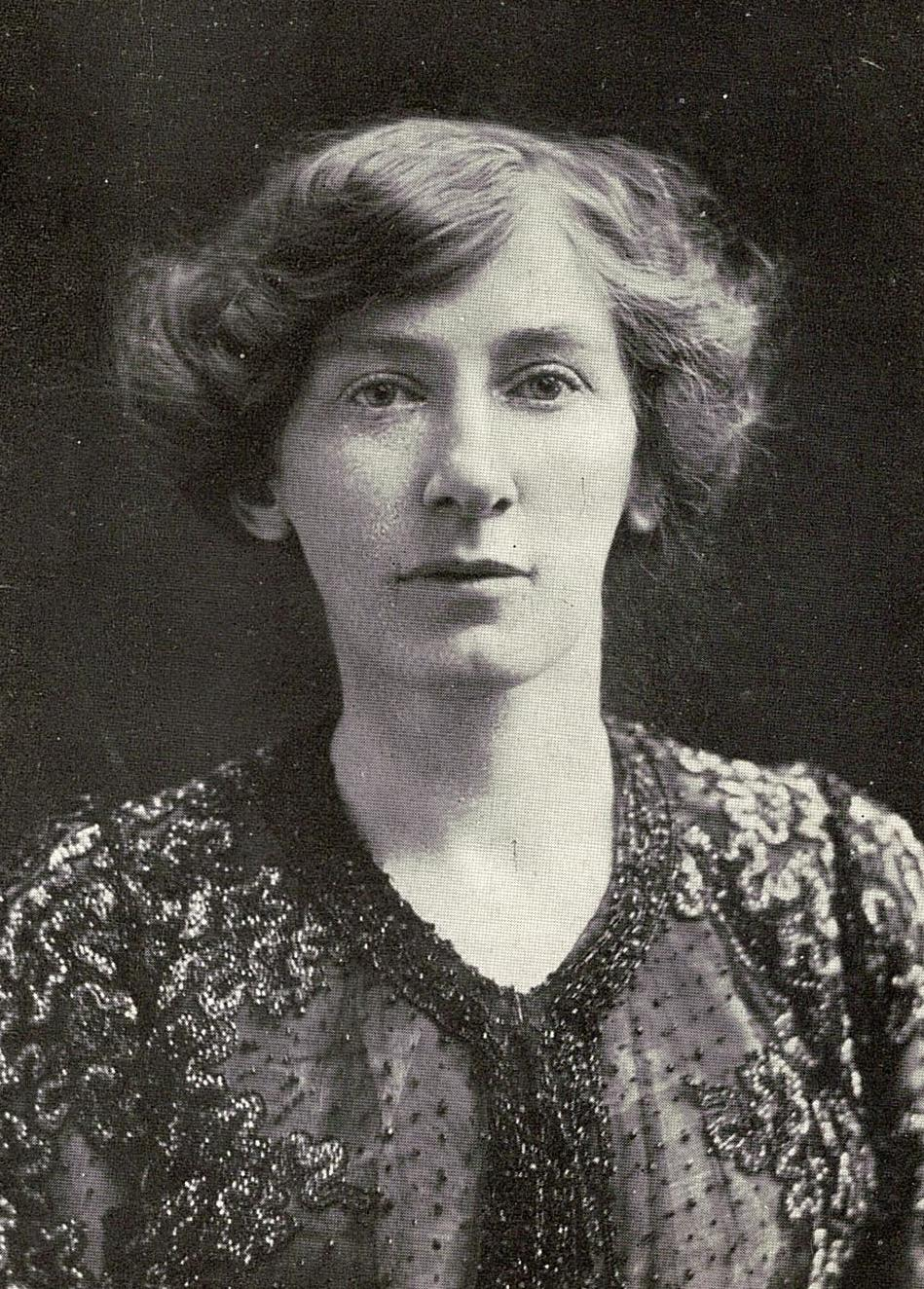
- Cicely Hamilton in 1907
  Hazel Hunkins Hallinan (1890–1982) – American women's rights activist, journalist, and suffragist who moved to Britain and was active in the women's movement there
- Cicely Hamilton (1872–1952) – English actress, writer, journalist and feminist
- Ishbel Hamilton-Gordon, Marchioness of Aberdeen and Temair (1857–1939) – author, philanthropist, and an advocate of woman's interests; head of the Women's Liberal Federation, which advocated for women's suffrage
- Marion Coates Hansen (1870–1947) – English suffragist, early member of the WSPU and co-founder of the WFL
- Agnes Harben – English suffragist and socialist, a founder of the United Suffragists
- Keir Hardie (1856–1915) – Scottish socialist and founder of the Labour Party, later a campaigner for women's suffrage
- Emily J. Harding (1850–1940) – British artist, illustrator and suffragette
- Gertrude Harding – Canadian-born suffragette, lived in England and member of the WSPU
- Beatrice Harraden (1864–1936) – British writer and suffragette, member of the WSPU
- Lillian Mary Harris (1887–1964) – English suffragette, active in Britain and Australia, member of the Women's Socialist Federation (set up in 1914 as the East London Federation of Suffragettes by Sylvia Pankhurst)
- Mary Dormer Harris (1867–1936) – English suffragist, local historian, writer and organiser of conferences in the Midlands area
- Jane Ellen Harrison (1850–1928) – British classicist, linguist, feminist, co-founder of modern studies in Greek mythology, supporter of women's suffrage
- Kate Harvey (1862–1946) – participated in the Women's Tax Resistance League and was jailed for her refusal to pay tax if she were not allowed the right to vote
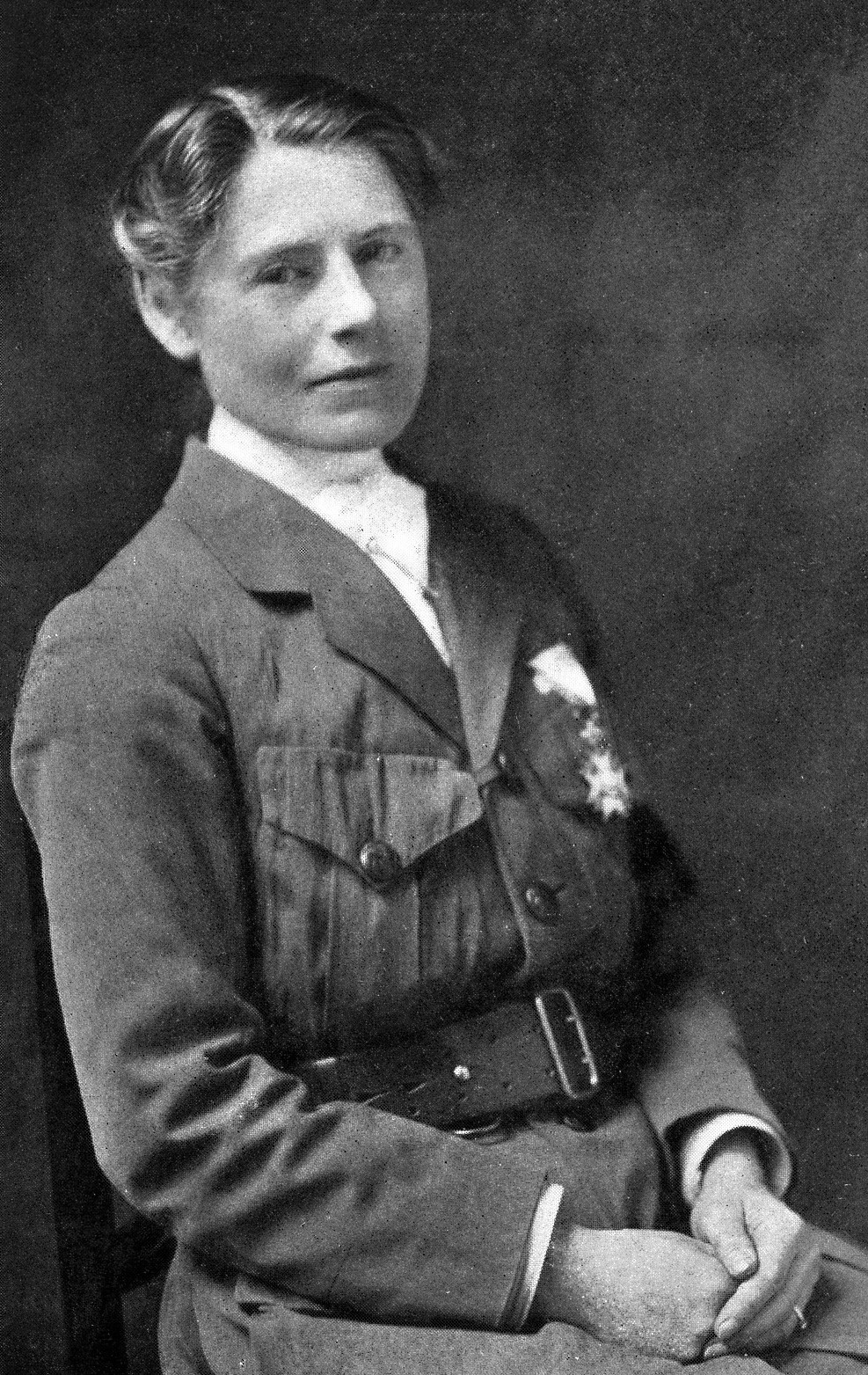
- Evelina Haverfield
  Evelina Haverfield (1867–1920) – British suffragette and aid worker and nurse in World War I, member of the WSPU, arrested several times
- Alice Hawkins (1863–1946) – English suffragette among the boot and shoe machinists of Leicester, jailed five times for militant action
- Annie Elizabeth Helme (1874–1963) – suffragist, JP, first female mayor of Lancaster in 1932
- Mary H. J. Henderson (1874–1938) – Scottish suffragette and war poet, honorary secretary of Dundee Women's Suffrage Society, and administrator with Scottish Women's Hospitals for Foreign Service
- Frances Heron-Maxwell (1863 – 1955) – sportswoman and suffragist, co-founder of the Liberal Women’s Suffrage Society
- Elizabeth Ellen (Beth) Hesmondhalgh (fl. 1907–1914), suffragette and Hunger Strike Medal recipient
- Mary Keating Hill (1863–1929), Welsh suffragette.
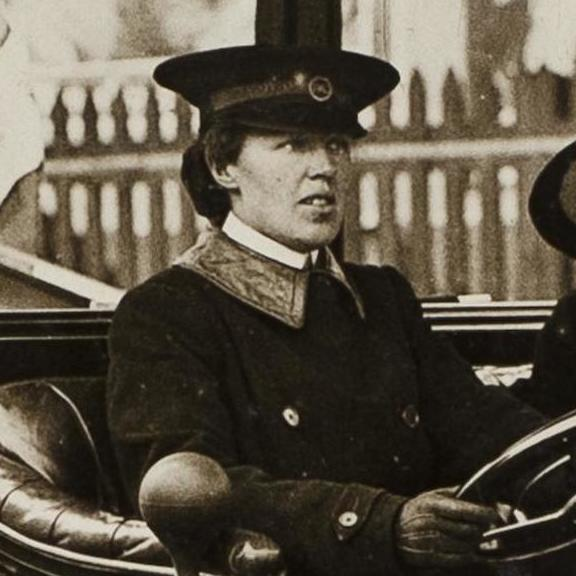
- Vera Holme in 1910
  Margaret Hills (1882–1967) – British teacher, public speaker, feminist and socialist; organizer of the NUWSS Election Fighting Fund
- Edith Mary Hinchley (1870–1940) – artist and member of the WFL
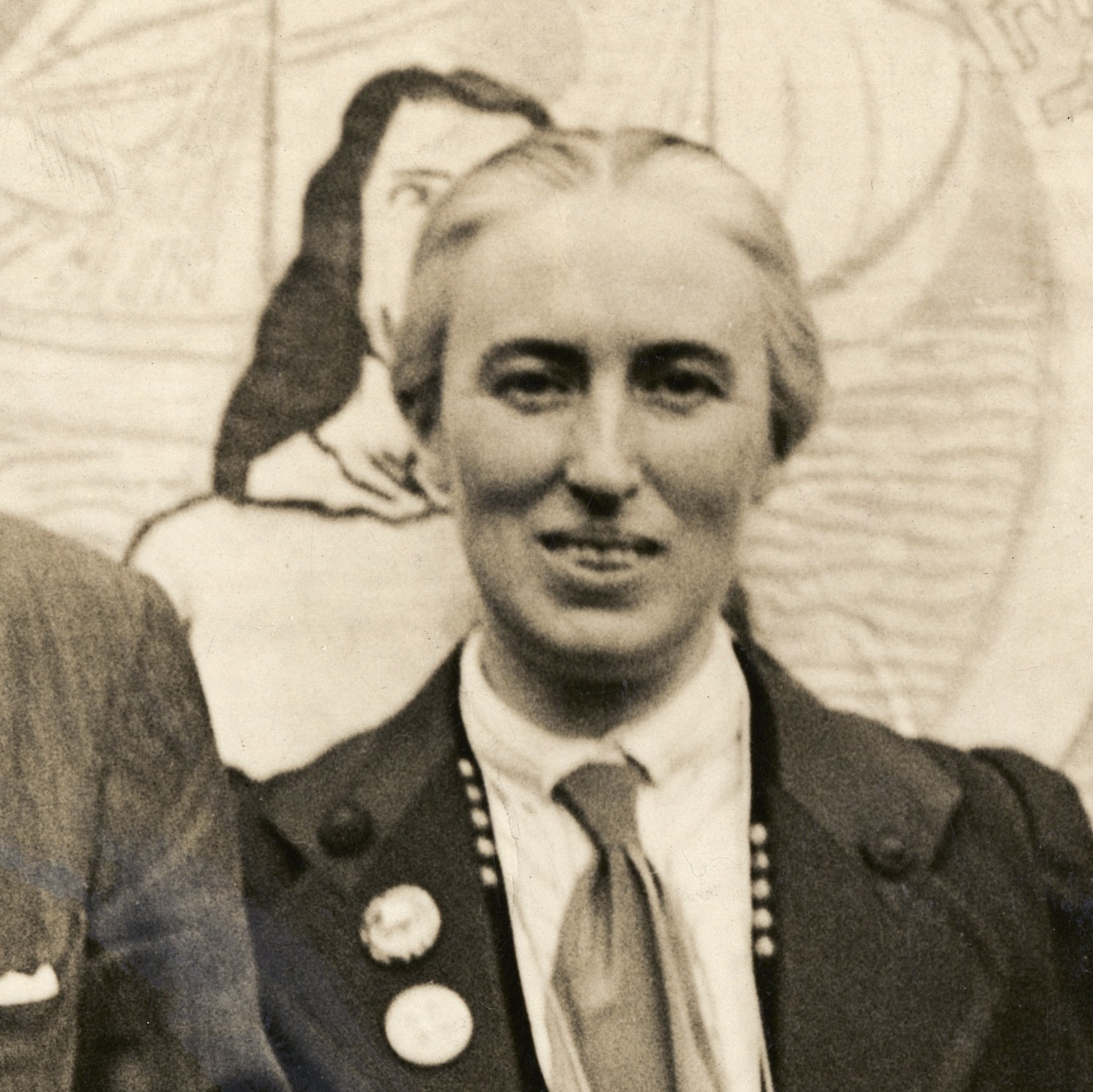
- Clemence Housman in 1910
  Reverend Claude Hinscliff (1875–1964) – founder of the Church League for Women's Suffrage
- Emily Hobhouse (1860–1926) – exposed the squalid conditions in concentration camps in South Africa during the Second Boer War; active in the People's Suffrage Federation
- Margaret Emily Hodge (1858–1938) – British educator, suffragist and pacifist active in Britain and Australia, member of the Womanhood Suffrage League of New South Wales (WSL), the British Dominions Women's Suffrage Union (BDWSU) and the WFL
- Olive Hockin (1881–1936) – British suffragette, artist and author; imprisoned after arson attacks suspected to be suffragette-related
- Vera Holme (1881–1969) – British actress, member of the AFL, driver and chauffeur for the Pankhurst family
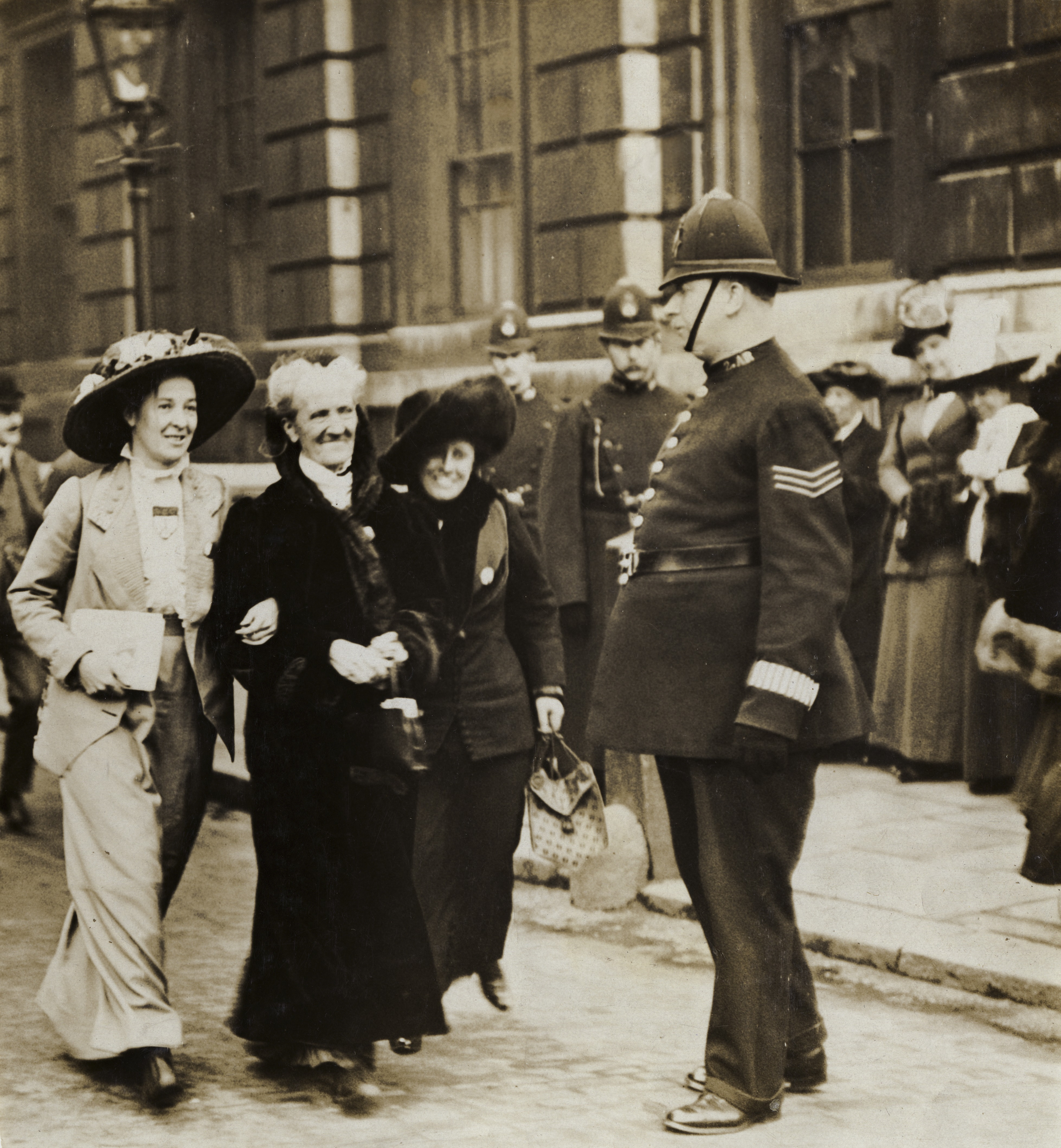
- Charlotte Despard, Edith How Martyn and Emma Sproson c. 1914
  Winifred Holtby (1898–1935) – English feminist, socialist, and writer, including a new voters guide for women in 1929
- Edith Sophia Hooper (1868–1926) – English suffragist and biographer of Josephine Butler
- Winifred Horrabin (1887–1971) – British socialist activist, journalist, member of the WSPU
- Clemence Housman (1861–1955) – English author, illustrator, co-founder of the Suffrage Atelier
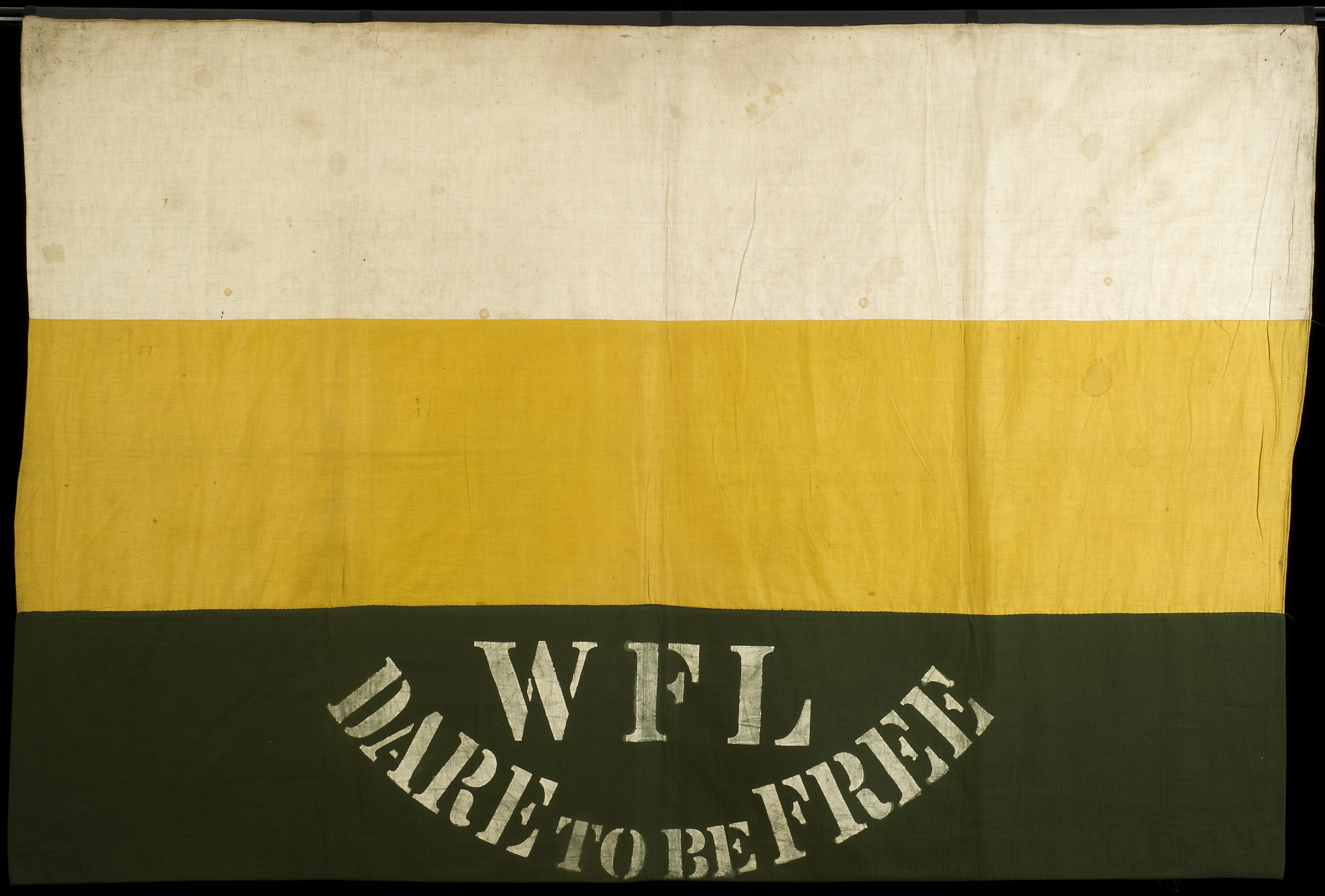
- Women's Freedom League (WFL) flag from 1908
  Laurence Housman (1865–1959) – English playwright, writer, illustrator, co-founder of the Suffrage Atelier
- Ethel May Hovey (1871–1953) – Welsh campaigner for women's rights, suffrage, education and maternity care
- Rosa Howlett (1863–1961) – artist and suffragist
- Edith How-Martyn (1875–1954) – British suffragette, joint secretary of the WSPU and co-founder of the WFL, arrested in the lobby of the House of Commons trying to give a speech which was one of the first acts of suffragette militancy
- Elsie Howey (1884–1963) – English suffragette who was jailed at least six times and dressed as Joan of Arc during a WSPU demonstration in London
- Ann Harriet Hughes – Welsh language novelist, poet, and newspaper editor, supporter of temperance and women's suffrage movements
- Ellen Hughes (1867–1927) – Welsh writer, poet, temperance reformer and suffragist
- Florence Hull (born 1878) – English suffragette, member of WSPU, imprisoned in January 1913
- Ethel Hurlbatt (1866–1934) – British academic and suffragist, member of the Cardiff and District National Suffrage Society and honorary secretary for the Association for Promoting the Education of Women
- Agnes Husband (1852–1929) – Scottish politician and suffragette

=== I ===
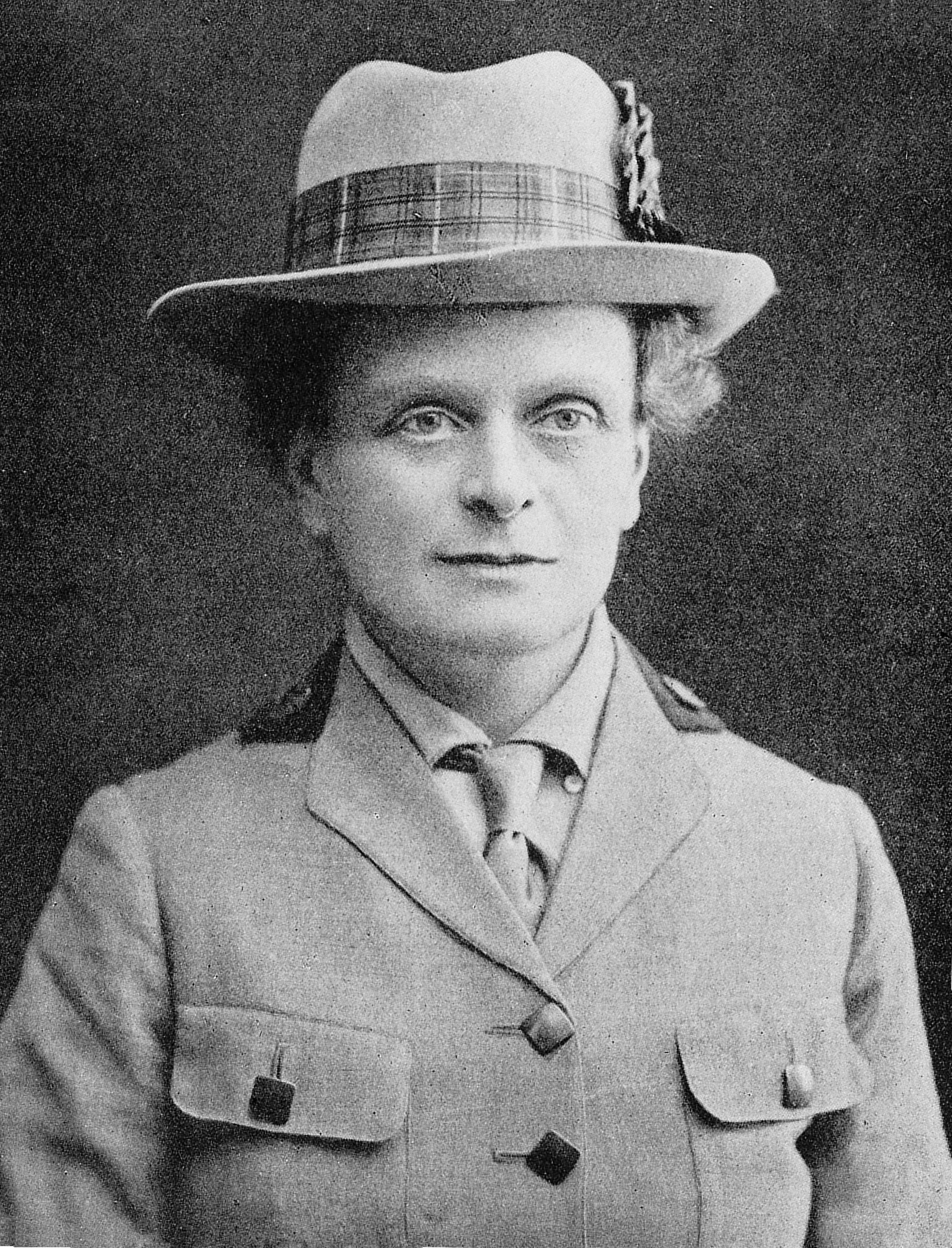
- Elsie Inglis
  Charlotte Iliffe, Baroness Iliffe (1881–1972) – English aristocrat, philanthropist and suffragist, member of the Coventry Women's Suffrage Society (CWSS)
- Elsie Inglis (1864–1917) – Scottish doctor, secretary of the Edinburgh National Society for Women's Suffrage and founder of the Scottish Women's Hospitals
- Paulina Irby (1831–1911) – British travel writer and suffragist
- Margaret Irwin (1858–1940) – Scottish trade unionist, suffragist and founder member of the Glasgow and West of Scotland Association for Women's Suffrage

=== J ===
- Jane (Jennie) Alice Jackson (1880-1955) Preston, Lancashire mill worker. Imprisoned in 1907 at Holloway for suffragette activities. Key organiser against the census 1911. Member of the Independent Labour Party.
- Christina Jamieson (1864–1942) – Scottish writer and suffragette
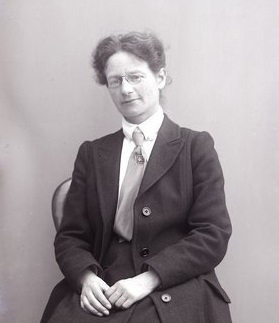
- Maud Joachim in 1910
  Gabrielle Jeffery (1886–1940) – British suffragist and founder of the Catholic Women's Suffrage Society
- Dorothy Jewson (1884–1964) – British teacher, trade union organiser, Labour Party politician and suffragist
- Dorothy Jinarajadasa (1881–1963) – English justice of the peace, suffragette, theosophist and writer based in India, member of the Women's Indian Association
- Maud Joachim (1869–1947) – English suffragette who was one of the first to go on hunger strike, member of the WSPU
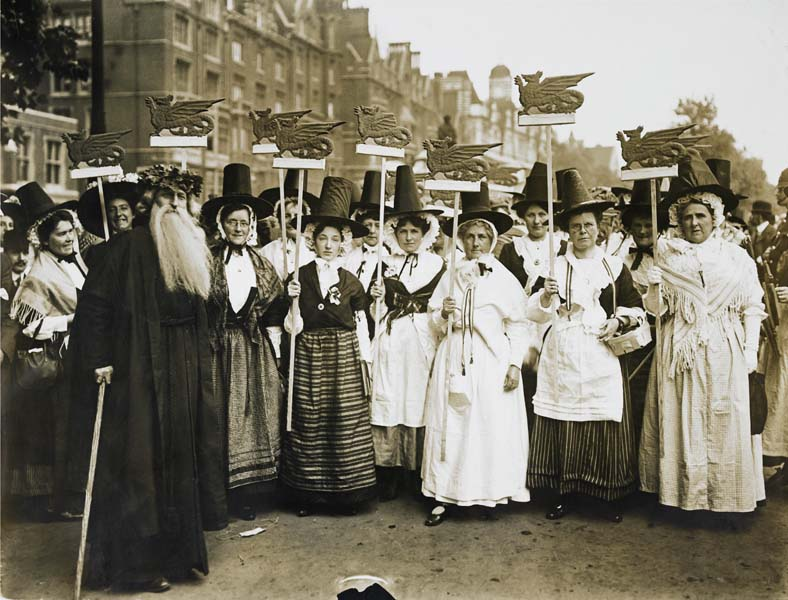
- Welsh suffragists in traditional dress at the Women's Coronation Procession in London in 1911
  C. E. M. Joad (1891–1953) – English philosopher, teacher and broadcasting personality, member of the Men's League for Women's Suffrage
- Ellen Isabel Jones (died 1948) – English suffragette and close associate of the Pankhurst family
- Helena Jones (1870–1946) – Welsh doctor and member of the WSPU
- Mabel Jones (1865–1923) – English doctor and suffragette
- Violet Key Jones (1883–1958) – Anglo-Irish writer and suffragette, treasurer of the WSPU branch in York
- Lily Delissa Joseph (1863–1940) – British painter and suffragist

=== K ===
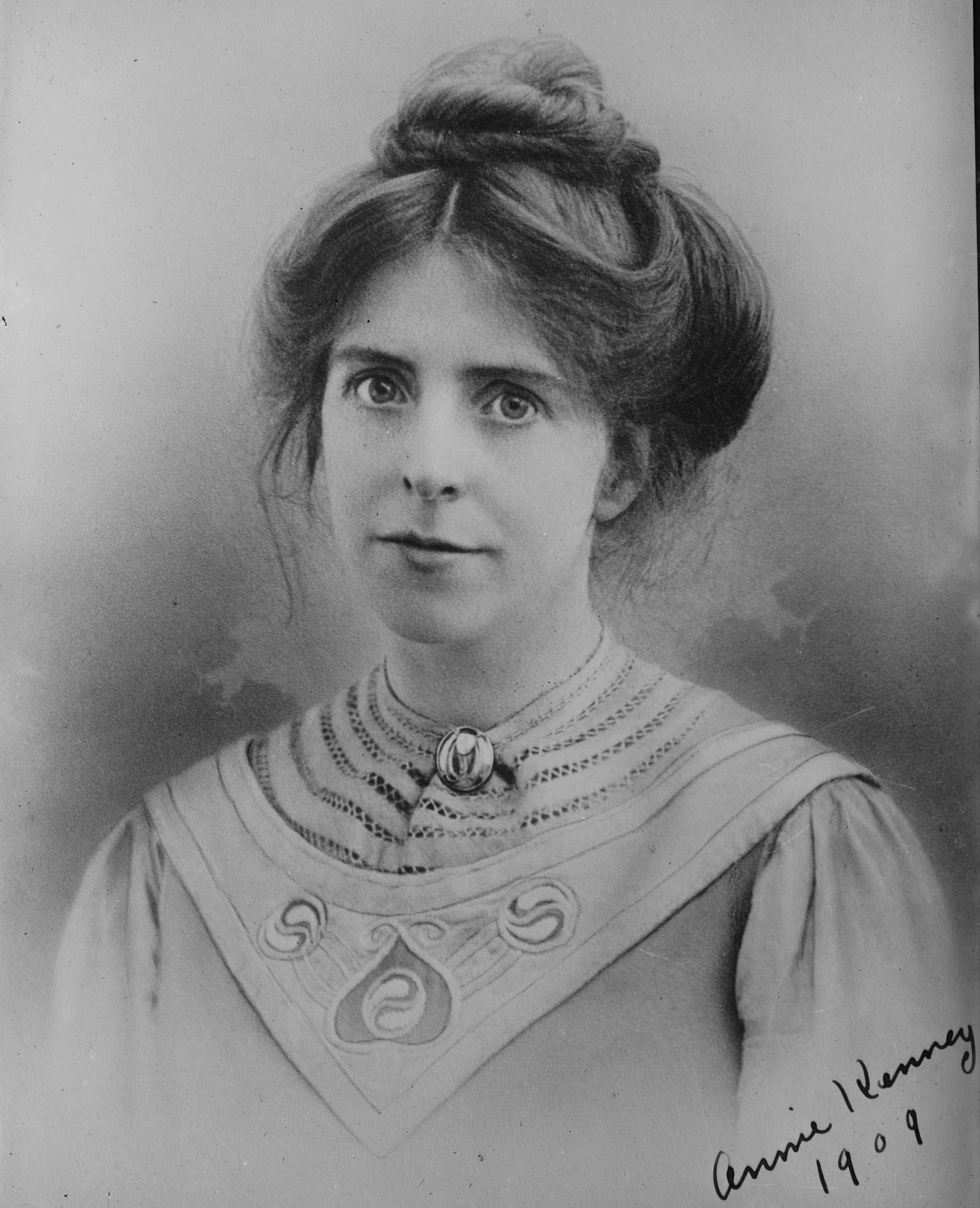
- Annie Kenney in 1909
  Gladice Keevil (1884–1959) – British suffragette, head of the WSPU in the Midlands area
- Annie Kenney (1879–1953) – English working class suffragette and leading figure in the WSPU
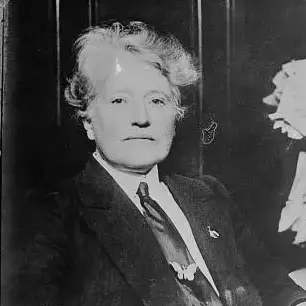
- Harriet Kerr in 1913
  Jessie Kenney (1887–1985) – English leading suffragette, assaulted the British prime minister and the home secretary at a golf course
- Kitty Kenney (1880–1952) – English suffragette, member of the WSPU
- Nell Kenney (1876–1953) – English suffragette
- Jessie Keppie (1868–1951) – Scottish artist and subscriber to the Glasgow and West of Scotland Association for Women's Suffrage
- Alice Stewart Ker (1853–1943) – Scottish doctor, health educator and suffragette
- Harriet Kerr (1859–1940) – British suffragette and office manager of the WSPU headquarters
- Edith Key (1872–1937) – British secretary-organiser of the WSPU, Huddersfield branch, and author of the only surviving regional WSPU minute book
- Mary Stewart Kilgour (1851–1955) – British educationalist and writer, co-founder of the Union of Practical Suffragists
- Jessie M. King – Scottish illustrator and suffragist
- Adelaide Knight (1871–1950) – British secretary for the WSPU in Canning Town
- Anne Knight (1786–1862) – British social reformer, pioneer of feminism, early suffragette and pamphleteer
- Louisa Knightley – British suffragist, founding president of the CUWFA

=== L ===
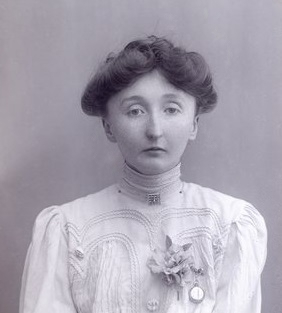
- Aeta Lamb in 1911
  Agnes Lake (1887–1972) – English suffragist, hunger striker and business manager of the WSPU’s newspaper The Suffragette
- Aeta Lamb (1886–1928) – British suffragette and longest serving organiser in the WSPU
- George Lansbury (1859–1940) – British social reformer and politician who allied himself with the WSPU
- Minnie Lansbury (1889–1922) – English suffragette and alderman, chair of the ELFS
- Frida Laski (1884–1977) – British suffragist, birth control advocate and eugenicist
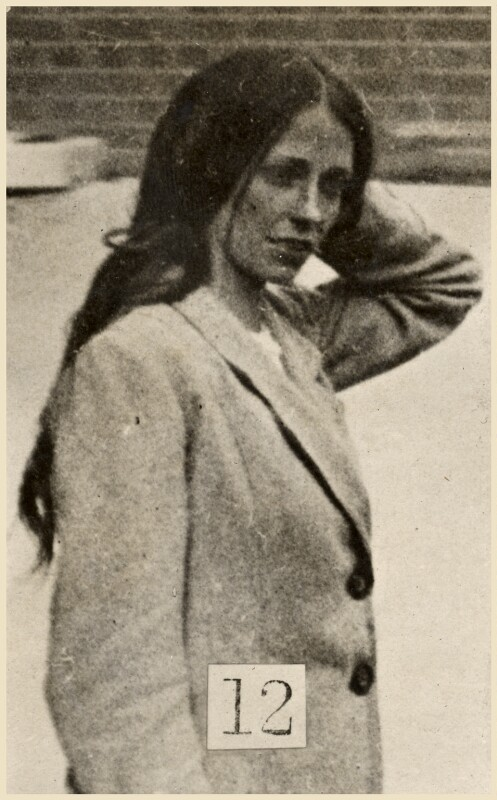
  Lilian Lenton in a Home Office police surveillance photograph of 1914
- Dorothy Layton (1887–1959) – English suffragist and Liberal Party politician, member of the NUWSS
- Jennie Lee (1904–1988) – Scottish politician, elected MP aged 24 in 1929 by-election before suffrage was extended to women under 30
- Harriet Leisk (1853–1921) – Shetland suffragist and chair of the Shetland Women's Suffrage Society
- Lilian Lenton (1891–1972) – English member of the WSPU, winner of a French Red Cross for her service in WWI
- Henrietta Leslie (1884–1946) – British suffragette, writer and pacifist
- Connie Lewcock (1894–1980) – British suffragette, arsonist and socialist
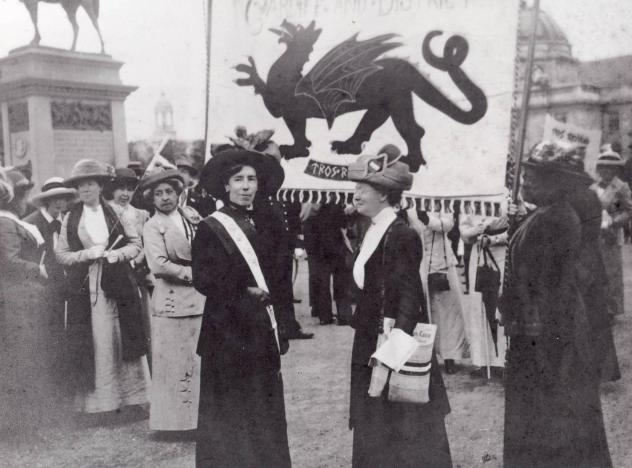
- Members of the Cardiff and District Women's Suffrage Society, including Rose Mabel Lewis, at the Women's Suffrage Pilgrimage in Cathays Park, Cardiff in 1913
  Rose Mabel Lewis (1853–1928) – Welsh writer and suffragist, leader of the Cardiff and District Women's Suffrage Society
- Elizabeth Lidgett (1843–1919) – British Poor Law guardian and suffragist
- Victoria Lidiard (1889–1992) – WPSU member and reputed to be the longest surviving British suffragette
- Ellen Kate Limouzin (1870–1950) – suffragist and member of the Actresses' Franchise League
- Anna Lindsay (activist) (1845–1903) – Scottish women's rights activist
- Thomas Martin Lindsay (1843–1914) – Scottish historian, professor and founder member of the Glasgow and West of Scotland Association for Women's Suffrage
- Florence Lockwood (1861–1937) – British suffragist active in West Yorkshire, served on the executive of the Huddersfield Branch of the NUWSS
- Mary Lowndes (1857–1929) – British stained-glass artist and suffragette, chair of the Artists' Suffrage League (ASL) and member of the NUWSS
- Gertrude Golda Lowy (1887–1982) – English suffragette member of the WSPU, awarded the Hunger Strike Medal and member of the Jewish League for Woman Suffrage
- Margaret Bright Lucas (1818–1890) – temperance activist and suffragist
- Louisa Lumsden (1840–1935) – Scottish pioneer of female education and suffrage speaker, president of the Aberdeen branch of the NUWSS, planted The Suffrage Oak in Glasgow
- Kathleen Lyttelton (1856–1907) – British women's activist, editor and writer, co-founded The Cambridge Association For Women's Suffrage (CAWS)

=== M ===
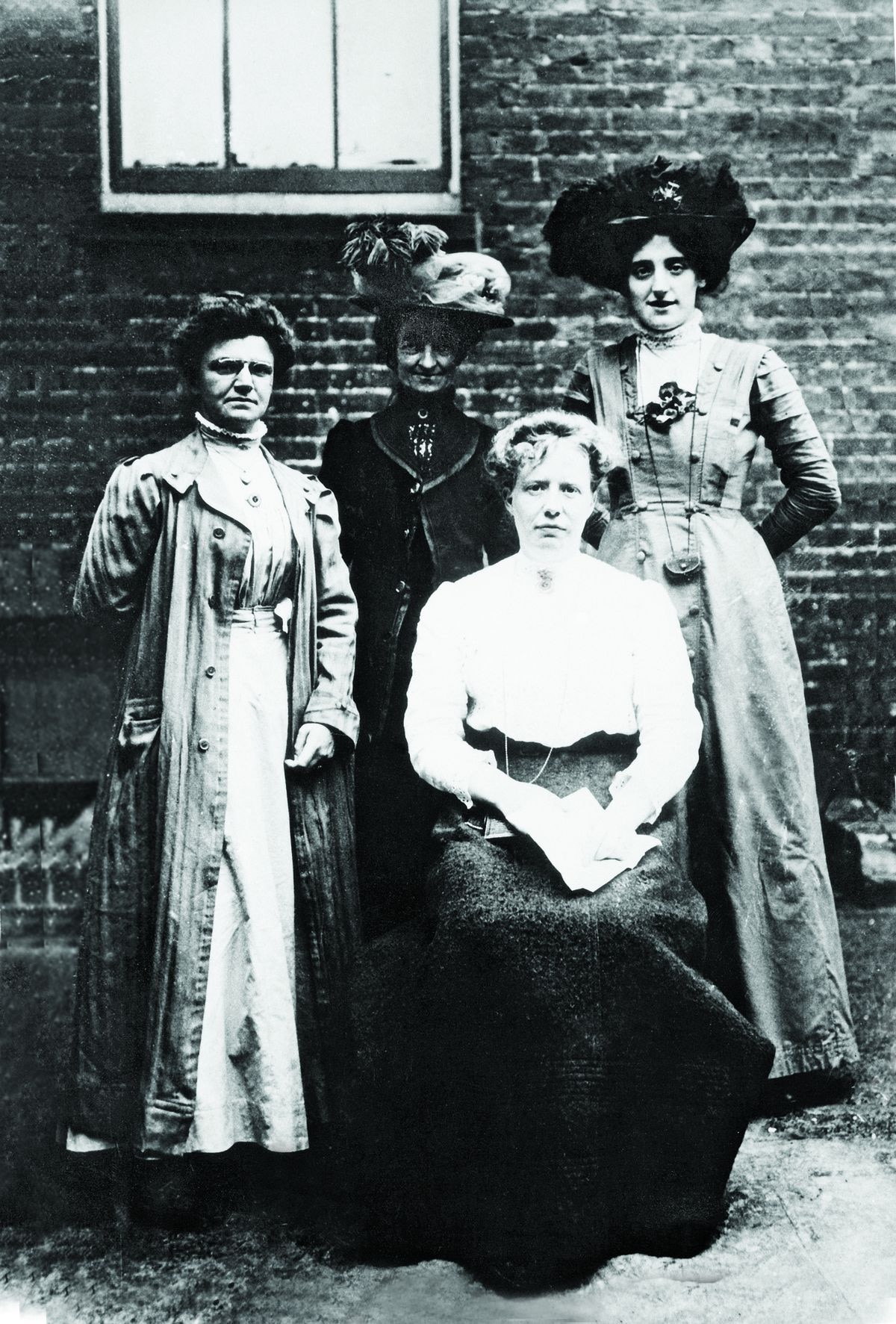
- Group photograph including suffrage activists Mary Macarthur and Julia Varley in 1908
  Mary Macarthur (1880–1921) – British labour organizer, general secretary of the Women's Trade Union League and was involved in the formation of the National Federation of Women Workers (NFWW) and National Anti-Sweating League
- Ann Macbeth (1875–1948) – British artist, educator and suffragist, member of the WSPU
- Agnes Syme Macdonald (1882–1966) – Scottish suffragette who served as the secretary of the Edinburgh branch of the WSPU before setting up the Edinburgh Women Citizens Association (WCA) in 1918
- Louisa Macdonald (1858–1949) – Scottish educationalist and suffragist
- Florence Macfarlane (1867–1947) – Scottish nurse and suffragette known as "Dundee’s hunger striker," member of the WSPU
- Chrystal Macmillan (1872–1937) – British politician, barrister, feminist and pacifist, member of the NUWSS and secretary of the International Woman Suffrage Alliance
- Marion Mackenzie (born 1873) – British medical doctor and suffragette, cofounded the WSPU branch in Scarborough
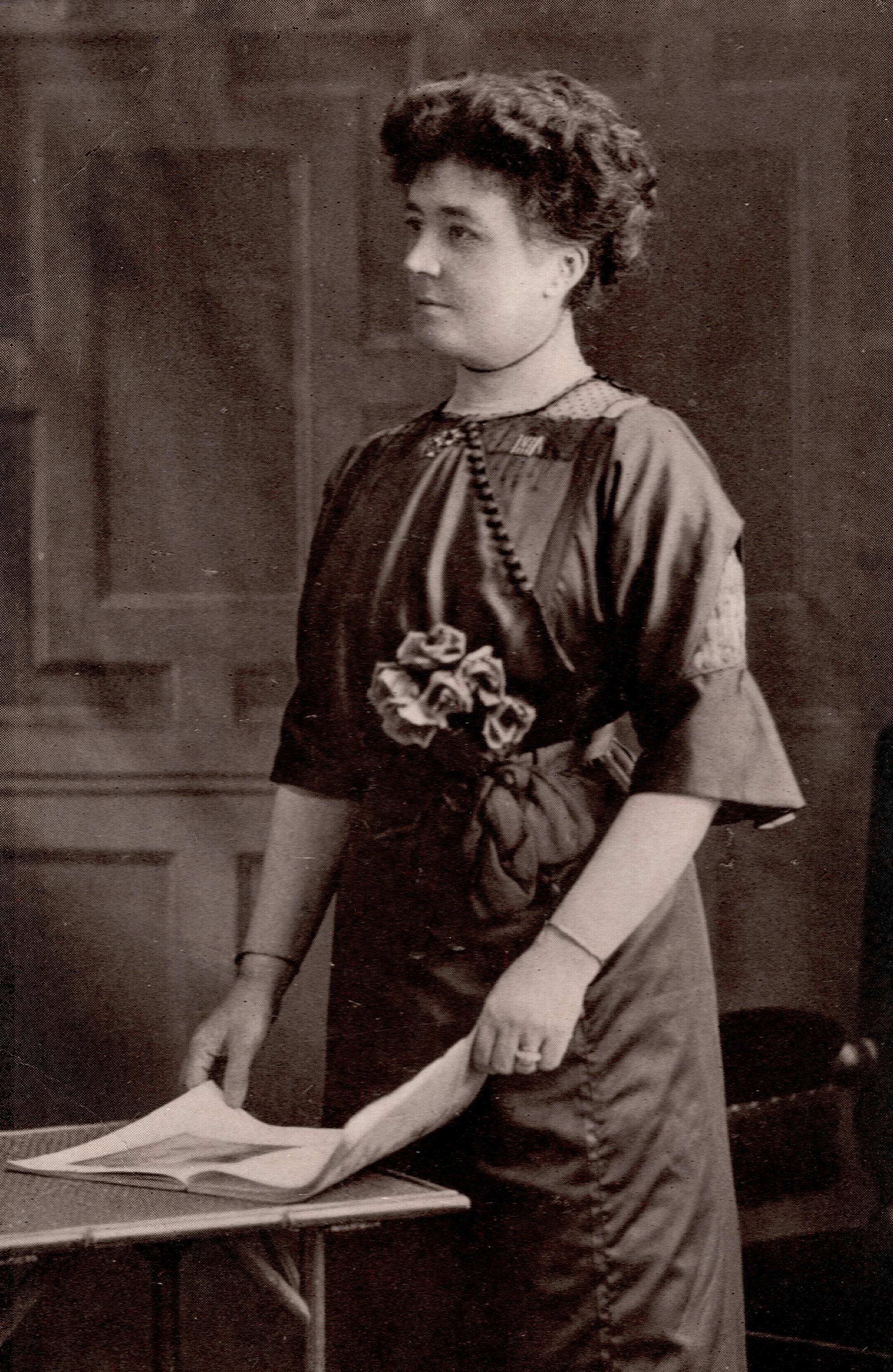
- Edith Mansell-Moullin c. 1909
  Sarah Mair (1846–1941) – Scottish campaigner for women's education and suffrage
- Lavinia Malcolm (1847–1920) – Scottish suffragist and local Liberal Movement politician, the first Scottish woman to be elected to a local council (1907) and the first woman Lord Provost of a Scottish burgh town, in Dollar, Clackmannanshire
- Evelyn Manesta – British suffragette, damaged paintings in Manchester Art Gallery and was imprisoned for a month
- Kate Manicom (1893–1937) – British suffragette and trade unionist
- Grace Marcon (1889–1965) – British suffragette who damaged five paintings in the National Gallery
- Edith Mansell-Moullin (1859–1941) – English suffragist, settlement worker, and founder of the Cymric Suffrage Union in Wales
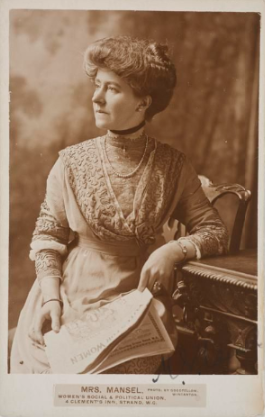
- Mildred Mansel in 1910
  Catherine Marshall (1880–1961) – British suffragette and campaigner against war conscription, member of the NUWSS, founder of the Keswick branch
- Christabel Marshall (1871–1960) – English author and suffragist
- Flora Masson (1856–1937) – Scottish nurse, suffragist, writer and editor
- Mildred Mansel (1868–1942) – English suffragette, organiser for the WSPU in Bath and member of the Central Society for Women's Suffrage, arrested in Wales
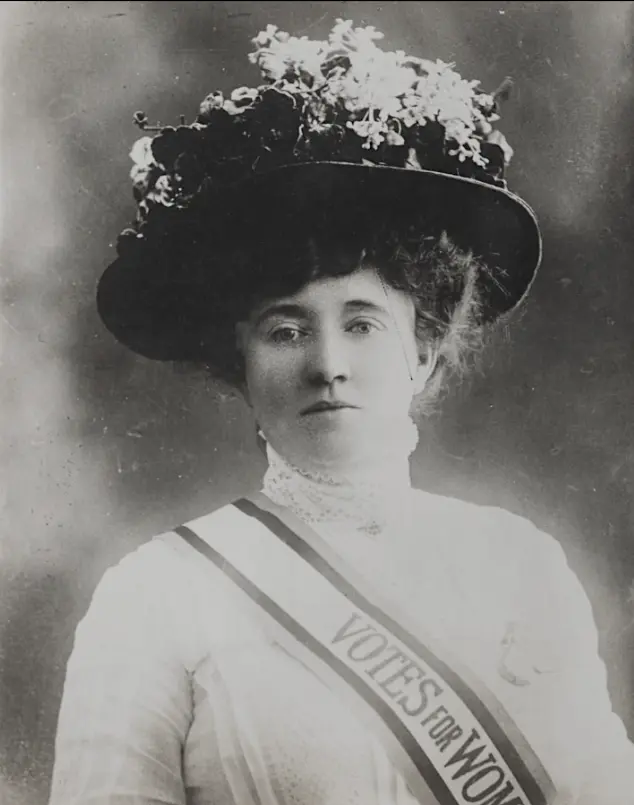
- Kitty Marion c. 1910
  Grace Marcon (1889–1965) – British suffragette; damaged five paintings in the National Gallery
- Kitty Marion (1871–1944) – German-born English actress, suffragette and birth control activist, member of the WSPU, perpetrated arson attacks, sentenced to three years in prison
- Dora Marsden (1882–1960) – English anarcho-feminist, suffragette, editor of literary journals, and philosopher of language; member of the WSPU
- Charlotte Marsh (1842–1909) – British suffragette, joined the WSPU in March 1907, set up the Independent WSPU in March 1916, first suffragette to be arrested in Hull
- Katherine "Kitty" Marshall (1870–1947) – British suffragette, member of the WSPU, one of the suffrajitsu bodyguards of the movement, awarded the hunger strike medal
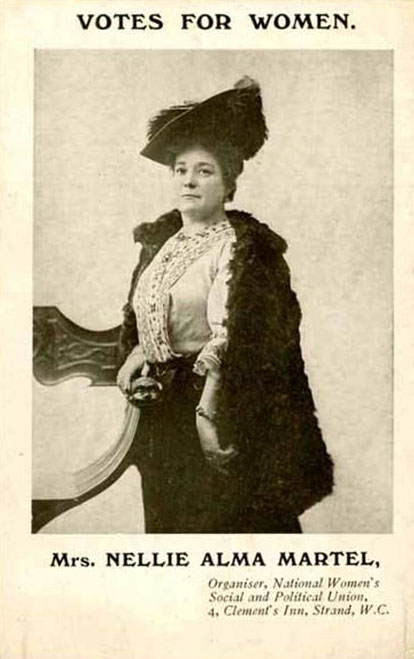
- Nellie Martel in 1906
  Nellie Martel (1855–1940) – English-Australian suffragist and elocutionist
- Rita Martin (1875–1958) – English photographer and suffragist
- Selina Martin (1882–1972) – English suffragette awarded the Hunger Strike Medal
- Louisa Martindale (1839–1914) – English suffragist and activist, member of the NUWSS
- Harriet Martineau (1802–1876) – English social theorist and writer
- Gertrude Massingham (1887–1963) – English suffragist and activist, member of the NUWSS and RSPCA, prospective parliamentary candidate.
- Bertha Mason (1855–1939) – English suffragist and temperance campaigner, committee member of the NUWSS and the National Council of Women of Great Britain
- Flora Masson (1856–1937) – Scottish nurse, editor, writer and suffragist, daughter of suffragist Emily Rosaline Orme
- Rosamund Massy in 1913
  Rosamund Massy (1870–1947) – English suffragette, member of the WSPU awarded the hunger strike medal, one of the organisers of the Emmeline and Christabel Pankhurst Memorial in London
- Muriel Matters (1877–1969) – Australian-born actress, elocutionist and suffragist who campaigned with the WFL in England, participant in the "Grille Incident"
- Helen Matthews – Scottish suffragette and women's footballer
- Constance Maud (1856 – 11 May 1929) – English writer and suffragette, member of the Women Writers' Suffrage League, author of No Surrender in 1911, a novel about the struggle for votes for women, and articles for the Votes for Women newspaper
- Jenny Maude (1857–1935) – author of her famous mother Jenny Lind's biography. In 1908, can be seen marching with her mother's suffragette banner
- Lilly Maxwell (1800–1876) – early British suffragist
- Isabella Fyvie Mayo (1843–1914) – Scottish poet, novelist, suffragist, and reformer
- Winifred Mayo (1869–1967) – British actress and suffragette, co-founder of the AFL
- Elspeth Douglas McClelland (1879–1920) – English architect and suffragette, "human letter" sent with South African suffragette Daisy Solomon
- Janet McCallum (1881–1946) – Scottish trade unionist and suffragist
- Margaret McCoubrey (1880–1955) – Belfast suffragette, member of the WSPU, pacifist and co-operatist
- Elizabeth McCracken (1871–1944) – Irish feminist writer ("L.A.M. Priestley"), Belfast WSPU militant, refused wartime political truce with the government
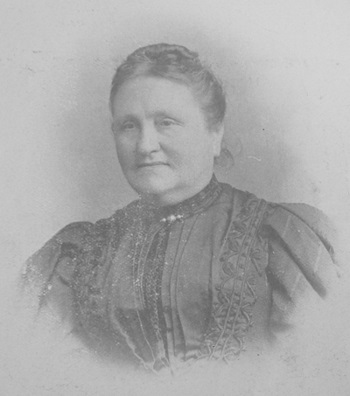
- Harriet McIlquham pictured in the Cheltenham Graphic in 1905
  Harriet McIlquham (1837–1910) – English suffragist, poor law guardian and local councillor; co-founded the WFL and Women's Emancipation Union (WEU)
- Agnes McLaren (1837–1913) – British doctor and suffragette, gave suffrage lectures in Orkney and Shetland, secretary of the Edinburgh National Society for Women's Suffrage alongside her stepmother Priscilla Bright McLaren
- Alice McLaren (1860–1945) – Scottish doctor, gynaecologist, suffragist and advocate for women's health and women's rights
- Eva McLaren (1852–1921) – English suffragist, writer, and political campaigner
- Priscilla Bright McLaren (1815–1906) – Scottish suffragist, anti-slavery activist, founder and president of Edinburgh National Society for Women's Suffrage
- Frances McPhun (1880–1940) – Scottish suffragette who served two months in Holloway prison, sister of Margaret McPhun
- Margaret McPhun (1876–1960) – Scottish suffragette who served two months in Holloway prison, sister of Frances McPhun
- Margaret Sara Meggitt (1866–1920) – British political activist and suffragette
- Frances Melville (1873–1962) – Scottish suffragist, advocate for higher education for women in Scotland, and one of the first women to matriculate at the University of Edinburgh
- Flora Merrifield (1859–1943) – English suffragist
- Gertrude Metcalfe-Shaw (born 1864) – British suffragette, awarded the hunger strike medal
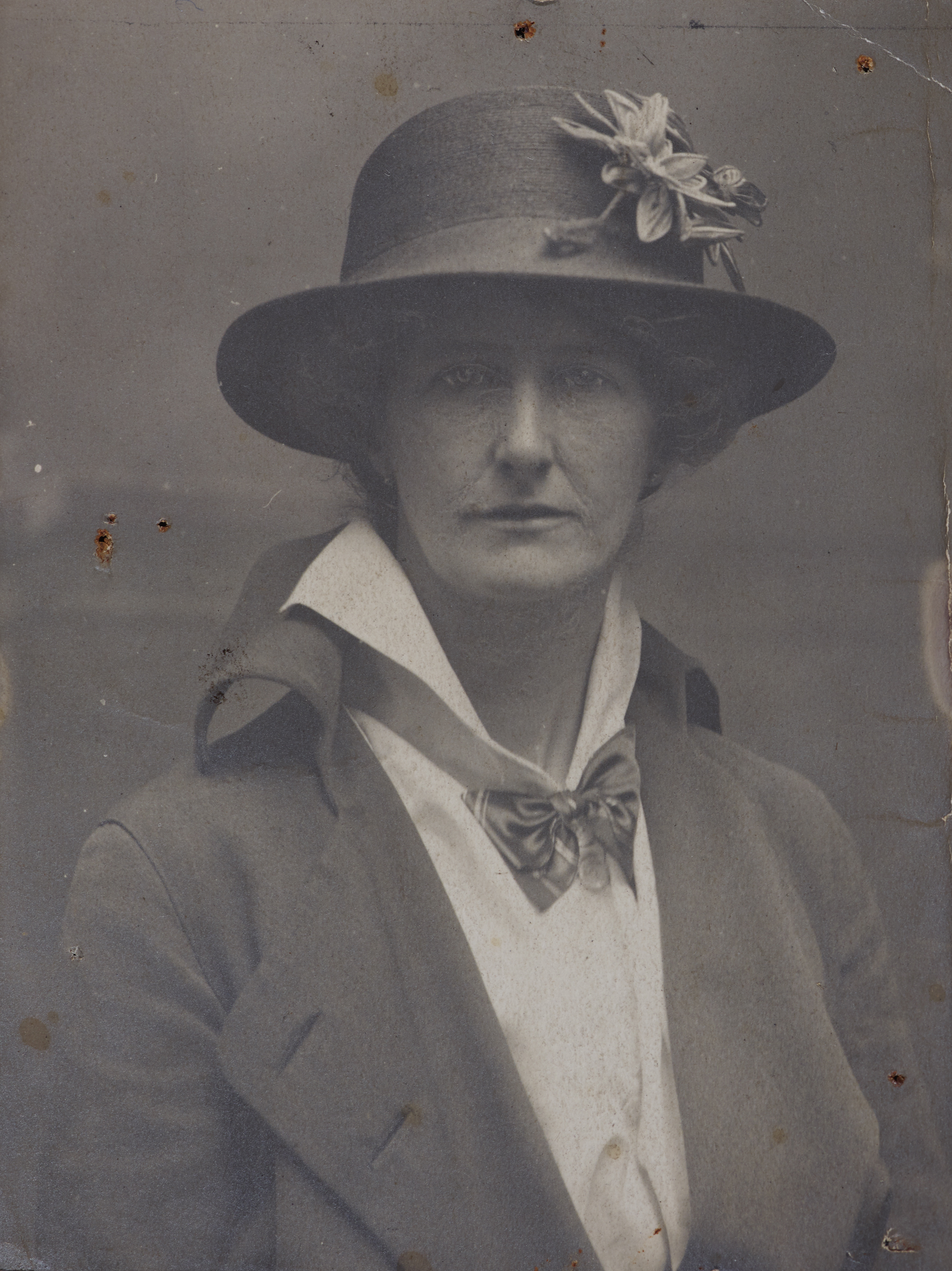
- Lillian Metge
  Lillian Metge (1871–1954) – Anglo-Irish suffragette, bombed Christ Church Cathedral in Lisburn, Northern Ireland, member of the WSPU and Hunger Strike medallist
- Jessie C. Methven (1854–1917) – Scottish suffragist, suffragette, honorary secretary of Edinburgh National Society for Women's Suffrage, joined the WSPU 1906
- Adele Meyer (1855–1930) – English socialite, social reformer, suffragist and philanthropist, supporter of the Women's Tax Resistance League (WTRL) and the Anti-Sweating League
- Alice Meynell (1847–1922) – English poet and suffragist, vice-president of the Women Writers' Suffrage League and co-founder of the Catholic Women's Suffrage Society
- Harriet Taylor Mill (1807–1858) – English philosopher and women's rights advocate
- John Stuart Mill (1806–1873) – English philosopher, political economist, and civil servant, brought the first parliamentary proposal to enfranchise some women
- Florence Fenwick Miller (1854-1935) English suffragist, journalist, writer, public speaker and physician
- Irene Miller (1880–1964) – British screenwriter
  Decima Moore
- Ernestine Mills (1871–1959) – English metalworker, enameller, artist, writer and suffragette, member of the WSPU
- Hannah Mitchell (1872–1956) – English suffragette and socialist
- Graham Moffat (1866–1951) – Scottish actor, director, playwright and spiritualist, husband of Maggie Moffat and founder of the Northern Men's Federation for Women's Suffrage in Glasgow
- Maggie Moffat (1873–1943) – British actor and suffragette
- Dora Montefiore (1851–1933) – English-Australian women's suffragist, socialist, poet and autobiography writer
- Decima Moore (1871–1964) – English actress and soprano, co-founder of the AFL
- Ethel Moorhead (1869–1955) – British suffragette and painter
- Clara Mordan (1844–1915) – British suffragist and benefactor to the WSPU
- Mary Morris (1873–1925) – Welsh doctor and suffragist
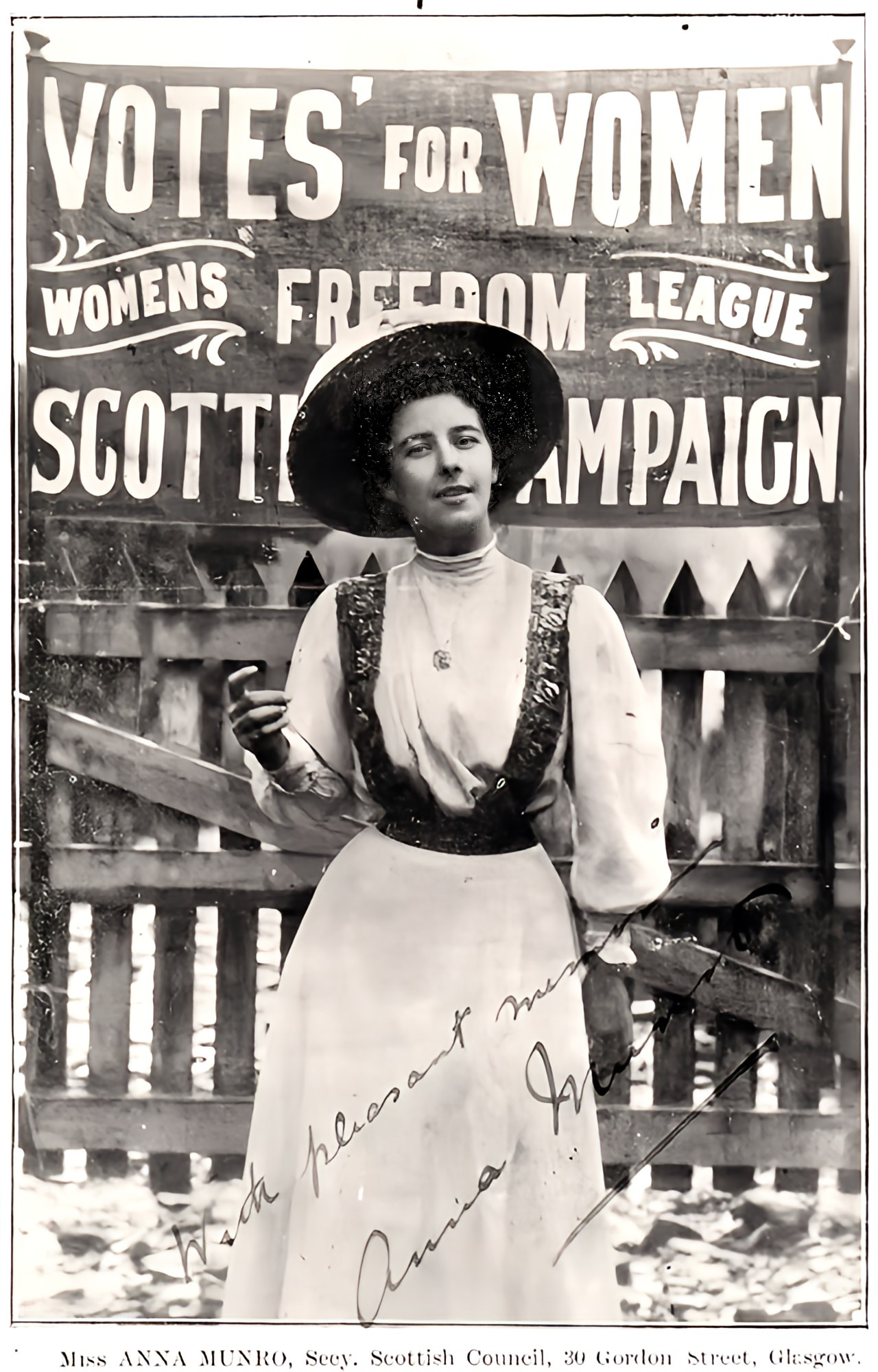
- Anna Munro in 1909
  Alice Morrissey (1868–1912) – English suffragette, socialist and Catholic activist
- Annie Mullin (1847–1921) – Welsh suffragist, social worker and Liberal councillor
- Anna Munro (1881–1962) – Scottish suffragist, secretary of the WFL in Scotland
- Mary Murdoch (1864–1916) – Scottish physician and suffragist
- Eunice Murray (1878–1960) – Scottish suffragist, member of the WFL, and only Scottish woman who stood for election when UK elections were opened to women in 1918
- Flora Murray (1869–1923) – Scottish physician and suffragette
- Frances Murray (1843–1919) – Scottish suffragist, advocate of women's education, lecturer in Scottish music and a writer, member of the WFL
- Jessie Murray (1867–1920) – British psychoanalyst and suffragette, member of the WFL
- Sylvia Murray (1875–1955) – suffragette and author, the sister of suffragette Eunice Guthrie Murray
- Margaret Mylne (1806–1892) – Scottish suffragette and writer

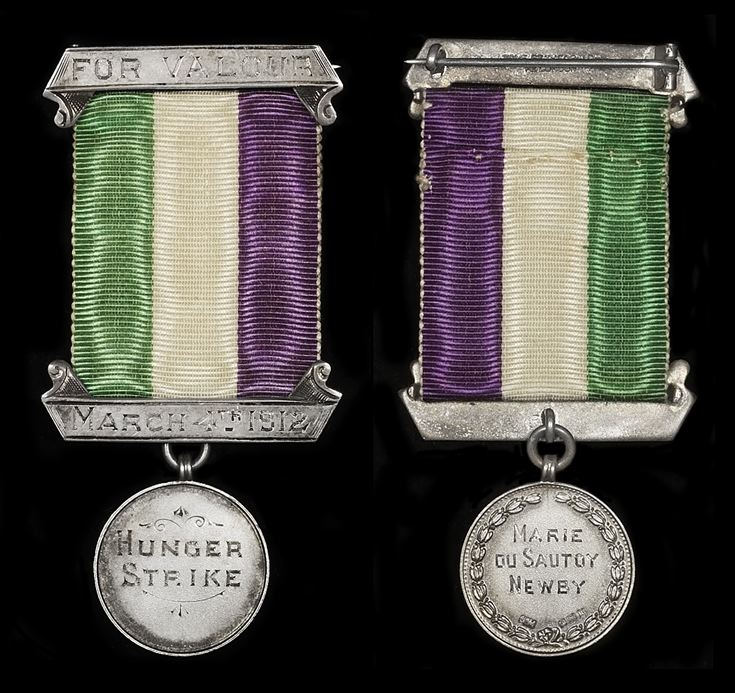
Hunger Strike Medal awarded to Marie du Sautoy Newby

=== N ===
- Marie Naylor (1856–1940) – British artist and suffragette
- Jessie Newbery (1864–1948) – Scottish artist and embroiderer, member of the Women's Social and Political Union
- Clara Neal (1870–1936) – English teacher, suffragette and co-founder of the Swansea branch of the WFLin 1909
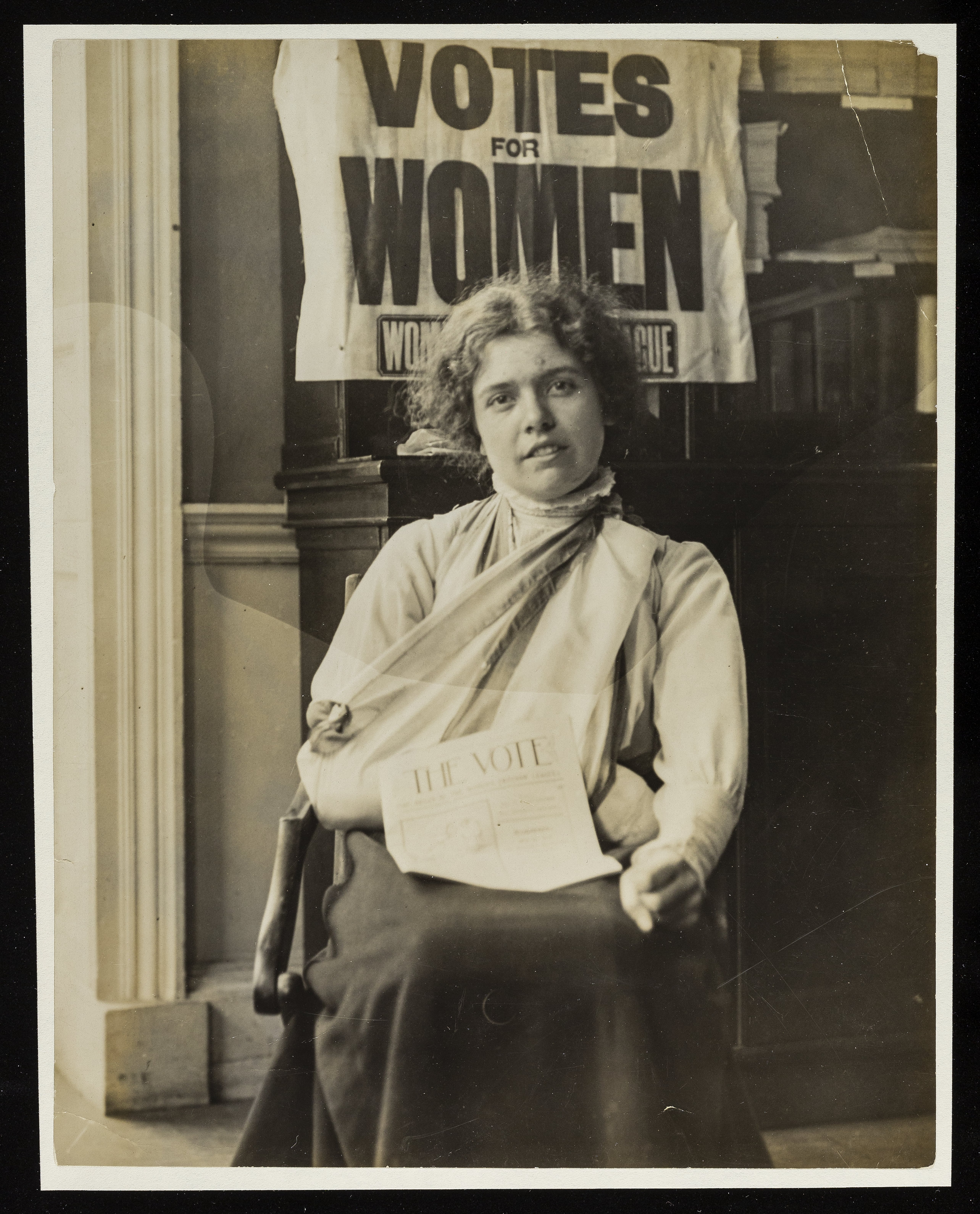
- Alison Neilans
  Mary Neal (1860–1944) – English social worker, suffragette and collector of English folk dances
- Elizabeth Neesom (c. 1797/98 – 1866) – prominent English Radical and Chartist
- Dorinda Neligan (1833–1914) – Irish-born English headmistress and suffragette
- Margaret Nevinson (1858–1932) – English suffragist, Justice of the Peace, Poor Law guardian and playwright, member of the Church League for Women's Suffragem WSPU and WFL
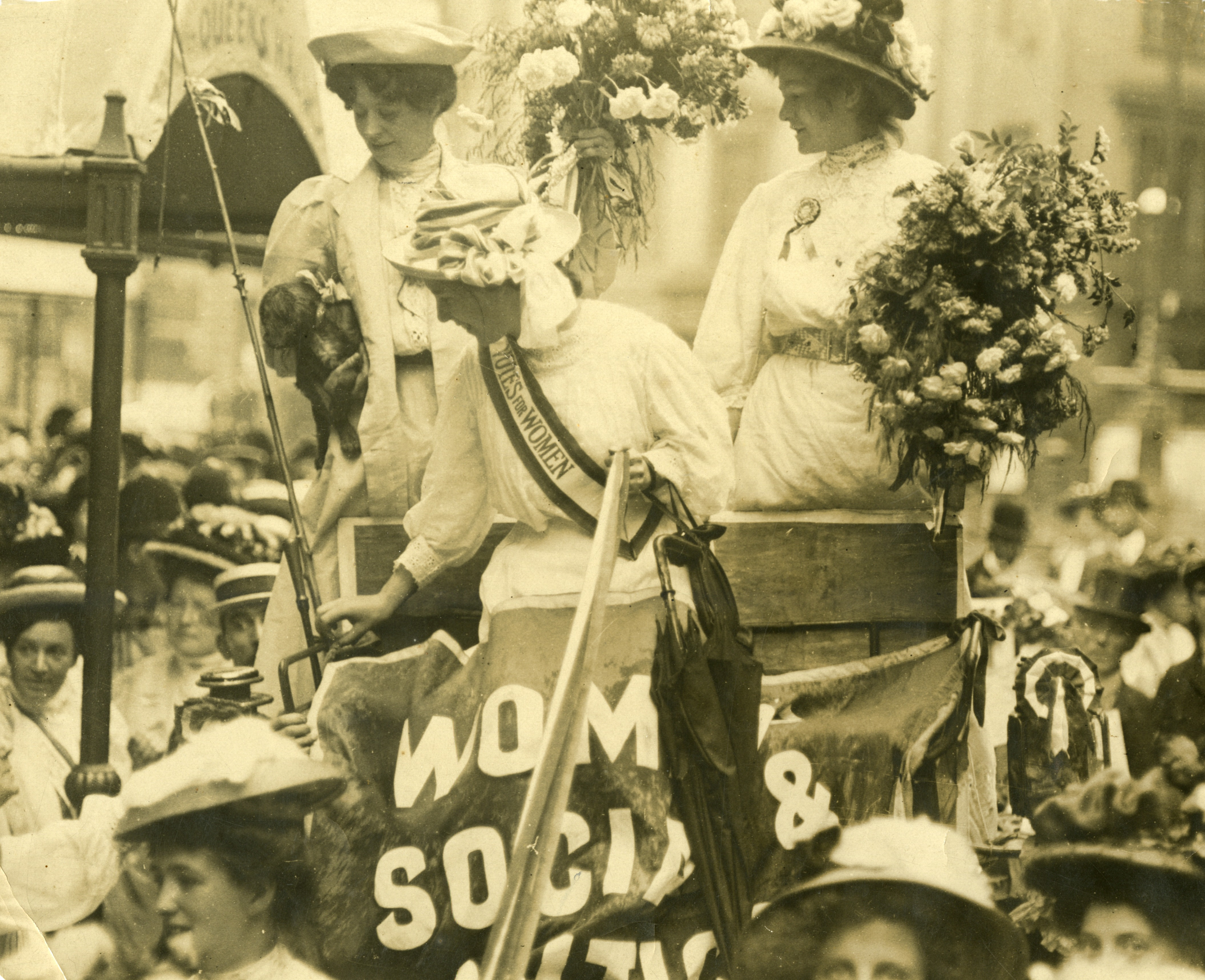
- Edith New and Mary Leigh in 1908
  Edith New (1877–1951) – English suffragette who was one of the first two suffragettes to use vandalism as a tactic, chained herself to the railings of 10 Downing Street alongside Olivia Smith, shouting "Votes for Women!"
- Marie du Sautoy Newby (1880–1962) – English suffragette awarded the Hunger Strike Medal
- Harriet Christina Newcomb – English feminist, activist, and educationist, member of the WFL, active in Australia and Britain
- Alison Neilans (1884–1942) – English suffragette, member of the executive committee of the WFL and member of the Church League for Women's Suffrage, the International Woman Suffrage Alliance and the East London Federation of Suffragettes, imprisoned for trying to pour fluid into a by-election ballot box
- Jessie Newbery (1864–1948) – Scottish artist and suffragist
- Elizabeth Pease Nicholl (1807–1897) – English abolitionist, anti-segregationist, suffragist, chartist and anti-vivisectionist
- Bertha Nordenson (1857–1928) – English-born Swedish suffragist, member of the National Association for Women's Suffrage, helped to organize the Sixth Conference of the International Woman Suffrage Alliance which was held in Stockholm
- Priscilla Norman (1883–1964) – British activist and suffragist, member of the Liberal Women's Suffrage Union

=== O ===
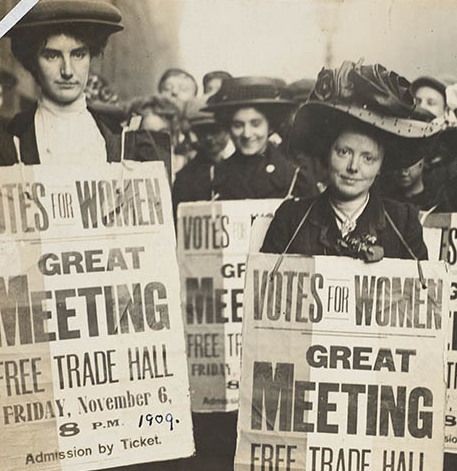
Helen Ogston and Mary Gawthorpe c. 1906-1909

- Helen Ogston (1882–1973) – Scottish suffragette known for interrupting David Lloyd George on 5 December 1908 at a meeting in the Royal Albert Hall and subsequently holding off the stewards with a dog whip, paid organiser for the New Constitutional Society for Women's Suffrage
- Emily Rosaline Orme (1835–1915) – Scottish suffragist, member of the Edinburgh National Society for Women's Suffrage

=== P ===
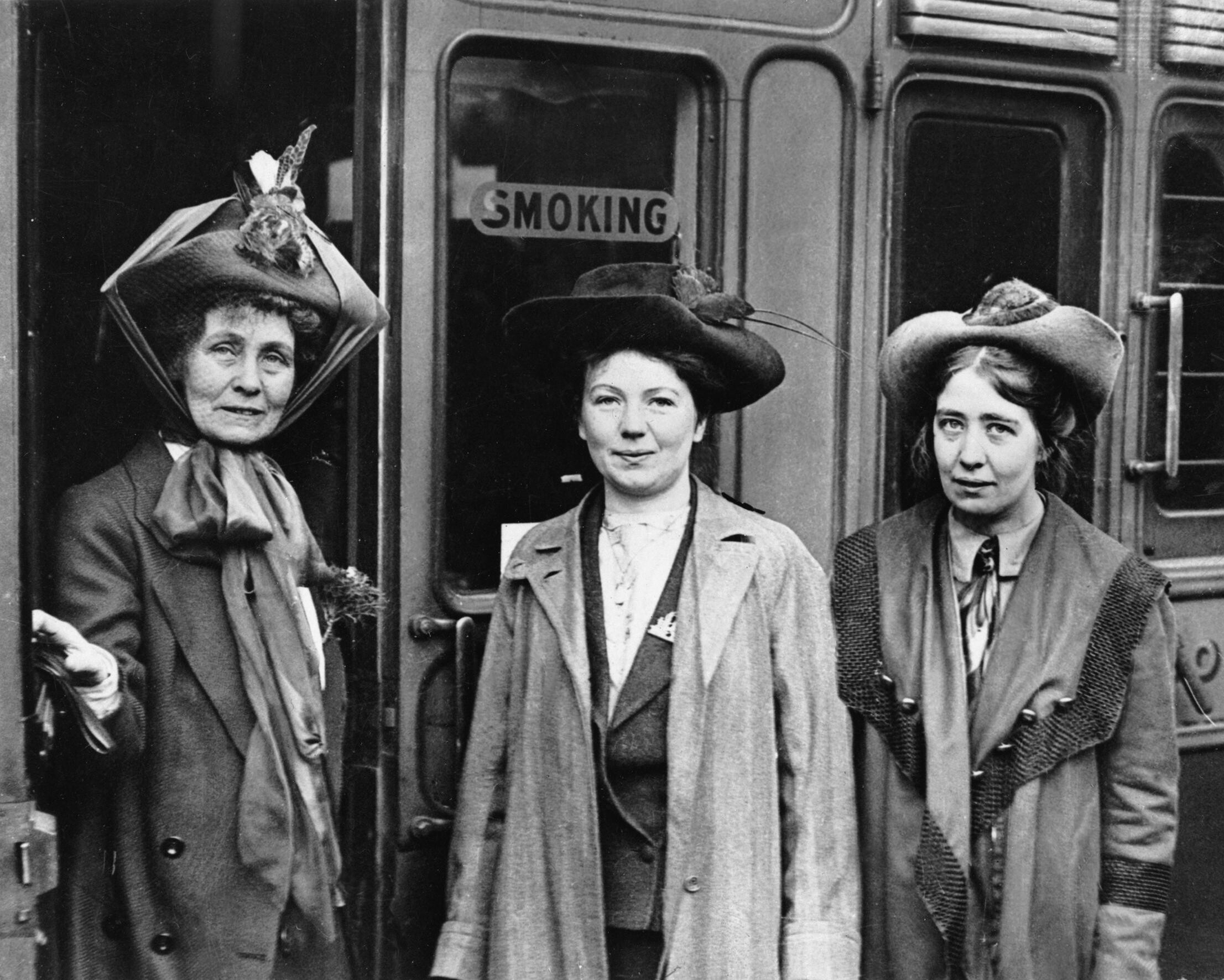
- Emmeline Pankhurst (left) and Christabel Pankhurst (centre) and Sylvia Pankhurst at Waterloo Station in 1911
  Elizabeth Margaret Pace (1866–1957) – Scottish doctor, suffragist and advocate for women's health and women's rights, founder member of the Glasgow and West of Scotland Association for Women's Suffrage
- Adela Pankhurst (1885–1961) – British-Australian suffragette and political organizer, co-founder of the Communist Party of Australia and the Australia First Movement
- Christabel Pankhurst (1880–1958) – British suffragette, co-founder and leader of the WSPU
- Emmeline Pankhurst (1858–1928) – British suffragette, founder and the leader of the British Suffragette Movement
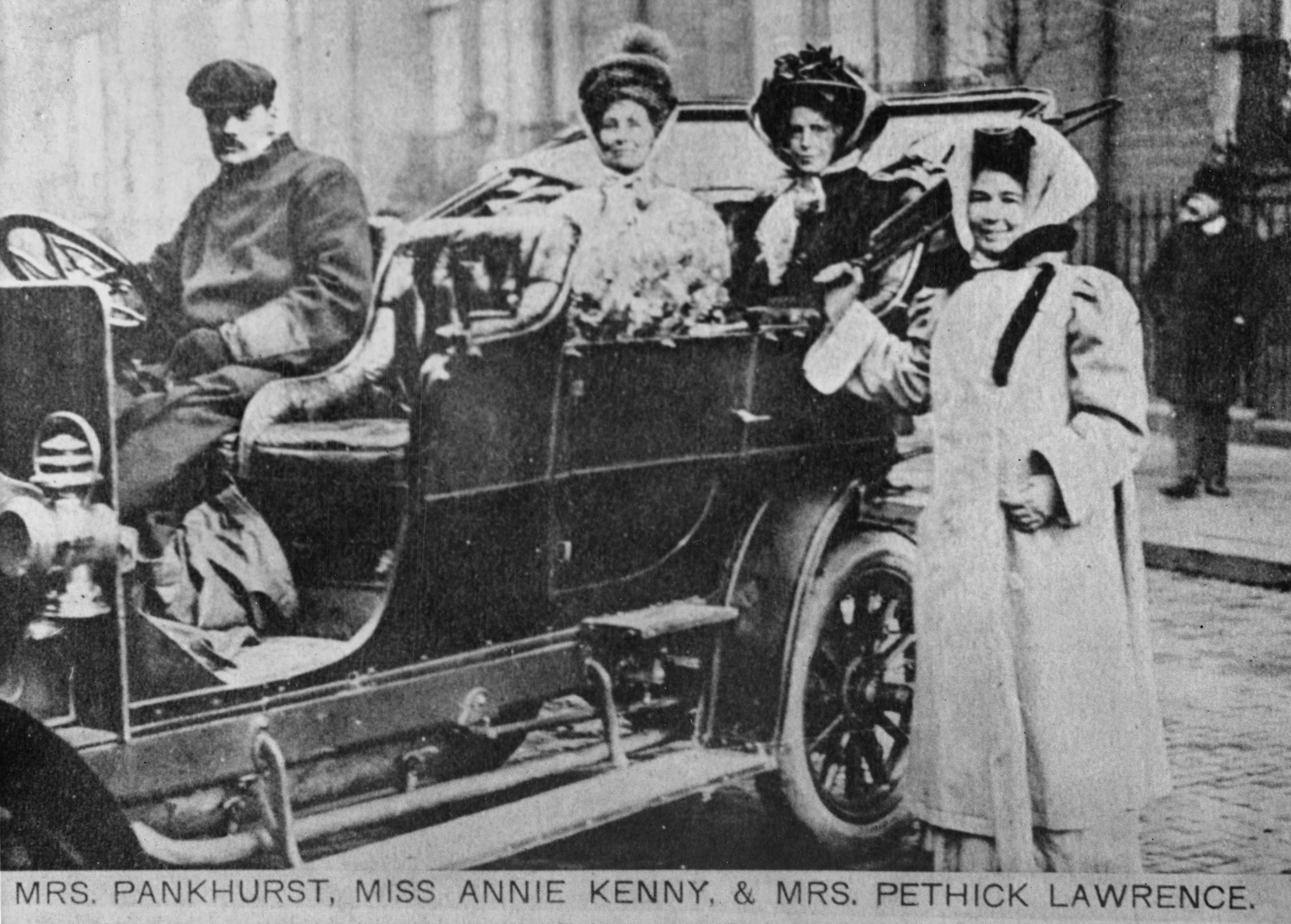
  Emmeline Pankhurst, Annie Kenny and Emmeline Pethick-Lawrence c. 1912
- Richard Pankhurst – British barrister, politician and supporter of women's suffrage, member of the committee of the Manchester Society for Women's Suffrage, married to Emmeline Pankhurst
- Sylvia Pankhurst (1882–1960) – British suffragette, socialist and anti-fascism activist
- Frances Mary "Fanny" Parker (1875–1924) – New Zealand-born suffragette prominent in the militant wing of the Scottish women's suffrage movement, repeatedly imprisoned for her actions
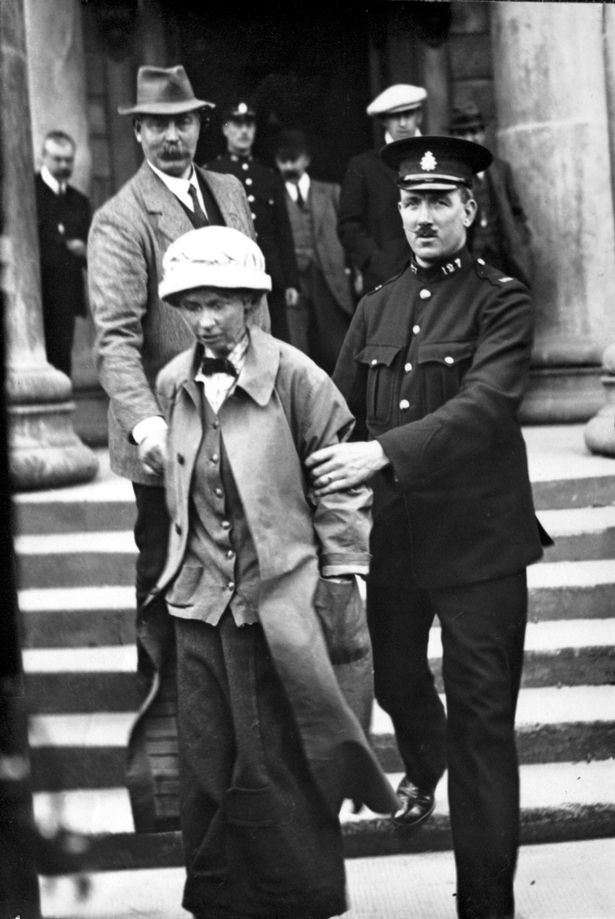
- Fanny Parker outside Ayr Sheriff Court in 1914
  Daisy Parsons (1890–1957) – British suffragette and mayor, member of the East London Federation of Suffragettes (ELFS), part of a delegation to the Prime Minister in 1914
- Grace Paterson (1843–1925) – Scottish school board member, temperance activist, suffragist, and founder of the Glasgow School of Cookery
- Jessie Payne (1864–1933) – British suffragette, member of the ELFS, part of a delegation to the Prime Minister in 1914
- Isabella Bream Pearce (1859–1929) – Scottish socialist propagandist and suffrage campaigner
- Annie Seymour Pearson (born 1878) – British suffrage activist who ran a safe house for suffragettes evading police
- Fanny Pease (1866–1946) – British civilian and military nurse, suffragette, arrested for window smashing
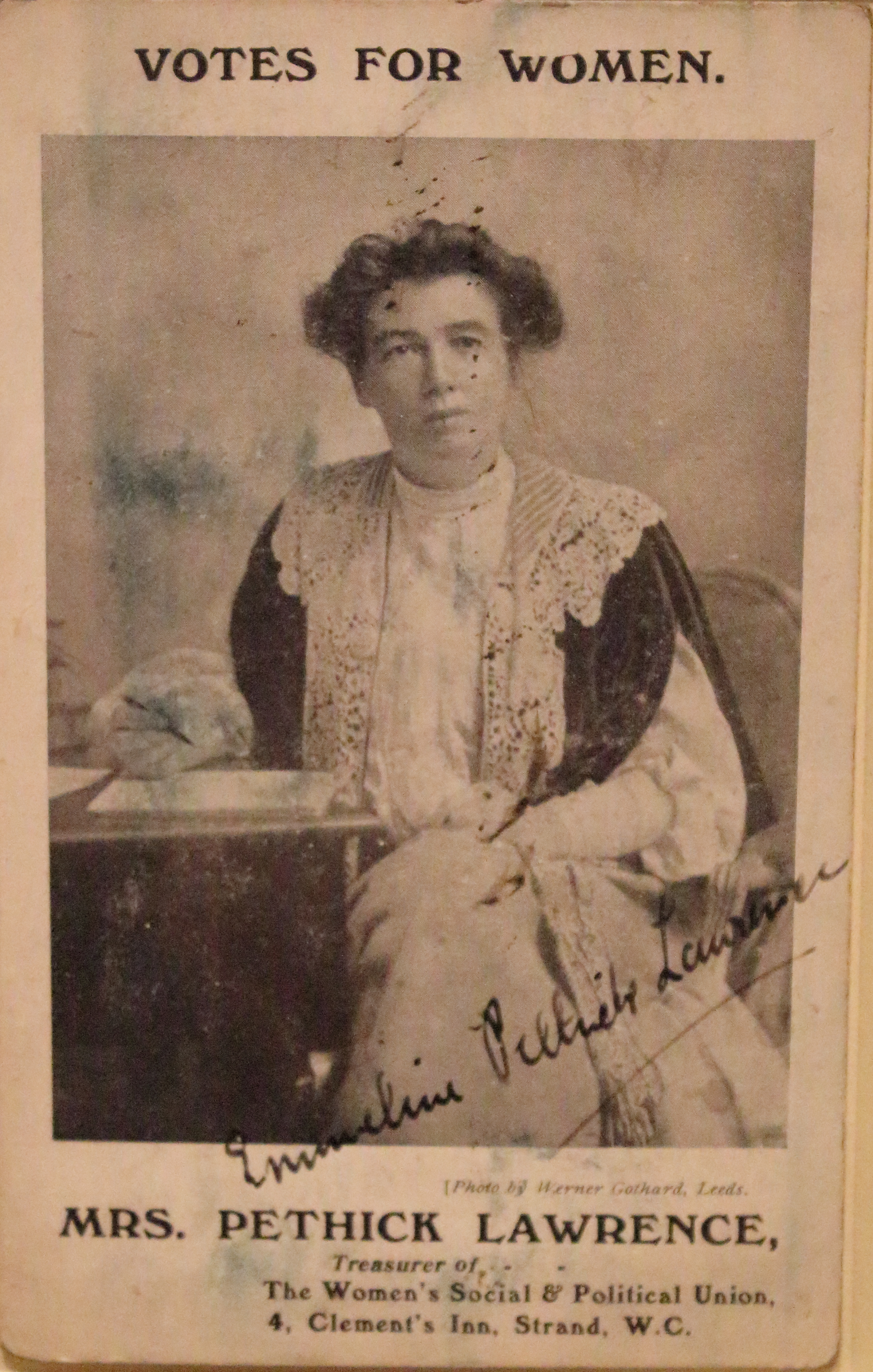
  Signed postcard of Emmeline Pethick Lawrence c. 1907
- Edith Pechey (1845–1908) – English doctor and campaigner for women's rights, involved in a range of social causes
- Pleasance Pendred (1864–1948) – British suffragette
- Alice Jane Gray Perkins (1865–1948) – American-born suffragist, writer and teacher who worked in both America and the UK
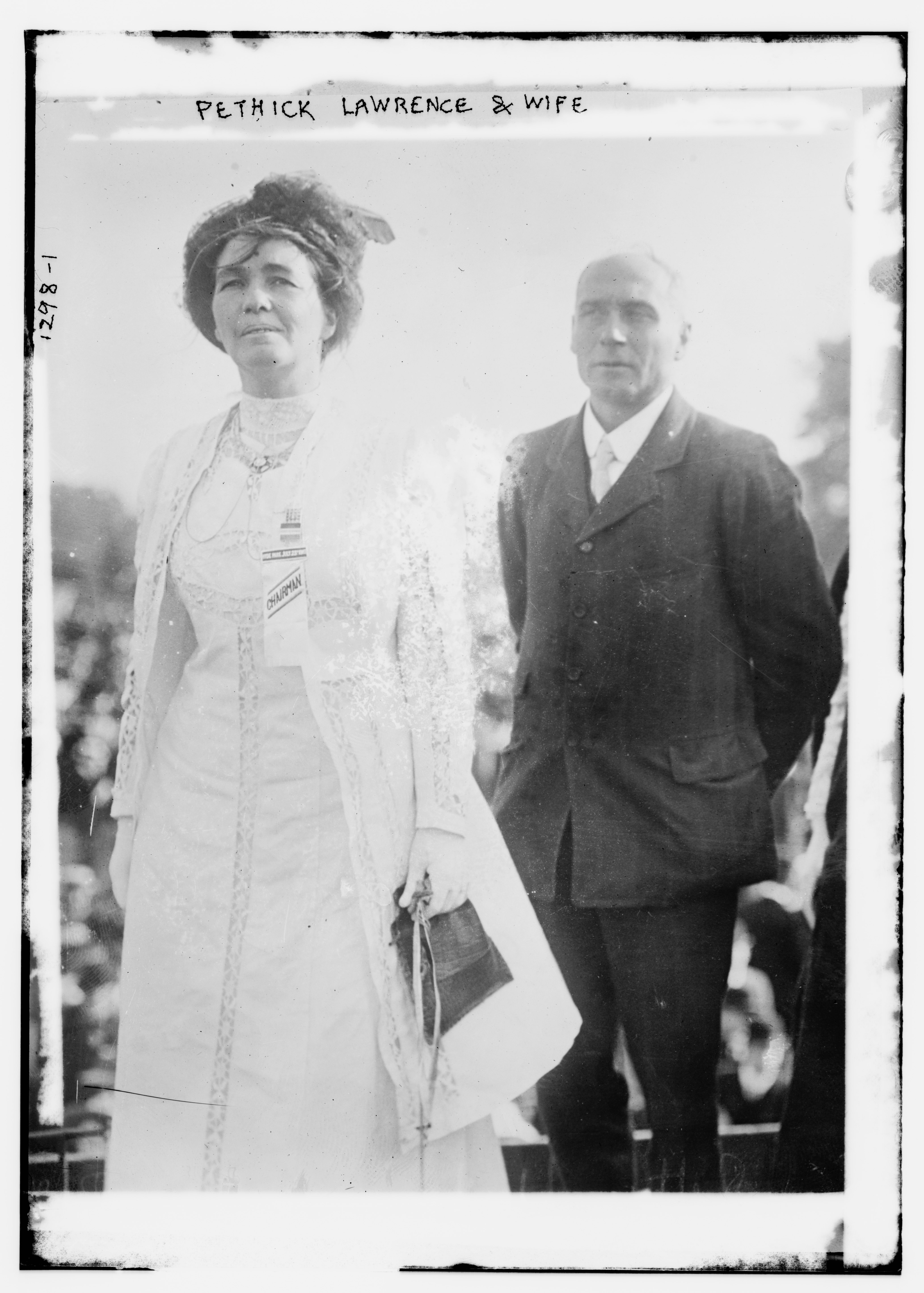
- Emmeline Pethick-Lawrence and Frederick William Lawrence
  Emmeline Pethick-Lawrence (1867–1954) – British suffragist and pacifist, member of the Suffrage Society, treasurer of the WSPU, organised the WSPU's first Week of Self-Denial with Beatrice Sanders, founded and edited the publication Votes for Women with her husband, left the WSPU to form the United Suffragists over disagreements about the more radical forms of activism
- Frederick Pethick-Lawrence – British Labour politician and editor who campaigned for women's suffrage
- Dorothy Pethick (1881–1970) – British suffragette, member of the WSPU, younger sister of Emmeline Pethick-Lawrence
- Emily Jane Pfeiffer – Welsh feminist poet and philanthropist who supported women's suffrage and higher education for women
- Leonora Philipps (1862–1915) – British Liberal suffragist, president of Welsh Union of Women's Liberal Associations and co-founder of the Pioneer Club
- Mary Phillips (1880–1969), English suffragette, paid official of the Glasgow and West of Scotland Association for Women's Suffrage, then established a Glasgow branch of the WSPU
- Emily Phipps (1865–1943) – English teacher, barrister and suffragette, member of the WFL
- Caroline Phillips (1874–1956) – Scottish feminist, suffragette, journalist and honorary secretary of the Aberdeen branch of the WSPU
- Edith Picton-Turbervill (1872–1960) – English social reformer, suffragist, writer and Labour Party politician
- Catherine Pine (1864–1941) – British nurse and suffragette
- Ellen Pitfield (1857–1912) – suffragette who sustained injuries at Black Friday and who set a fire at the King Edward Street Post office in London; was arrested and released after the Men's Political Union for Women's Enfranchisement started a petition on her behalf
- Isabella Potbury (1890–1965) – portrait painter, suffragette
- Miriam Pratt (1893–1975) – British suffragette and arsonist
- Aileen Preston (1889–1974) – Anglo-Irish suffragette, Emmeline Pankhurst's chauffeur and the first woman in history to qualify for the Automobile Association Certificate in Driving
- Catherine Prichard (1842–1909) – Welsh poet and suffragette

=== R ===
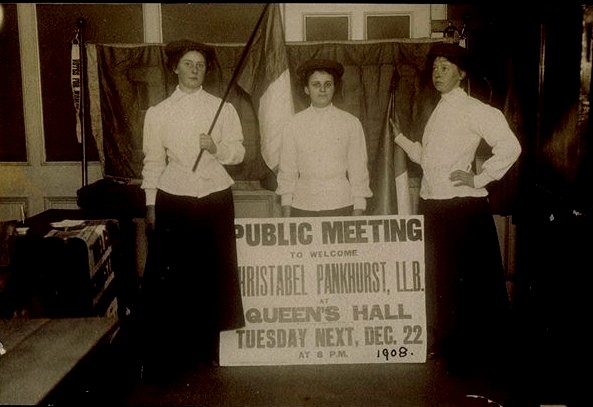
Charlotte Marsh, Dorothy Hartopp Radcliffe and Elsa Gye in 1908

- Clara Rackham (1875–1966) – English magistrate, prison reformer, factory inspector, long-serving alderman and city councillor in Cambridge, member of the Cambridge Women's Suffrage Association
- Dorothy Hartopp Radcliffe (1887–1959) – British suffragette, member of the WSPU, and later a Carmelite nun
- Jane Rae (1872–1959) – Scottish political activist, suffragette, councillor and justice of the peace
- Katherine Raleigh (1852–1922) – English classics scholar, suffragist, tax resister and local organiser in Uxbridge
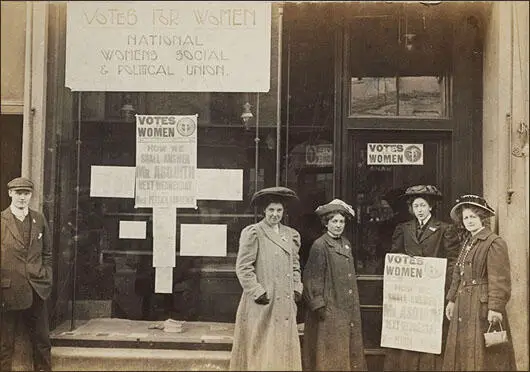
  Theresa Garnett, Nelly Crocker, Gladys Roberts and Edith New in 1909
- Eleanor Rathbone (1872–1946) – campaigner for women's rights and independent Member of Parliament; member of the Liverpool Women's Suffrage Society and the NUWSS, wrote articles for The Common Cause
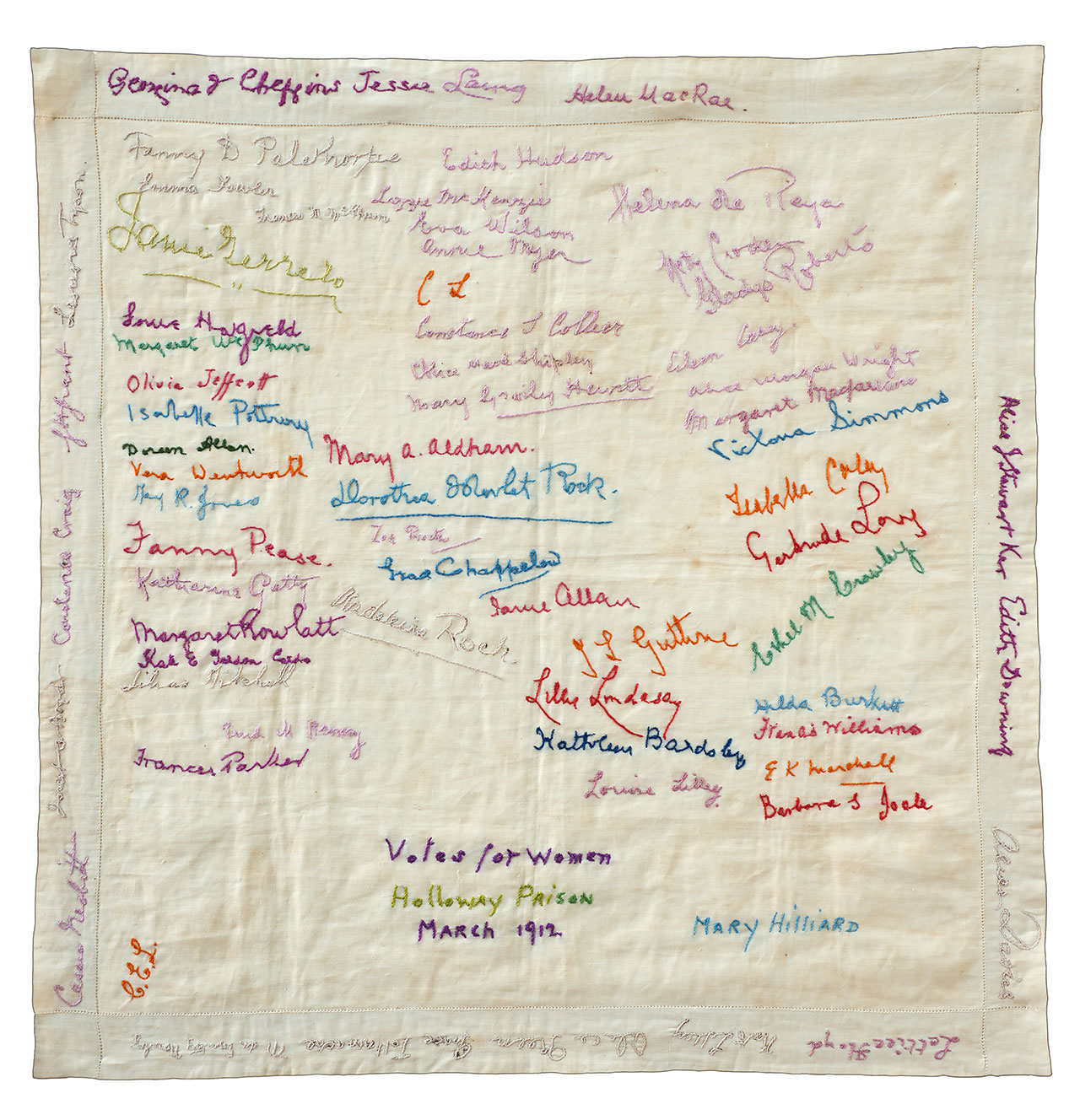
- The Suffragette Handkerchief
  Marion Kirkland Reid (1815–1902) – Scottish feminist and writer, her book A Plea for Woman was significant in the early years of the women's suffrage movement in the United States
- Olwen Rhys (1876–1953) – Welsh scholar and suffragist; secretary to the committee of the Oxford Women's Suffrage Society (OWSS)
- Mary Richardson (1882–1961) – Canadian-born suffragette, arsonist, head of the women's section of the British Union of Fascists
- Edith Rigby (1872–1948) – English suffragette and arsonist; founder of St. Peter's School in Preston
- Gladys Roberts (c. 1887/1888–1975), English suffragette and WSPU campaigner, went on hunger strike and has name embroidered on the Suffragette Handkerchief
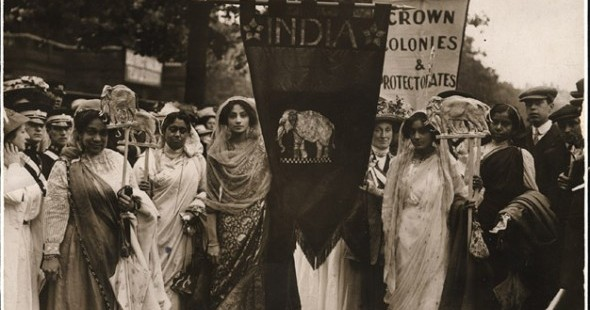
- British Indian suffragists on the Women's Coronation Procession of 1911, including Bhagwati Bhola Nauth and Lolita Roy on the left
  Margaret Robertson (1892–1967) – British politician, suffragist and teacher; organiser of the Election Fighting Fund
- Elizabeth Robins (1862–1952) – American-born Ibsen actress, playwright, public speaker, and novelist, member of the WSPU and NUWSS, campaigned in Sussex
- Annot Robinson (1874–1925) – Scottish pacifist and suffragette, member of the WSPU, nicknamed Annie
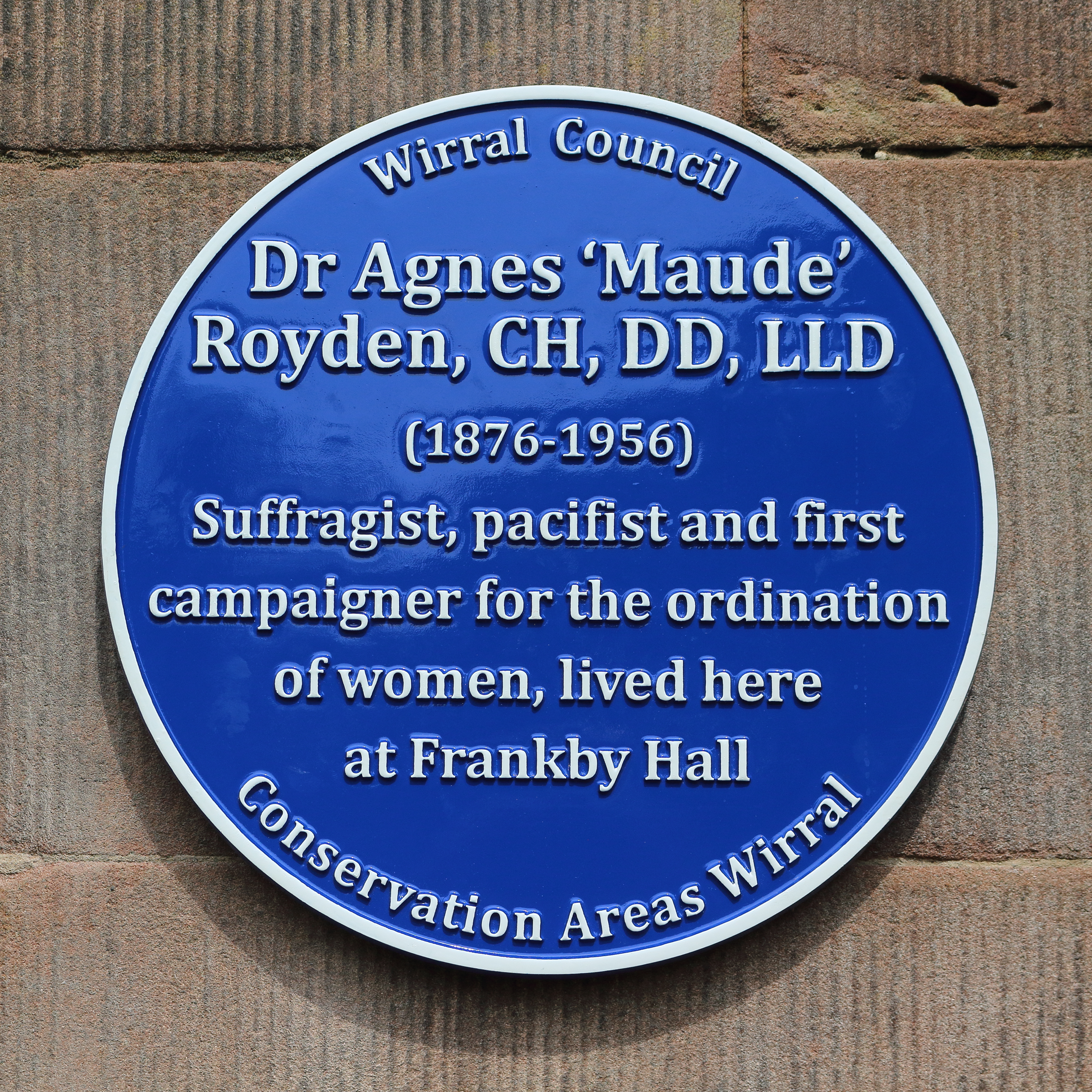
- Plaque to Maude Royden at Frankby Cemetery
  Rona Robinson (1881–1973) – British chemist and suffragette, member of the WSPU and in 1905 the first woman in the United Kingdom to gain a first-class degree in chemistry
- Esther Roper (1868–1938) – English suffragist, held the salaried position of secretary of the Manchester National Society for Women’s Suffrage
- Lolita Roy (born 1865) – believed to have been an important organizer of the Women's Coronation Procession (a suffrage march in London) in 1911, and marched as part of it with either her sisters or daughters
- Maude Royden (1876–1956) – English preacher, suffragist and campaigner for the ordination of women, member of the NUWSS and CLWS, member of the executive committee for the London Society of Women's Suffrage, editor of The Common Cause newspaper, attended the Eighth Conference of the International Woman Suffrage Alliance
- Bertha Ryland (1882–1977) – English suffragette and member of the WSPU who slashed a painting in Birmingham Art Gallery in 1914, went on hunger strike in Winson Green Prison in Birmingham

=== S ===
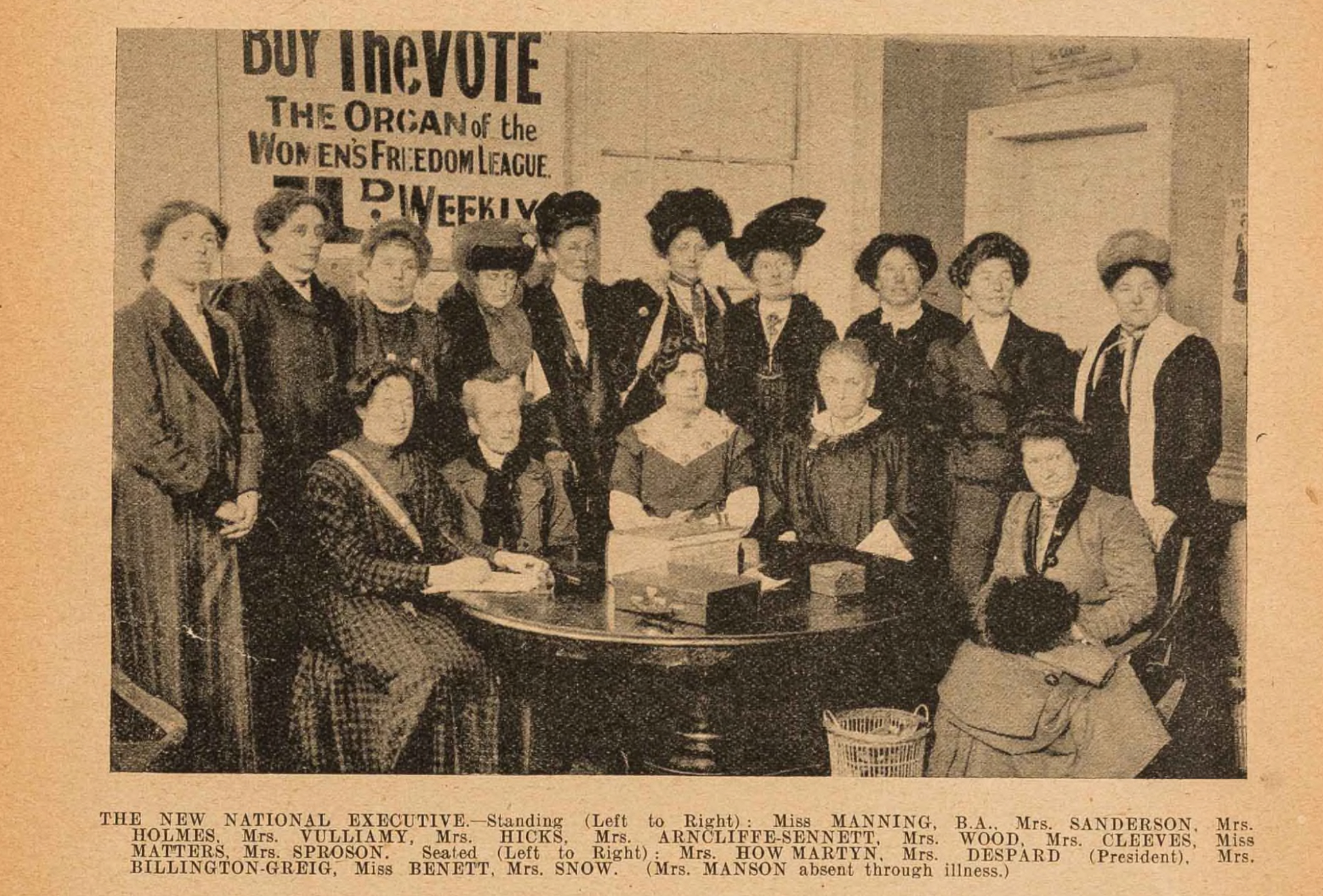
- Executive Committee of Women’s Freedom League (WFL), including Teresa Billington-Greig, Edith How-Martyn, Amy Sanderson and Emma Sproson in 1910
  Lavena Saltonstall (1881–1957) – English suffragette, activist for the Women's Labour League and WSPU and writer of column "The Letters of a Tailoress" for the Halifax Guardian
- Louise Samuel (1870–1925) – English suffragist and charity worker
- Amy Sanderson (born c. 1875-6) – Scottish suffragette, imprisoned twice, executive member of WFL
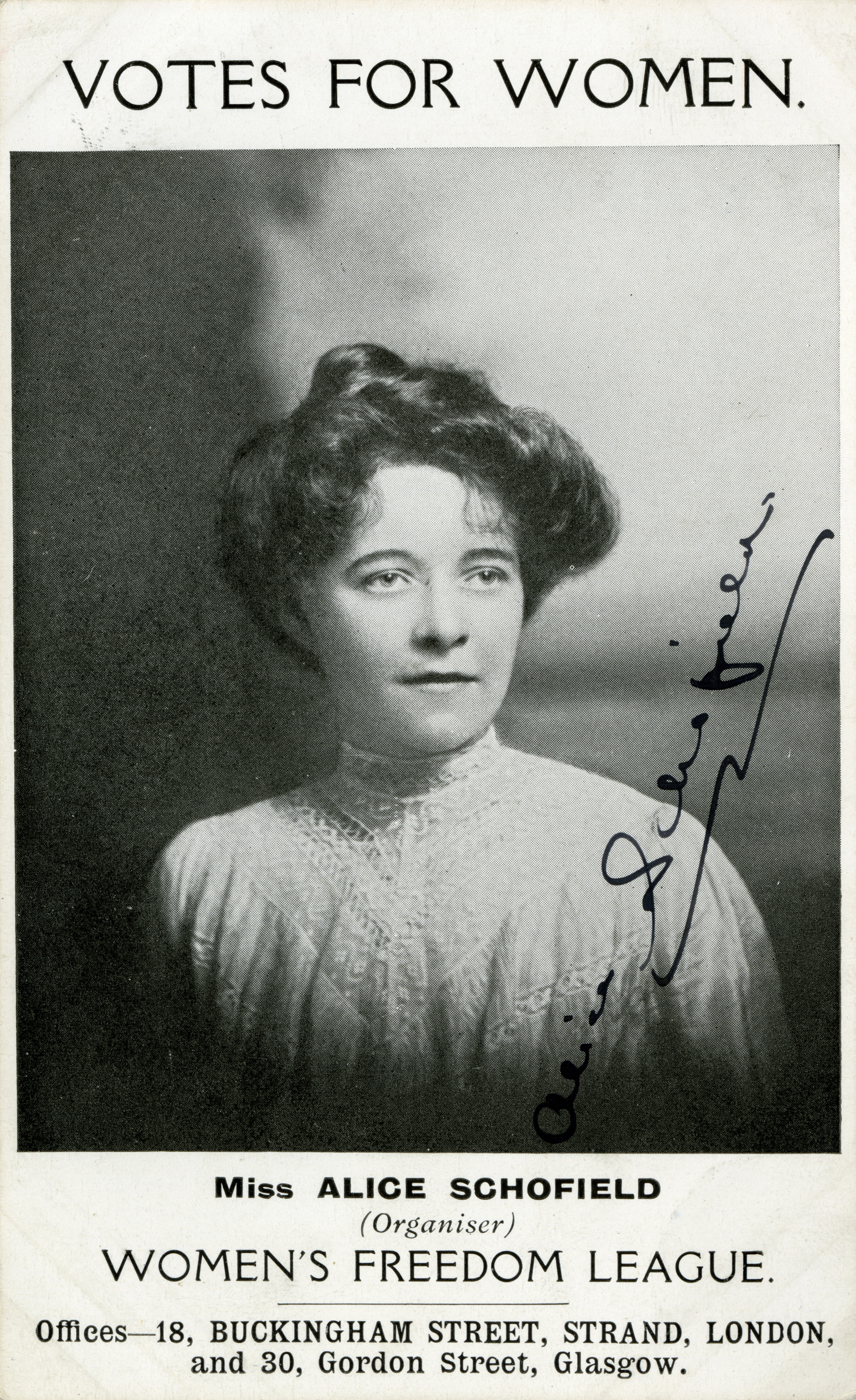
  Alice Schofield in 1907
- Mathilde Wolff Van Sandau (1843–1926) – German-born British suffragette, member of the WSPU and went on hunger strike
- Margaret Mansfield, Baroness Sandhurst (1828–1892) – British suffragist and spiritualist, one of the first women elected to a city council in the United Kingdom
- Jessie Saxby (1842–1940) – Scottish author, folklorist and suffragette
- Alice Cliff Scatcherd (1842–1906) – early English suffragist
- Alice Schofield (1881–1975) – English suffragette and politician who was the first woman councillor in Middlesbrough
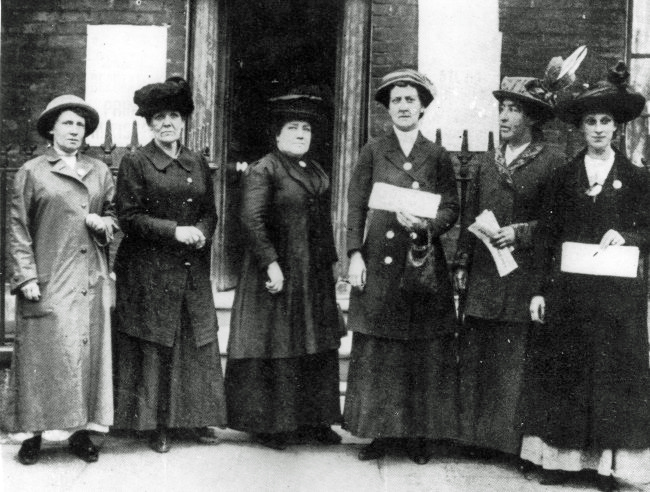
- Group of East London suffragettes, including Julia Scurr, Daisy Parsons and Jessie Payne
  Amelia Scott (1860–1952) – British suffragette, established "the ‘Leisure Hour Club for Young Women in Business" in Tunbridge Wells and participated in the suffrage "pilgrimage" to London organised by the Kentish Federation of Women’s Suffrage Societies
- Arabella Scott (1886–1980) – Scottish suffragette who endured five weeks of solitary confinement in Perth prison and force feeding twice a day
- Julia Scurr (1871–1927) – British suffragette and politician, member of the ELFS, part of a delegation to the Prime Minister in 1914
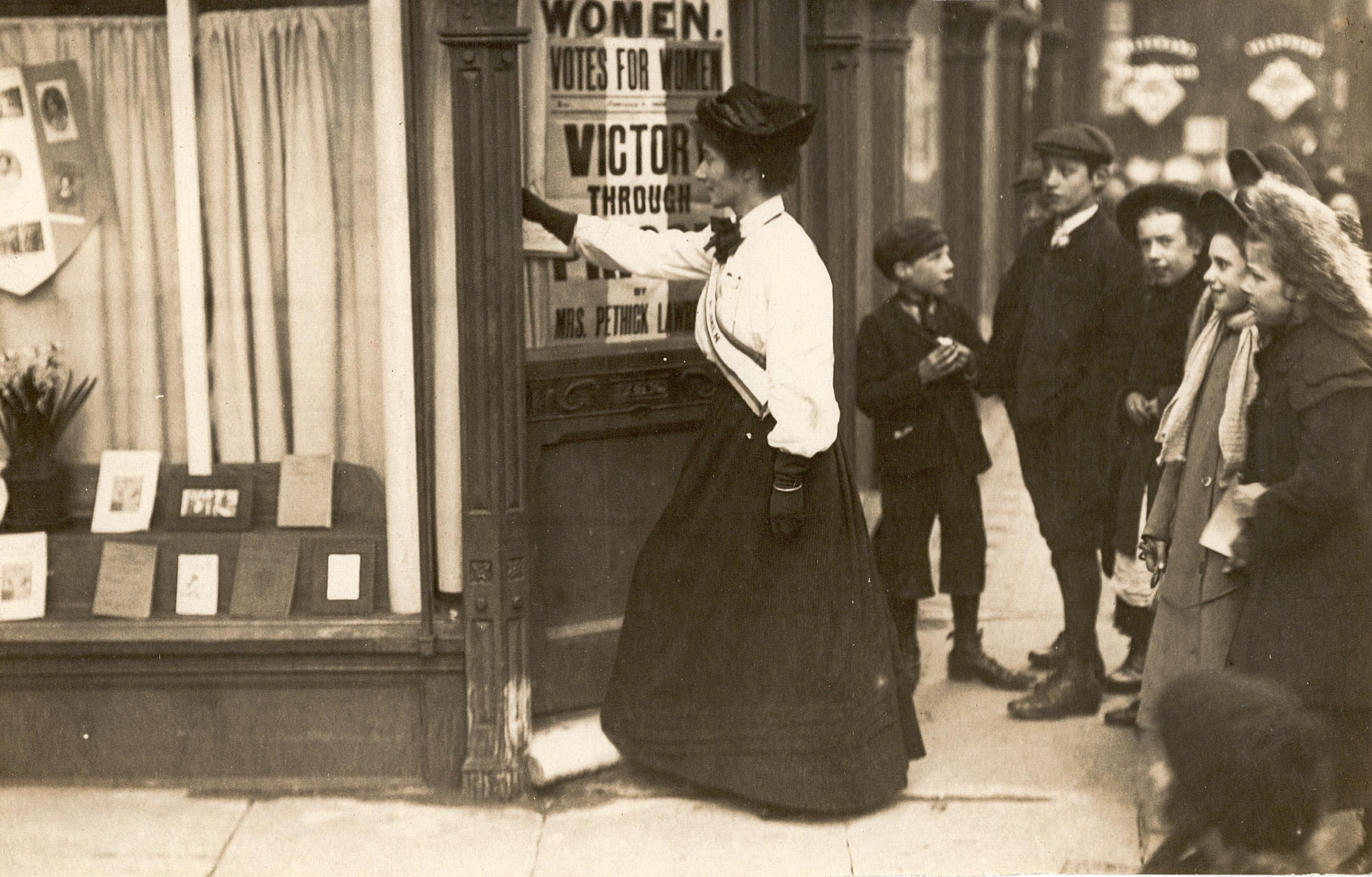
- Mary Sinclair entering the Kensington Women's Social and Political Union (WSPU) shop
  May Seaton-Tiedeman (1862–1948) – American-born campaigner in Britain for divorce law reform and suffrage, spoke in Hyde Park for women's suffrage celebrations
- Maud Arncliffe Sennett (1862–1936) – English actress and suffragist, member of the WFL and the Anti-Vivisection Society, arrested four times for her activism
- Isabel Seymour – English suffragette, employed by the WSPU and undertook speaking tours in Europe
- Evelyn Sharp (suffragist) (1869–1955) – English suffragist and journalist on The Manchester Guardian, short story writer, tax resister, founder of the United Suffragists
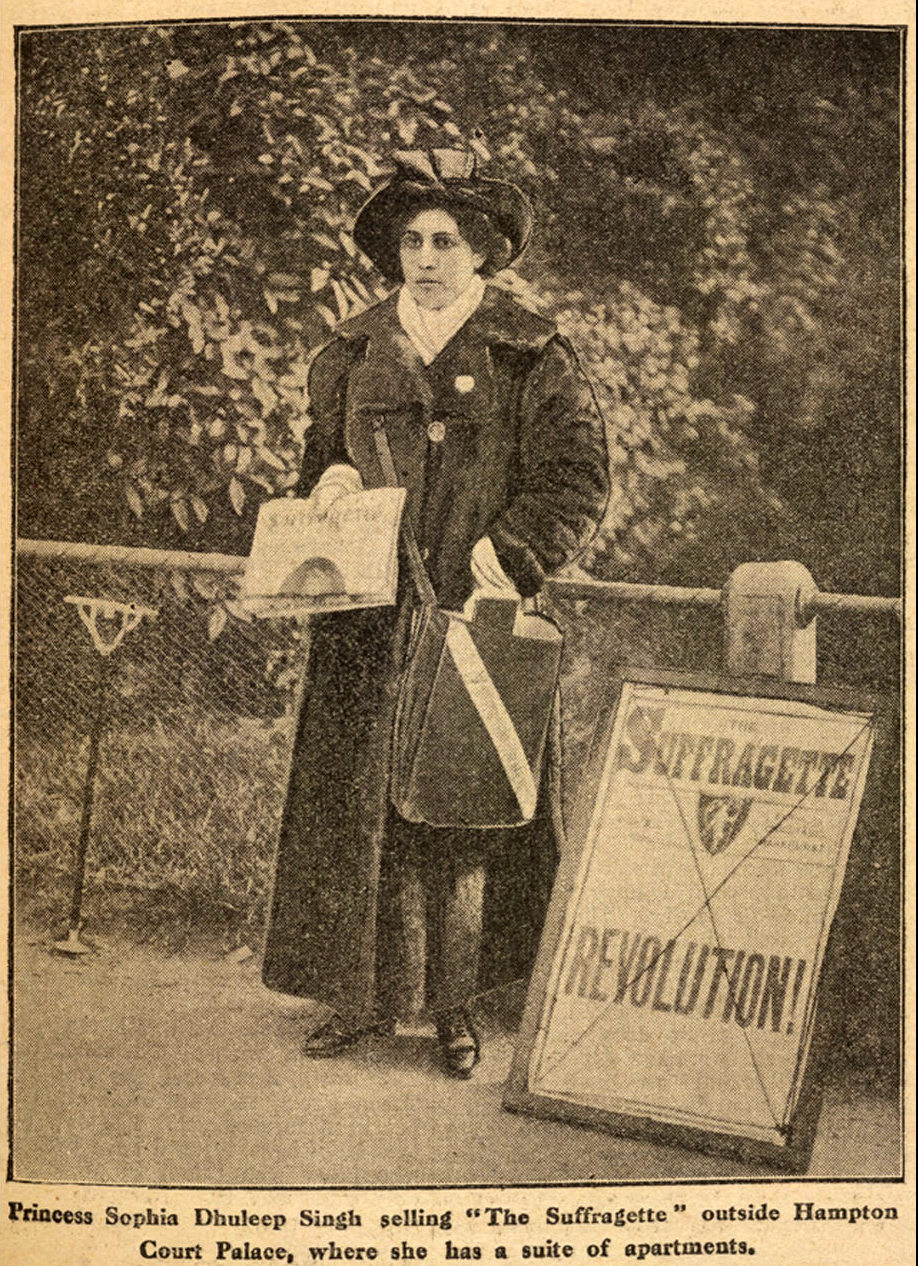
- Princess Sophia Duleep Singh selling The Suffragette newspaper in 1913
  Hanna Sheehy-Skeffington (1877–1946) – Irish suffragette and nationalist, a founder of the Irish Women's Franchise League (IWFL)
- Genie Sheppard (1863–1953) – British medical doctor and militant suffragette, member of the WSPU, awarded the hunger strike medal
- Alice Maud Shipley (1869–1951) – English suffragist who went on hunger strike in Holloway Prison and who was force fed
- Jane Short (1881 – aft. 1932) – British feminist and suffragette, was imprisoned and force fed, awarded the hunger strike medal
- Isabel Giberne Sieveking (1857–1936) – British suffragette and writer, member of the WSPU in Hastings
- Frances Simson (1854–1938) – Scottish suffragist, campaigner for women's higher education and one of the first of eight women graduates from the University of Edinburgh
- May Sinclair (1863–1946) – English writer and suffragist, member of the Woman Writers' Suffrage League
- Sophia Duleep Singh (1876–1948) – Suffragist and Princess who had leading roles in the Women's Tax Resistance League and the WSPU, contributed towards fundraising efforts and sold The Suffragette newspaper outside her home and from press carts
- Margaret Skinnider (1892–1971) – Irish–Scottish revolutionary and suffragette, protested at Perth Prison for women's suffrage
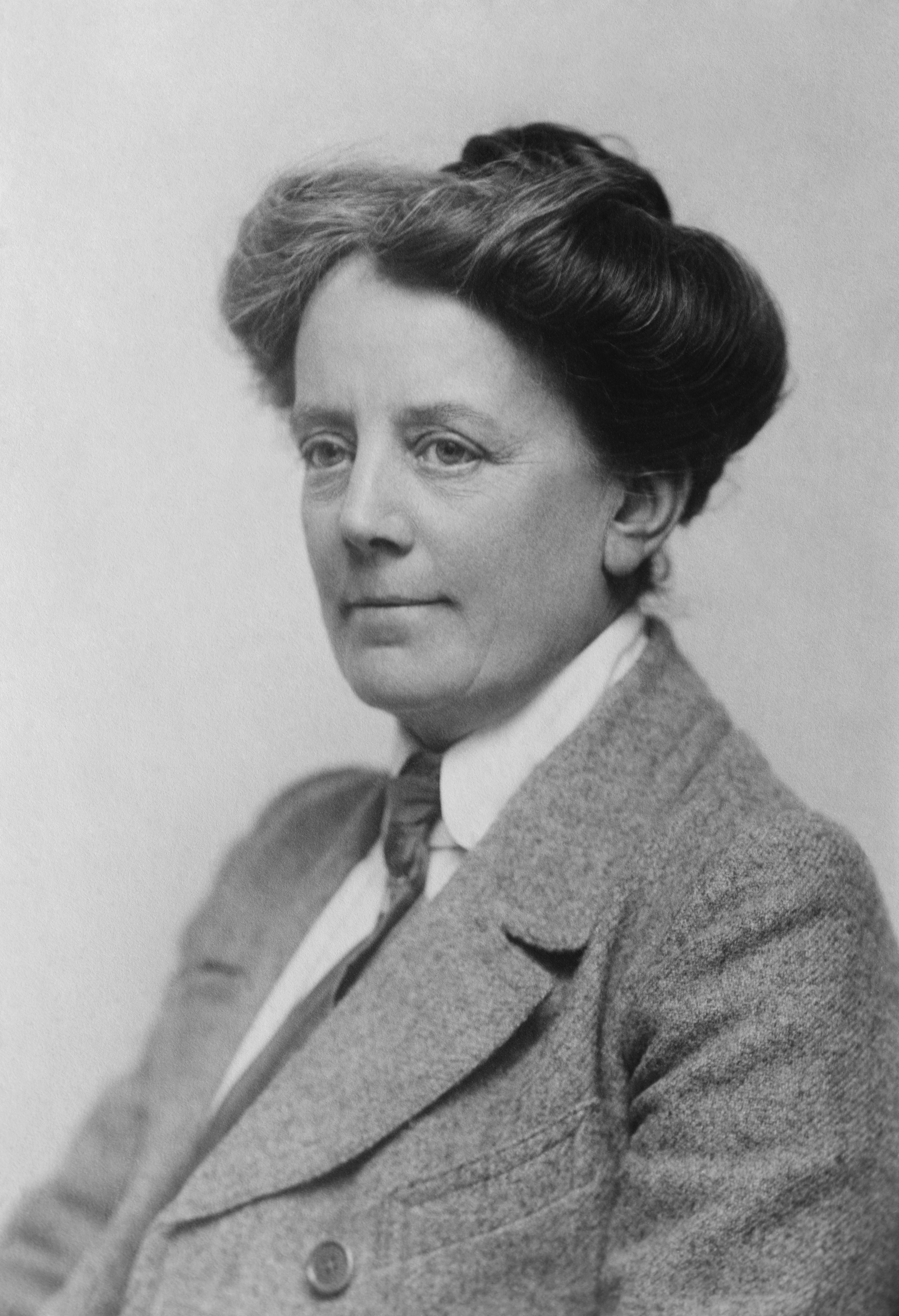
  Ethel Smyth, composer and suffragette
- Ethel Smyth (1858–1944) – English suffragette and composer of the suffrage anthem "The March of the Women"
- Norah Smyth (1874–1962) – British suffragette, photographer and politician, niece of Ethel Smyth
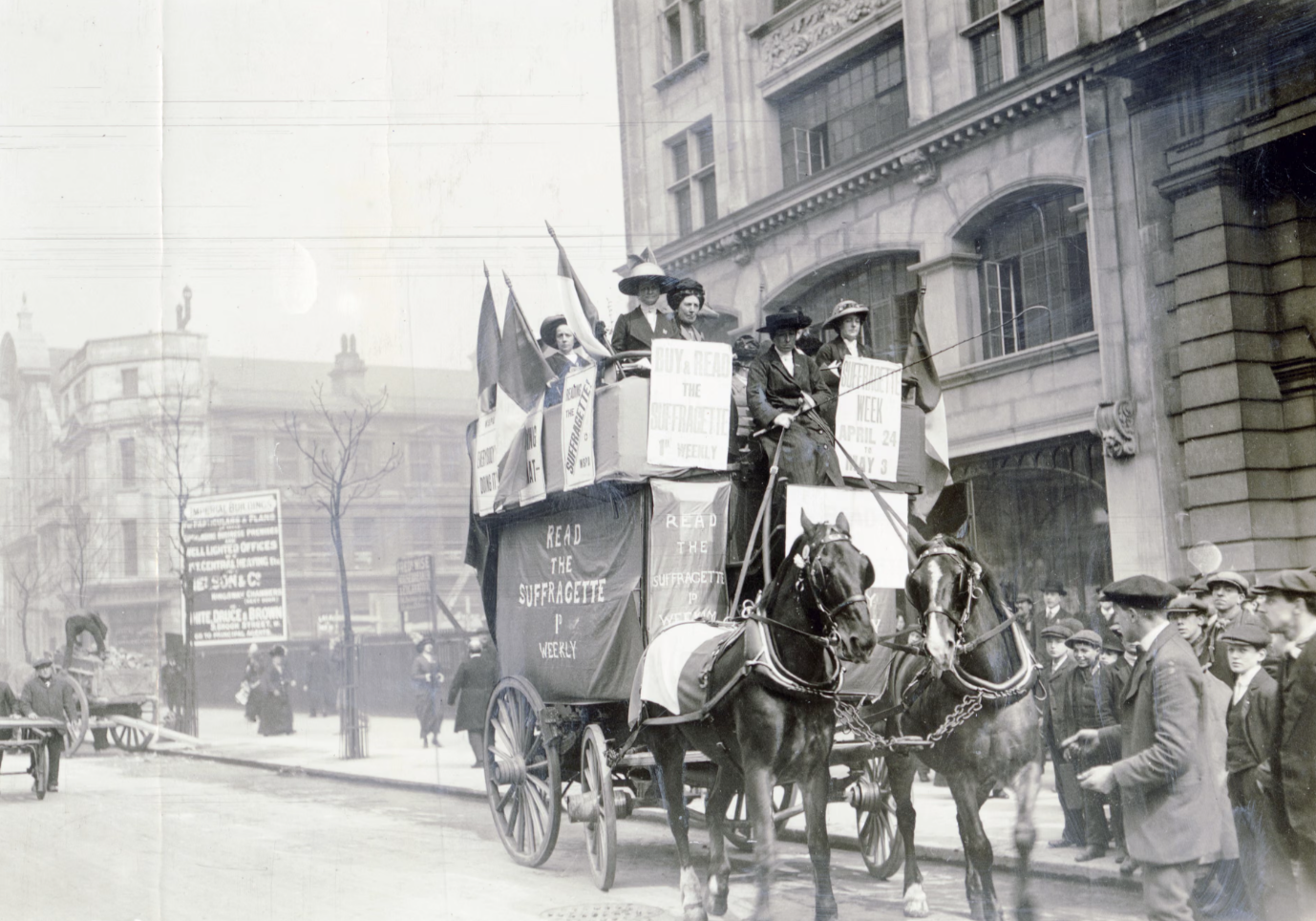
- Carriage advertising The Suffragette with Norah Smyth driving in 1912
  Mary Anderson Snodgrass (1862–1945) – Scottish politician, suffragist and advocate for women's rights, member of the Glasgow and West of Scotland Association for Women's Suffrage
- Ethel Snowden (1881–1951) – English socialist, human rights activist, feminist politician, national speaker for the NUWSS
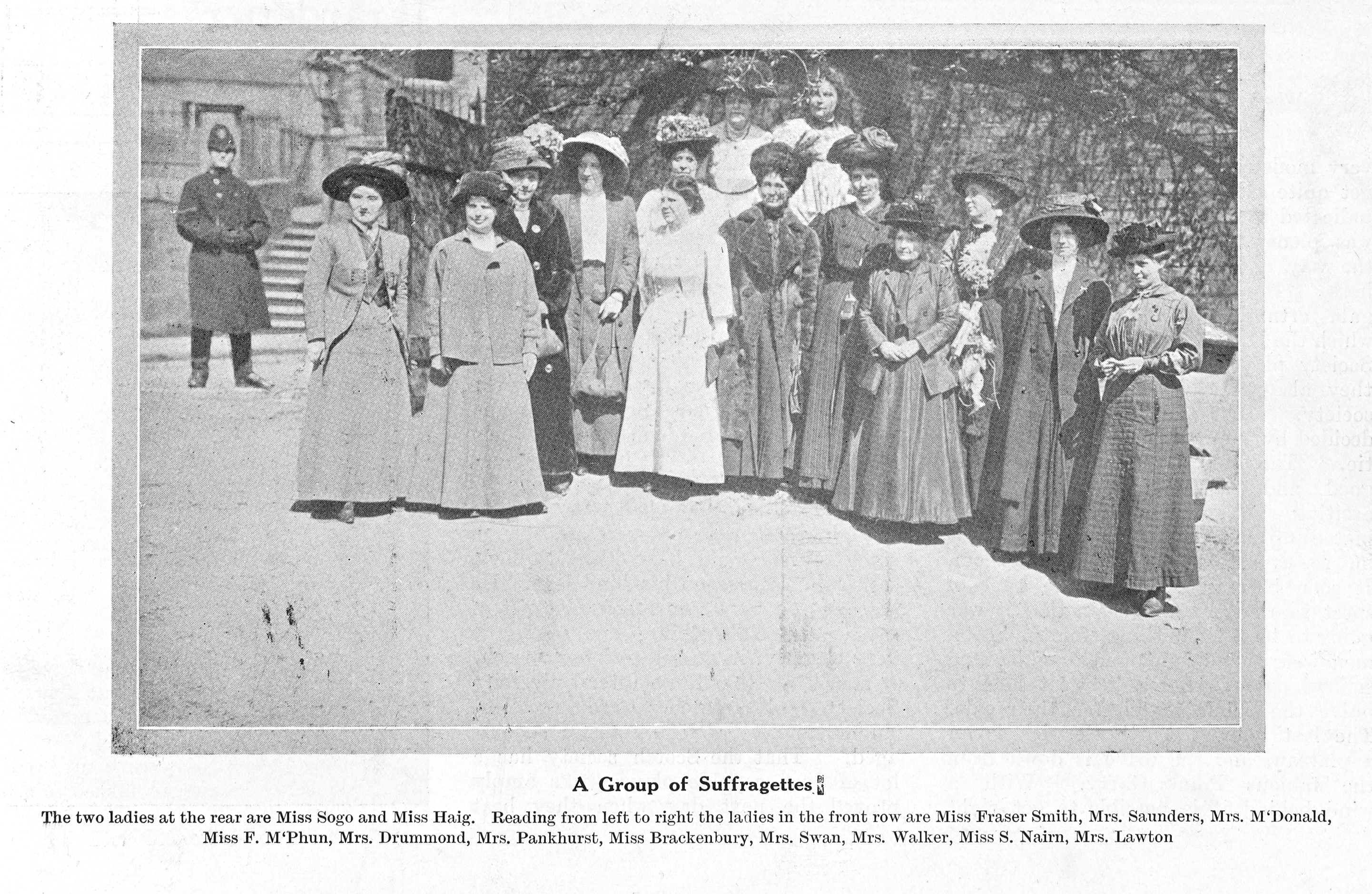
- A group of suffragettes at Bazaar in Glasgow (1910), including Jessie M. Soga, Frances McPhun, Annie S. Swan, Georgina Brackenbury and others
  Jessie M. Soga (1870–1954) – Xhosa/Scottish contralto singer, music teacher and suffragist. She was described as the only black suffrage campaigner based in Scotland and was a member of the WFL
- Daisy Solomon (1882–1978) – South African born suffragette, member of WSPU, sent as 'human letter' with Elspeth McClelland, daughter of Georgiana Solomon
- Georgiana Solomon (1844–1933) – Scottish philanthropist and suffragist, member of the WSPU and South African temperance movement
- Mary Somerville (1780–1872) – Scottish science writer and polymath
- Emma Sproson (1867–1936) – English suffragist, socialist, politician and women's rights activist, known as "Red Emma"
- Catherine Helen Spence (1825–1910) – Scottish-born Australian author, teacher, journalist, politician and leading suffragist
- Emily Spender (1841–1922) – English novelist and suffragette, honorary secretary of the Bath committee of the National Society for Women's Suffrage (NSWS)
- Edith Splatt (1873?–1945) – British dressmaker, journalist and councillor, member of the WSPU, wrote a column titled "Womanland" for Exeter's Express and Echo, the first woman to win a seat on Exeter City Council
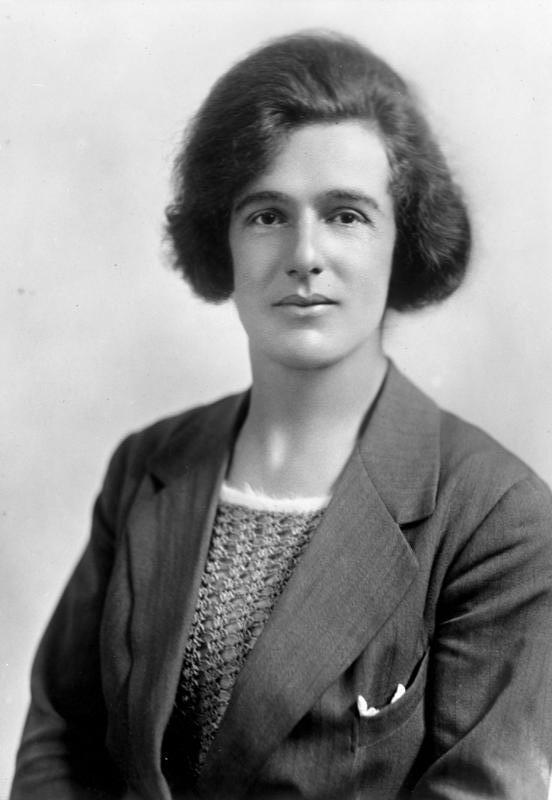
- Jessie Stephen in 1930
  Lady Barbara Steel (1857–1943) – Scottish suffragist and tax resister, member of the Scottish Women’s Liberal Federation and the Edinburgh Suffrage Society
- Jessie Stephen (1893–1979) – British working class suffragette and trade union activist
- Flora Stevenson (1839–1905) – Scottish social reformer and suffragist, with interest in education for poor or neglected children
- Louisa Stevenson (1835–1908) – Scottish suffragist and campaigner for women's university education and effective, well-organised nursing, co-founder of Edinburgh’s Queen Margaret University
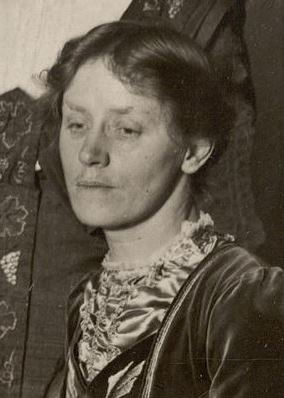
- Helena Swanwick
  Charlotte Carmichael Stopes (1840–1929) – British scholar, author, and campaigner for women's rights whose book British Freewomen: Their Historical Privilege (1894) influenced the suffrage movement
- Lucy Deane Streatfeild (1865–1950) – British civil servant, social worker, one of the first female factory inspectors, member of the NUWSS
- Emily Sturge (1847–1892) – British suffragist and women's education activist, secretary of the West of England branch of the NUWSS
- Ann Swaine (born in or before 1821–1883) – British writer, suffragist and advocate for women's higher education
- Annie S. Swan (1859–1943) – Scottish journalist, novelist and suffragette, arrested during a window smashing raid in London, later a founder-member and vice-president of the Scottish National Party
- Helena Swanwick (1864–1939) – British feminist, pacifist and suffragist, member of the NUWSS, WSPU and WILPF

=== T ===
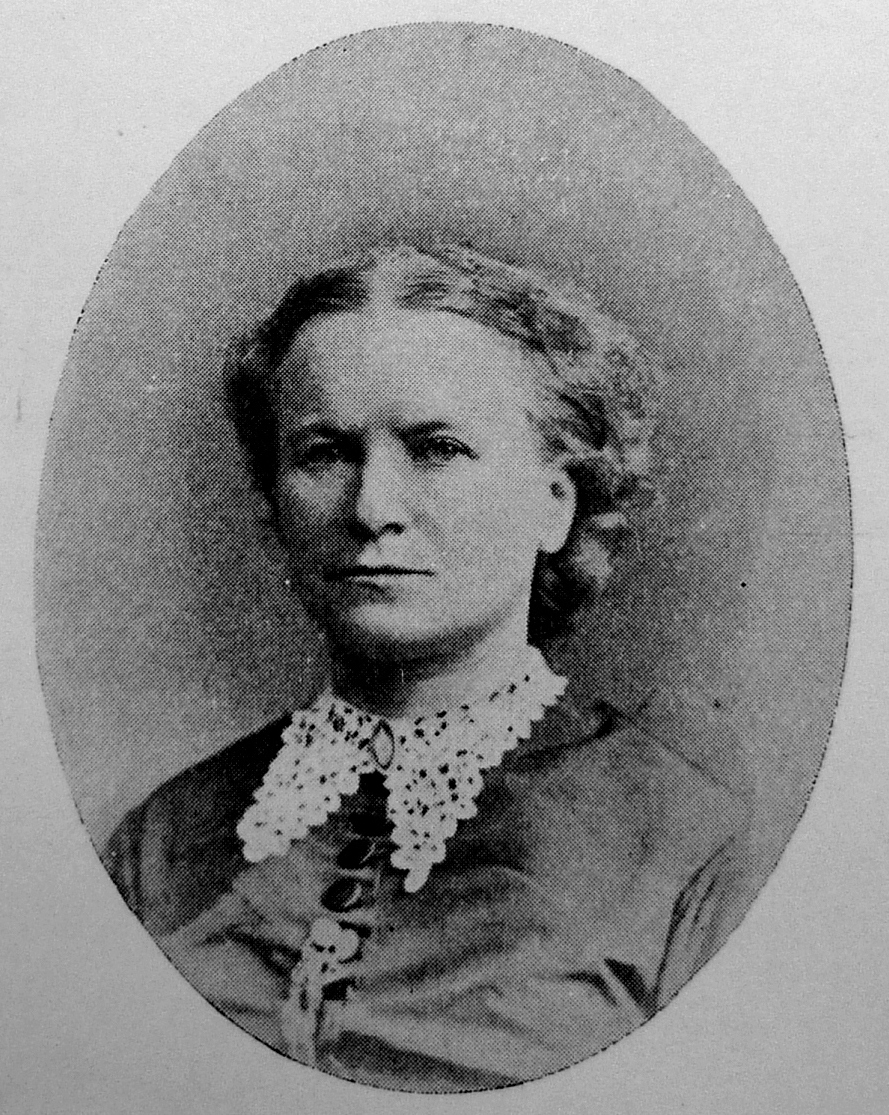
- Jane Taylour
  Jane Taylour (1827–1905) – Scottish suffragist and women's movement campaigner
- Janie Terrero (1858–1944) – British suffragette, member of the WSPU, awarded the Hunger Strike Medal
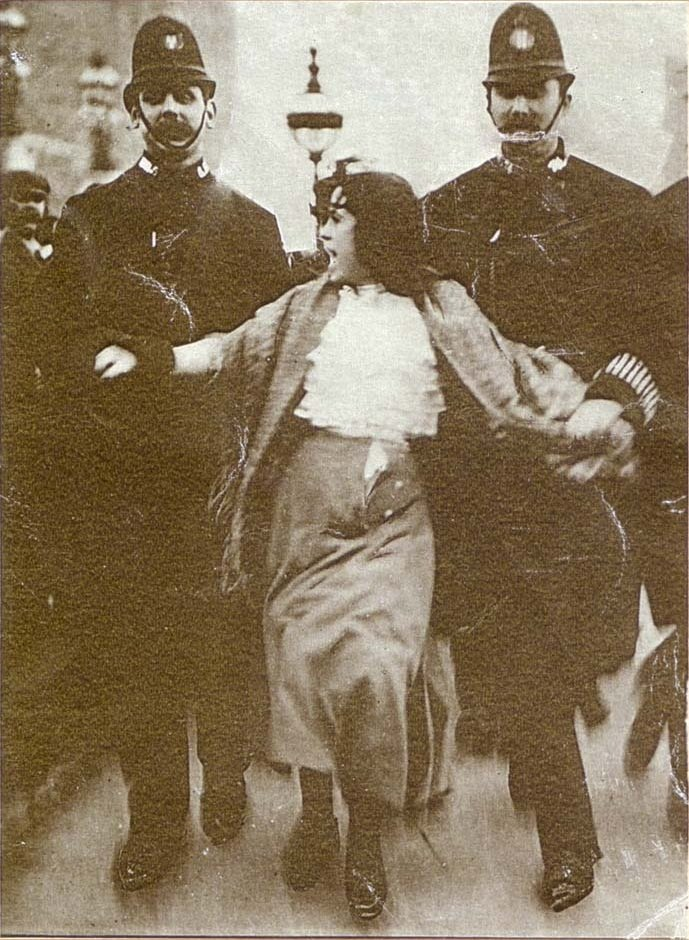
- Dora Thewlis being arrested in 1907
  Dora Thewlis (1890–1976) – British suffragette, member of the WSPU
- Mary Gladys Thoday (1884–1943) – Welsh botanist, suffragist and peace activist in Britain and South Africa
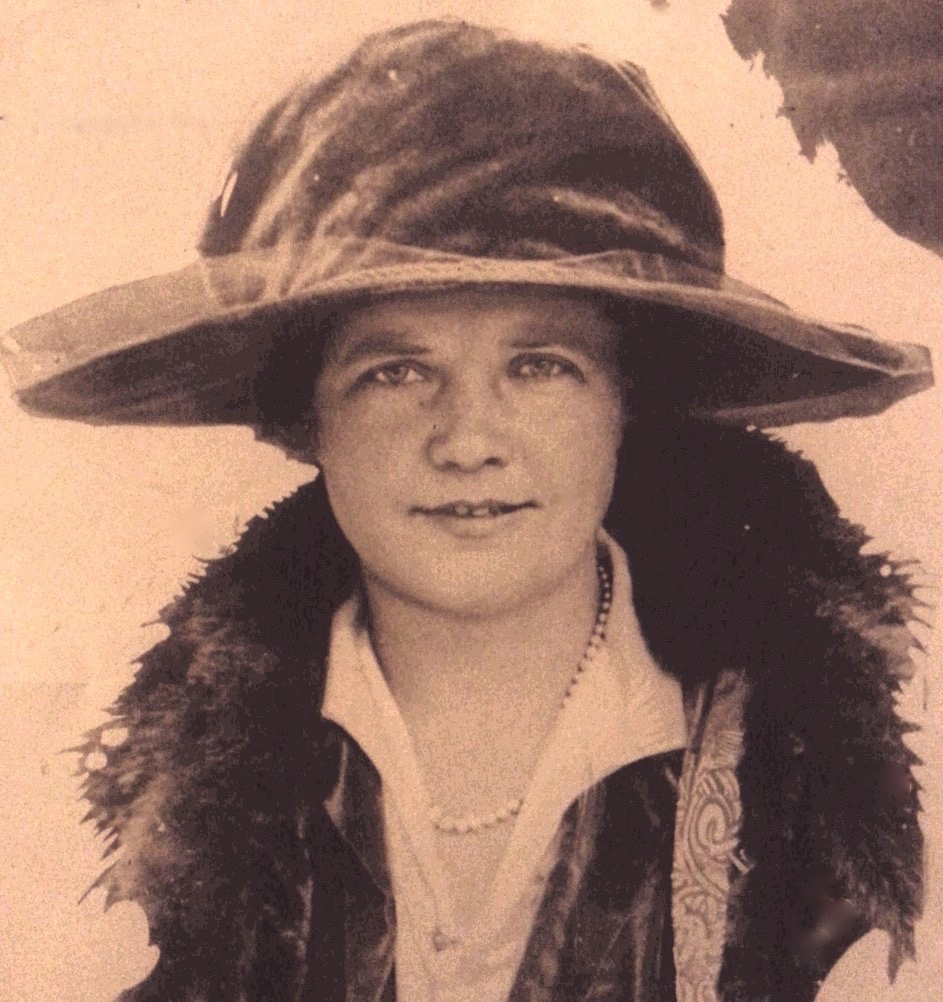
- Margaret Haig Thomas, 2nd Viscountess Rhondda
  Margaret Haig Thomas, 2nd Viscountess Rhondda (1883–1955) – Welsh peeress, suffragette, WSPU member, journalist, businesswoman, founder of the periodical Time and Tide
- Muriel Thompson (1875–1939) – Scottish World War I ambulance driver, racing driver and suffragist, member of the WSPU
- Agnes Thomson (born 1846) – Scottish suffragette, member of Edinburgh WSPU, missionary in India
- Elizabeth Thomson (born 1848) – Scottish suffragette, member of Edinburgh WSPU, hunger striker, missionary in India
- Louisa Thomson-Price (1864–1926) – British suffragist, cartoonist and businesswoman, drew cartoons for the WFL
- Violet Tillard (1874–1922) – British suffragette, nurse, pacifist, supporter of wartime conscientious objectors and relief worker, participant in the "Grille Incident"
- Isabella Tod (1836–1896) – Scottish suffragist, women's rights campaigner in the north of Ireland, helped women secure the municipal franchise in Belfast
- Aethel Tollemache (c. 1875–1955) – suffragette, member of the Bath WSPU branch, went on hunger strike in Holloway Prison
- Catherine Tolson (1890–1924) – English nurse and suffragette, member of the WSPU
- Helen Tolson (1888–1955) – English suffragette, member of the WSPU, sister of Catherine Tolson
- Mabel Tuke (1871–1962) – English suffragette, honorary secretary of the WSPU
- Florence Tunks (1891–1985) – suffragette, member of the WSPU who engaged in a campaign of arson in Suffolk
- Julia Turner (1863–1946) – British psychoanalyst and suffragette
- Minnie Turner (1866–1948) – English suffragette, ran a guest house in Brighton, member of the NUWSS, the WTRL and the WSPU, honorary secretary of the Women's Liberal Association in Brighton, awarded the hunger strike medal
- Mary Fraser Tytler (1849–1938) – British artist and suffragist, president of the Godalming and District National Union of Women's Suffrage Society (a local branch of the NUWSS)

=== V ===
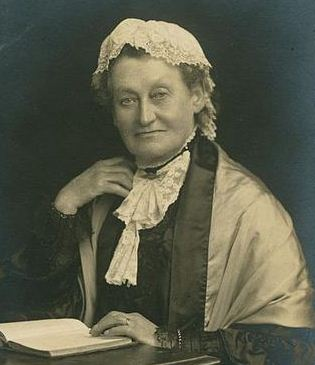
Alice Vickery

- Julia Varley (1871–1952) – English trade unionist and suffragette
- Alice Vickery (1844–1929) – English doctor, the first British woman to qualify as a chemist and pharmacist and delegate to the Congress of the International Women’s Suffrage Alliance in Amsterdam in 1908

=== W ===
- Melvina Walker (born 1874) – British suffragette and working class activist, member of the WSPU, the East London Federation of Suffragettes and the Communist Party (British Section of the Third International)
- Marion Wallace Dunlop (1864–1942) – Scottish artist, illustrator, children's writer and suffragette, member of the WSPU, went on hunger strike after being arrested for militancy
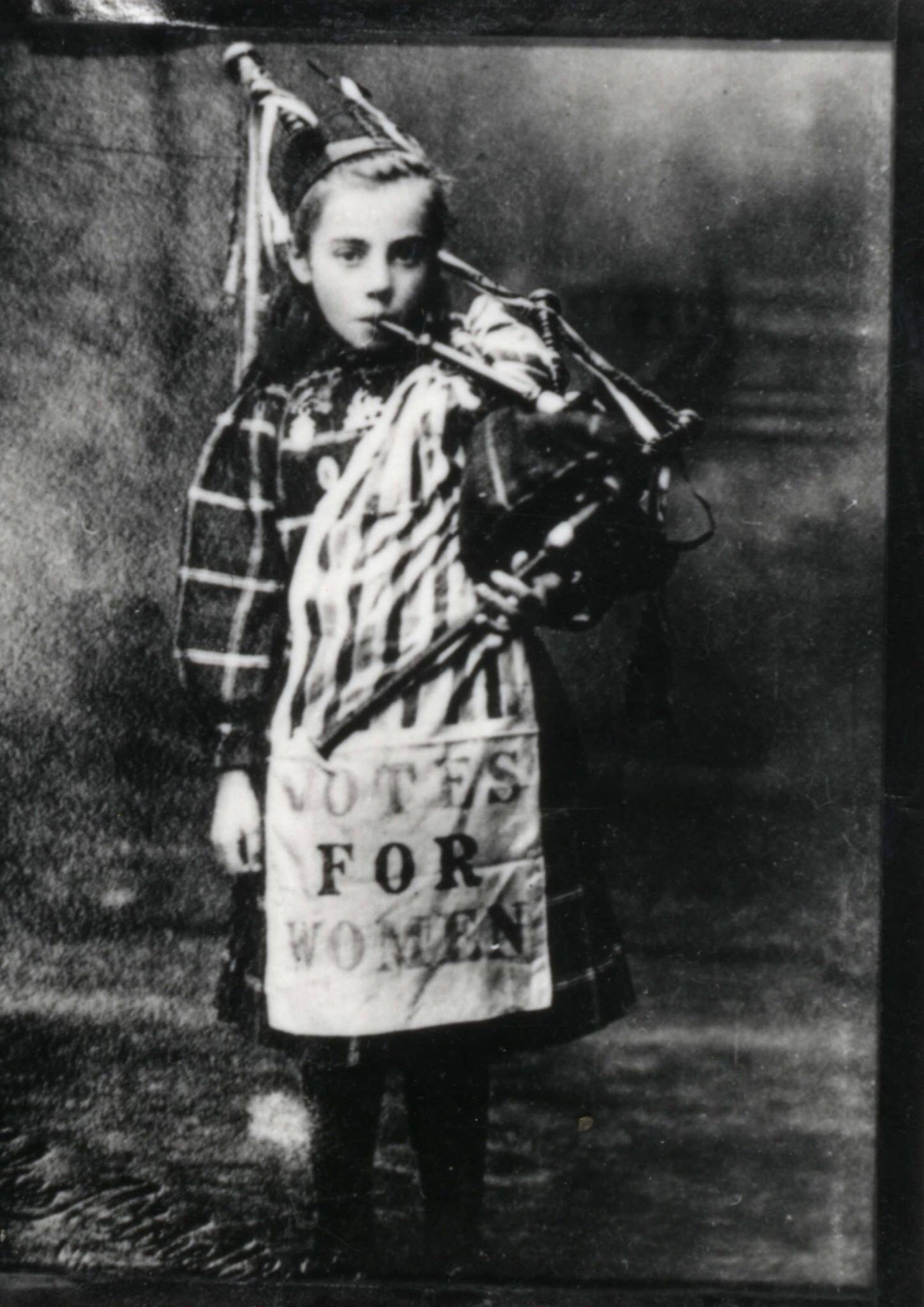
  Bessie Watson
- Olive Grace Walton (1886–1937) – British suffragette, was arrested three times, imprisoned twice, and force-fed in Aylesbury Prison after a hunger strike, member of the WSPU
- Mary Ward (1851–1933) – Irish-born suffragist, lecturer and writer in Cambridge, honorary secretary for the Cambridge branch of the NUWSS, member of the National Union of Societies for Equal Citizenship and member of The Ladies Dining Society, her 1908 play Man and Woman became a popular fundraiser with local suffrage societies
- Bessie Watson (1900–1992) – Scottish child suffragette and piper
- Edith Watson (1888–1966) – English suffragist, police officer and campaigner against Female Genital Mutilation, member of the WFL
- Mona Chalmers Watson (1872–1936) – British physician and head of the Women's Army Auxiliary Corps, served as a doctor for suffragette prisoners
- Helen Kirkpatrick Watts (1881–1972) – English suffragette, member of the WSPU, awarded the Hunger Strike Medal
- Harriet Shaw Weaver (1876–1961) – English political activist, magazine editor and suffragist, member of the WSPU
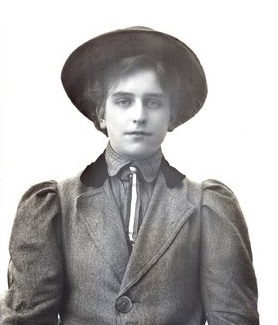
- Vera Wentworth in 1909
  Beatrice Webb (1858–1943) – English sociologist, economist, socialist, labour historian, social reformer, co-founder of the New Statesman with Henry Devenish Harben
- Lucia Foster Welch – English politician, member of the WSPU
- Bettina Borrmann Wells (born 1874) – Bavarian-born English suffragette who toured the United States as an organizer and lecturer
- Vera Wentworth (1890–1957) – British suffragette, nurse and playwright. Member of the WSPU, was sent to Holloway Prison and was force fed. She door stepped and then assaulted the Prime Minister twice. She wrote Three Months in Holloway
- Rebecca West (1892–1983) – British author, journalist, literary critic, travel writer, wrote articles supporting women's suffrage in the Freewoman feminist weekly review
- Olive Wharry (1886–1947) – English suffragette, artist and arsonist; imprisoned with Lilian Lenton for burning down the tea pavilion at Kew Gardens, member of the Church League for Women's Suffrage and the WSPU, went on hunger strike in prison
- Monica Whately (1889–1960) – British suffragist and political activist
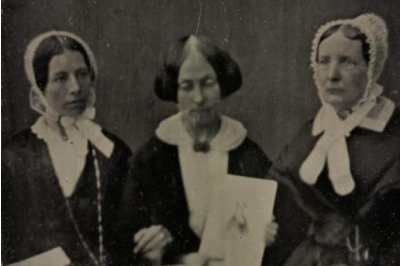
  Early suffragists Eliza Wigham, Mary Estlin and Jane Wigham
- Alice Wheeldon (1866–1919) – British anti-war campaigner and suffragist
- Edith Grey Wheelwright (1868–1949) – English botanist, writer and suffragist, secretary of the Bath branch of the NUWSS
- Charlotte Price White (1873–1932) – Welsh suffragist and politician, leader of the Bangor branch of the NUWSS
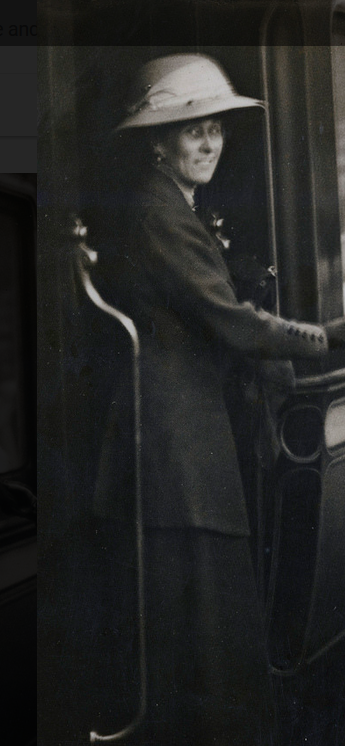
  Barbara Wylie
- Eliza Wigham (1820–1899) – Scottish suffragist and abolitionist, founder member of the Edinburgh National Society for Women's Suffrage
- Jane Wigham (1801–1888) – Scottish suffragist and abolitionist, founded the Glasgow Anti-Slavery Society and member of the Edinburgh chapter of the National Society of Women's Suffrage
- Henria Leech Williams (1867–1911) British suffragette and member of the WSPU, died two months after the Black Friday demonstration
- Ellen Wilkinson (1891–1947) – British suffragist, politician and member of parliament, served as minister of education, member of the Manchester Society for Women's Suffrage
- Gertrude Wilkinson (1851–1929) – British suffragette, member of the WSPU, Literature Secretary for the WFL, imprisoned in Winson Green Prison and went on hunger strike
- Elizabeth Wilks (1861–1956) – English suffragist and tax resister
- Helen Mary Wilson (1864–1951) – British physician and social campaigner, honorary secretary then president of the Sheffield Women's Suffrage Society
- Laura Annie Willson (1877–1942) – English engineer and suffragette, secretary of the Halifax branch of the WSPU
- Jeannette Wilkinson (1841–1886) – British suffragist and trade unionist
- Hannah Winbolt (1851–1928) – English suffragist
- Laetitia Withall (1881–1963) – Australian-British poet, author and suffragette, member of the WSPU
- Mary Wollstonecraft (1759–1797) – English writer and philosopher
- Celia Wray (1872–1954) – English suffragette and architect
- I. A. R. Wylie (1885–1959) – Australian-British writer, suffragette in UK, working on The Suffragette
- Barbara Wylie (1861–1954) – organiser of the Glasgow branch of the WSPU, went on a speaking tour of Canada and gave a speech that inspired the slogan "deeds not words"

=== Y ===
- Lucy Yates (1863–1935) – British writer and suffragist, member of the WSPU and the WFL

=== Z ===
- Israel Zangwill (1864–1926) – English writer, member of the Men's League for Women's Suffrage
- Alice Zimmern (1855–1939) – English teacher, writer and suffragist, leading member of the Barnsley Women's Suffrage Society

== See also ==
- Balloon Raid
- List of suffragists and suffragettes
- List of women's suffrage organizations
- List of women's suffrage publications
- Swimming suffragists
- Timeline of women's suffrage
- Women's suffrage in the United Kingdom
- Young Hot Bloods
