= Agnes Lake =

British suffragette (1887–1972)

- Born: c. 1887; Harlow, Essex, England
- Died: c. 1972; Wandsworth, London, England
- Employer: Women's Social and Political Union (WSPU)’s newspaper The Suffragette
- Children: 1

Agnes Caroline Lake (1887–1972) was a British suffragette who was the business manager of the Women's Social and Political Union (WSPU)’s newspaper The Suffragette.

== Life ==
Lake was born in 1887 in Harlow, Essex. She married Dr. William Henry Whatmough in 1910. They had one daughter, who was born in the United States of America.

Lake was employed as the business manager of the Women's Social and Political Union (WSPU)’s newspaper The Suffragette. She liaised with Emmeline and Christabel Pankhurst about improving the publications content and layout.

On 30 April 1913, Lake was arrested alongside Beatrice Sanders, Rachel Barrett, Harriet Kerr and Flora Drummond when police raided the WSPU headquarters. She was charged with conspiracy under the Malicious Damage to Property Act and was sentenced to 21 months imprisonment. In June 1913, she was transferred to Warwick Goal in Warwickshire, where she went on hunger strike and was force fed. She was so unwell by October 1913 that she was moved into a nursing home in Royal Leamington Spa under the "Cat and Mouse Act." It is likely that she was awarded the Hunger Strike Medal. After absconding from the nursing home with the help of a local suffragette called Mrs Bell, she was rearrested outside her home in Leytonstone, London, during December 1913.

Lake was later dismissed from her role with the WSPU's newspaper, which Christabel Pankhurst said was "purely a business matter".

She died in 1972 in Wandsworth, London, aged 84.
