= Rachel Barrett =

Welsh suffragette and newspaper editor 1874–1953

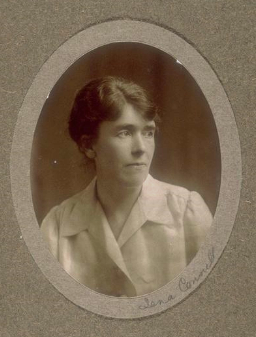
- Rachel Barrett
- Born: 12 November 1874; Carmarthen, Carmarthenshire, Wales
- Died: 26 August 1953 (aged 78); Faygate, Sussex, England
- Education: University College of Wales, Aberystwyth
- Occupations: teacher political organiser editor
- Organization(s): Women's Social and Political Union (1906–1917/1918); Women's Institute (1934–1948)

Rachel Barrett (12 November 1874 – 26 August 1953) was a Welsh suffragette and newspaper editor born in Carmarthen. Educated at the University College of Wales in Aberystwyth she became a science teacher, but quit her job in 1906 on hearing Nellie Martel speak of women's suffrage, joined the Women's Social and Political Union (WSPU) and moved to London. In 1907, she became a WSPU organiser, and after Christabel Pankhurst fled to Paris, Barrett became joint organiser of the national WSPU campaign. In 1912, despite no journalistic background, she took charge of the new newspaper The Suffragette. Barrett was arrested on occasions for activities linked to the suffrage movement and, in 1913–1914, spent some time incognito to avoid re-arrest.

== Early life ==
Barrett was born in Carmarthen on 12 November 1874 to Rees Barrett, a land and road surveyor, and his second wife Anne Jones, both Welsh-speakers. She grew up in the town of Llandeilo with her elder brother Rees and a younger sister, Janette. By the 1881 census, her mother Anne was the lone adult living at their address on Alan Road, her father having died in 1878. Barrett was educated at Stratford Abbey School, a boarding school in Stroud, along with her sister, and won a scholarship to the University College of Wales, Aberystwyth. She graduated in 1904 with an external London BSc degree in mathematics and science. After graduating she became a science teacher and taught in Llangefni, Carmarthen and Penarth.

== Life as a suffragette ==
=== Early activism with the WSPU ===
Towards the end of 1906 Barrett attended a suffrage rally in Cardiff and was inspired by a speech from Nellie Martel to join the Women's Social and Political Union (WSPU) at the end of the meeting. She felt "that they were doing the right and only thing" and thought that she herself "had always been a suffragist." By the following year Barrett was active as a WSPU activist and helped organise Adela Pankhurst's meetings in Cardiff and Barry that year, sharing the stage with her as one of the speakers. Barrett spoke on behalf of the WSPU at many meetings, often in Welsh, which conflicted with her role as a schoolteacher as her headmistress disapproved of the publicity, especially after news of Barrett being flour-bombed with Adela Pankhurst at a rally in Cardiff Docks made the local papers.

In July 1907, Barrett resigned as a teacher and enrolled at the London School of Economics (LSE), near the WSPU headquarters at Clement's Inn, intending to study economics and sociology and to work towards her DSc. That August she was heavily active for the WSPU, campaigning at the Bury St Edmunds by-election with Gladice Keevil, Nellie Martel, Emmeline Pankhurst, Aeta Lamb and Elsa Gye. She influenced the American student Alice Paul, and both sold copies of Votes for Women.

Barrett was also active with Adela Pankhurst at Bradford. With her campaign activities over Barrett was free to attend the LSE, which proved useful for attending WSPU activities in nearby Clement's Inn. Over the Christmas period Barrett was again busy campaigning for the WSPU, with Pankhurst, Martel, Lamb, and Nellie Crocker at the "rough and boisterous" staunchly Liberal Mid-Devon seat at Newton Abbott, and next time in the lead up to the Ashburton by-election.

Shortly afterwards Barrett was asked by Christabel Pankhurst to become a full-time organiser of the WSPU, an offer which would see her leave her course at the LSE. Barrett regretted giving up her studies but accepted the position stating, "It was a definite call and I obeyed."

Barrett spent 1908 first organising a campaign in Nottingham and then working on the by-elections in both Dewsbury and Dundee where she supported Scottish suffragette campaigners Helen Fraser, Elsa Gye and Mary Gawthorpe. In June of that year she was the chair of one of the platforms at the Hyde Park rally, but the work took its toll on her health and shortly afterwards she was forced to temporarily step down from her position to recuperate, which included a period of time at a sanatorium. After recovering she moved closer to home, volunteering for Annie Kenney in Bristol. She soon agreed to resume her role as a paid organiser for he WSPU and was sent to Newport in south-east Wales to continue her duties.

In 1910, Barrett was chosen to lead a group of women to talk to the Chancellor of the Exchequer, David Lloyd George, regarding the Liberal Party's role in supporting the first Conciliation Bill. The meeting lasted two and a half hours, and by its end she was convinced that Lloyd George had been insincere over his support for equal voting rights and believed him to be against women's suffrage. By the end of the year her post was changed to organising all WSPU activities in Wales and she was relocated to the country's headquarters in Cardiff. According to Ryland Wallace, writing in 2009, "No individual worked harder than Rachel Barrett to promote the campaign in Wales."

=== Editor of The Suffragette ===
"an exceptionally clever and highly educated woman, she was a devoted worker and had tremendous admiration for Christabel."

— Annie Kenney's recollection of Barrett, Memories of a Militant (1924)

In 1912, Barrett was selected by Kenney (who saw her as a 'highly-educated woman, a devoted worker' to help run the WPSU national campaign), following the raid by police on Clement's Inn and Christabel Pankhurst's subsequent flight to Paris. Barrett moved back to London and within a few months she was given the role of assistant editor of the WSPU newspaper, The Suffragette, on its launch in October 1912. Writing in her autobiography Barrett described becoming an editor as "an appalling task as I knew nothing whatever of journalism". By taking on the job she also took on the risks connected with the increasingly militant WSPU. She travelled under cover to Paris to meet with Christabel Pankhurst, and when speaking to her on the phone she recalled how she "could always hear the click of Scotland Yard listening in."

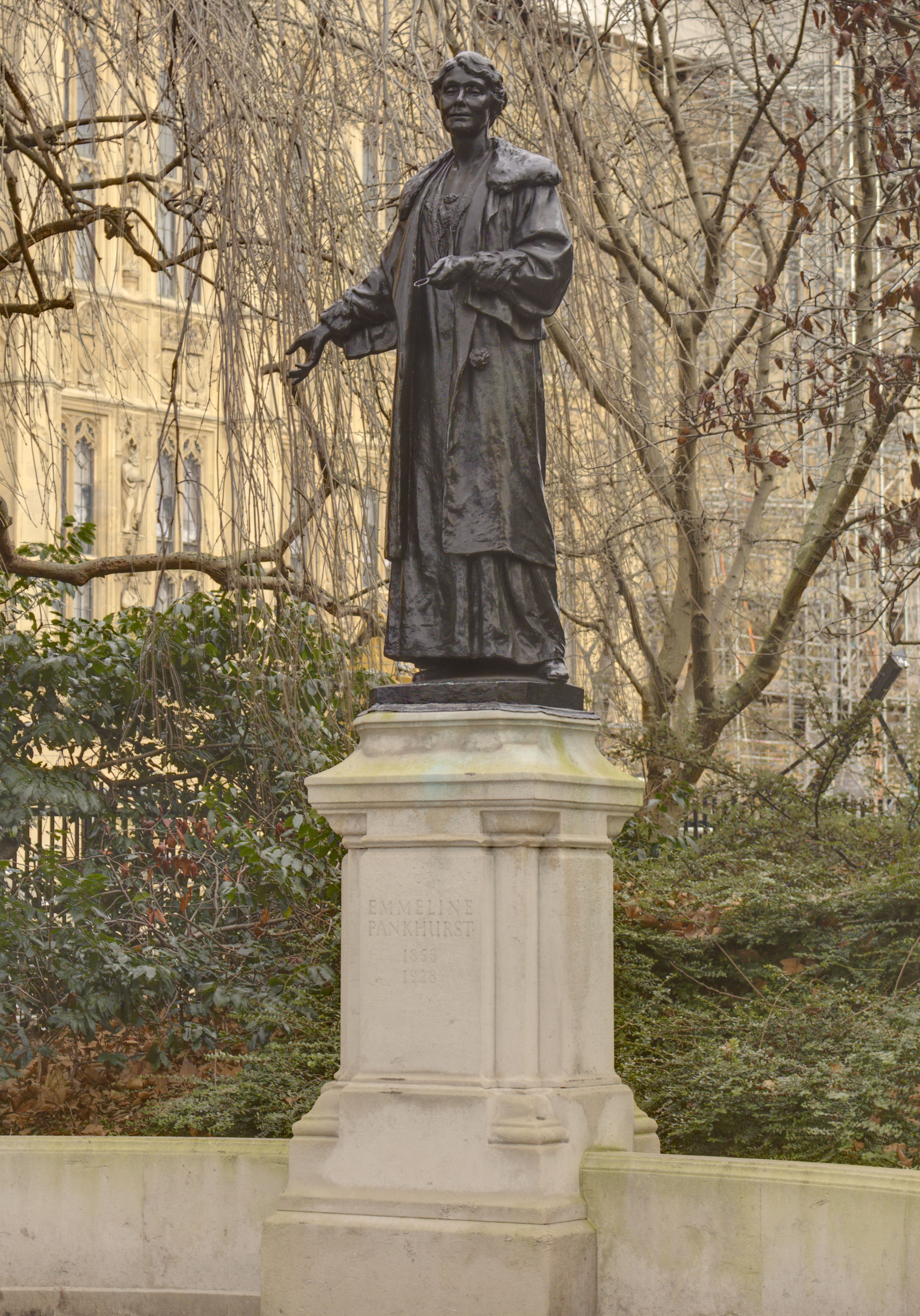
The statue of Emmeline Pankhurst in Westminster. Barrett played a key role in raising the funds to erect this memorial

Over the next two years, Barrett was a key figure in keeping the newspaper in print despite the Home Secretary's efforts to suppress it. In April 1913, the offices of The Suffragette were raided by the police and Barrett, Beatrice Sanders, Agnes Lake, Harriet Kerr and Flora Drummond were arrested on charges of conspiring to damage property. Barrett was sentenced to nine months' imprisonment at Holloway. She immediately went on hunger strike, was transferred to Canterbury Prison, and after five days she was released under the "Cat and Mouse Act". She moved into "Mouse Castle", 2 Campden Hill Square, home of the Brackenbury family who were sympathetic suffragists. After three weeks at the house, Barrett emerged and was rearrested. She went back on hunger strike and after four days was again released to "Mouse Castle". This time, she was smuggled out of the house in disguise to allow her to speak at meetings, before being rearrested for a second time and was looked after by her friend I. A. R. Wylie at St John's Wood, known as the "Mouse Hole" and for the third time, Barrett was released after a hunger strike, but this time, she successfully eluded the authorities and fled to a nursing home in Edinburgh where she remained until December 1913. On leaving Scotland, she returned in secret to London; she hid at Lincoln's Inn House where she lived in a bed-sitting room there, only getting air on the roof.

Barrett continued to edit The Suffragette, but she travelled to Paris to discuss the future of the newspaper with Christabel Pankhurst after its offices were raided in May 1914. The result of their meeting was the relocation of The Suffragette to Edinburgh where the printers were at less risk of arrest. Barrett moved to Edinburgh with Ida Wylie and assumed the pseudonym "Miss Ashworth". Barrett continued to publish the paper until its final edition on the week after the First World War was declared. During the war, Barrett was a vocal supporter of British military action, as were the majority of the suffragette movement. She was a contributor to the WSPU 'Victory Fund' which was launched in 1916 to sponsor campaigns against "a compromise peace" and industrial strikes.

After the passing of the Representation of the People Act 1918, in which some women within the United Kingdom were first given the right to vote, Barrett busied herself in continuing the fight for full emancipation. When full voting rights were won in 1928, she helped raise funds for commemorations and was an important figure in raising the money needed to erect a statue of Emmeline Pankhurst in Victoria Tower Gardens, near the Palace of Westminster in London. Barrett understood the international connections of suffrage and contacted important Canadian and American campaigners for financial support. In Barrett's obituary in the Women's Bulletin, it read that the raising of the statue "...stands as a permanent memorial to Rachel's organising ability." In 1929, Barrett was appointed secretary of the Equal Political Rights Campaign Committee, an organisation that sought equality between men and women in all political spheres.

== Later life ==
In her later life, Barrett joined the Suffragette Fellowship with Edith How-Martyn and was particularly close to Kitty Marshall who lived near by. She attempted to publish a memoir of Marshall in the late 1940s, but it was turned down for publication. Barrett moved to Sible Hedingham in Essex in the early 1930s and joined the Sible Hedingham Women's Institute in 1934, remaining a member until 1948. There she lived at Lamb Cottage.

== Relationship with I. A. R. Wylie ==
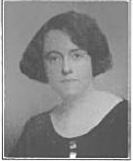
I. A. R. Wylie in 1921, during her time with Barrett

During her time editing The Suffragette, Barrett struck up a lesbian relationship with the female Australian author I. A. R. Wylie, who contributed to the paper in 1913. In 1919, Barrett and Wylie travelled to the United States, where they bought a car and spent over a year travelling round the country. They stayed in New York and San Francisco and were recorded in the 1920 census as living in Carmel-by-the-Sea in California, where Wylie was classed as the head of the household and Barrett as her friend.

The two women remained close for some time and, in 1928, were supporters of their close friends Una Troubridge and Radclyffe Hall during the trial of The Well of Loneliness. When Barrett died, she left the residue of her estate to Wylie.

== Death ==
Barrett died of a cerebral haemorrhage on 26 August 1953 at the Carylls Nursing Home in Faygate, Sussex. She was 78 years old. She left Lamb Cottage to her niece Gwyneth Anderson, who lived there with her husband, the British poet, J. Redwood Anderson.

== Primary sources ==
- Cook, Kay; Evans, Neil (1991). "'The Petty Antics of the Bell-Ringing Boisterous Band'? The Women's Suffrage Movement in Wales, 1890–1918". In John, Angela V. (ed.). Our Mothers' Land, Chapters in Welsh Women's History 1830–1939. Cardiff: University of Wales Press. ISBN 0-7083-1129-6.
- Crawford, Elizabeth (2003). The Women's Suffrage Movement: A Reference Guide 1866–1928. Routledge. ISBN 9781135434021.
- John, Angela V. (1991). "Beyond Paternalism: The Ironmaster's Wife in the Industrial Community". In John, Angela V. (ed.). Our Mothers' Land, Chapters in Welsh Women's History 1830–1939. Cardiff: University of Wales Press. ISBN 0-7083-1129-6.
- Wallace, Ryland (2009). The Women's Suffrage Movement in Wales, 1866–1928. Cardiff: University of Wales Press. ISBN 978-0-708-32173-7.
