= Harriet Kerr =

British suffragette (1859–1940)

Harriet Roberta Kerr
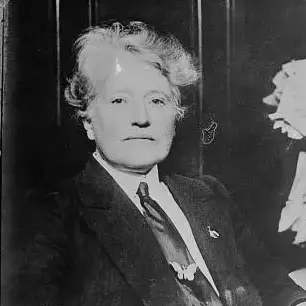
- Harriet Roberta Kerr in 1913
- Born: 1859; Wanstead, Essex, England
- Died: 1940 (aged 80–81); Hampshire, England
- Employer: The Suffragette newspaper
- Organisation: Women's Social and Political Union
- Father: Robert Kerr

Harriet Roberta Kerr (1859–1940) was a British suffragette and office manager of the Women's Social and Political Union (WSPU).

== Early life ==
Kerr was born in 1859 in Wanstead, Essex. Her father Robert Kerr was a professor of architecture at King's College London. She became interested in women's rights and suffrage because of her father's prejudice against women.

== Women's suffrage ==
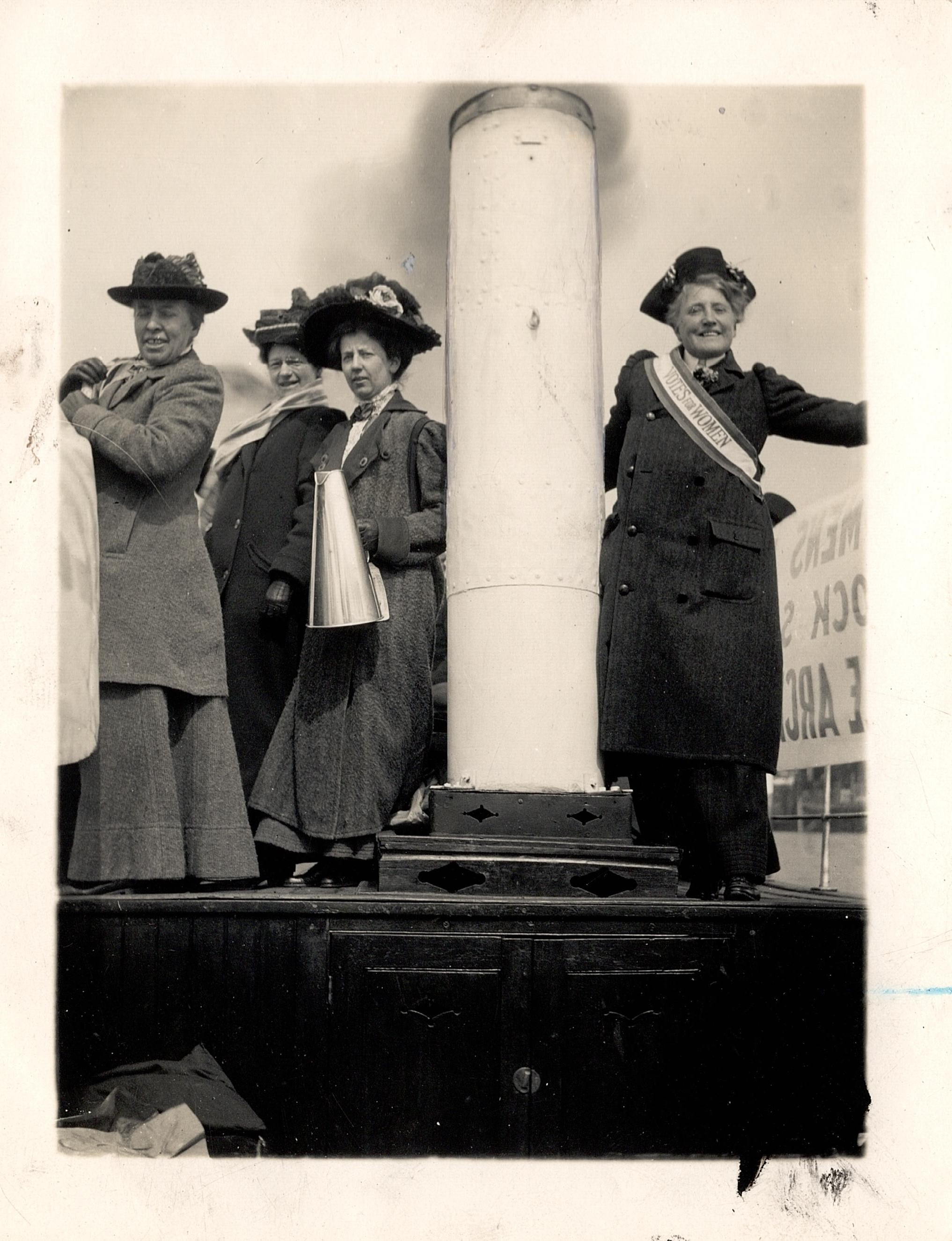
Kerr with fellow suffragettes Hilda Dallas, Maud Joachim and one other, at the Oxford and Cambridge Boat Race

Kerr ran a successful secretarial agency in London, but she gave up her business to dedicate herself to working for the campaign for women's enfranchisement. In 1906, she was appointed as the paid office manager of the national headquarters of the WSPU in Clement's Inn, London, on the agreement that her work would be solely administrative. She oversaw volunteers and mentored new recruits such as Charlotte Marsh.

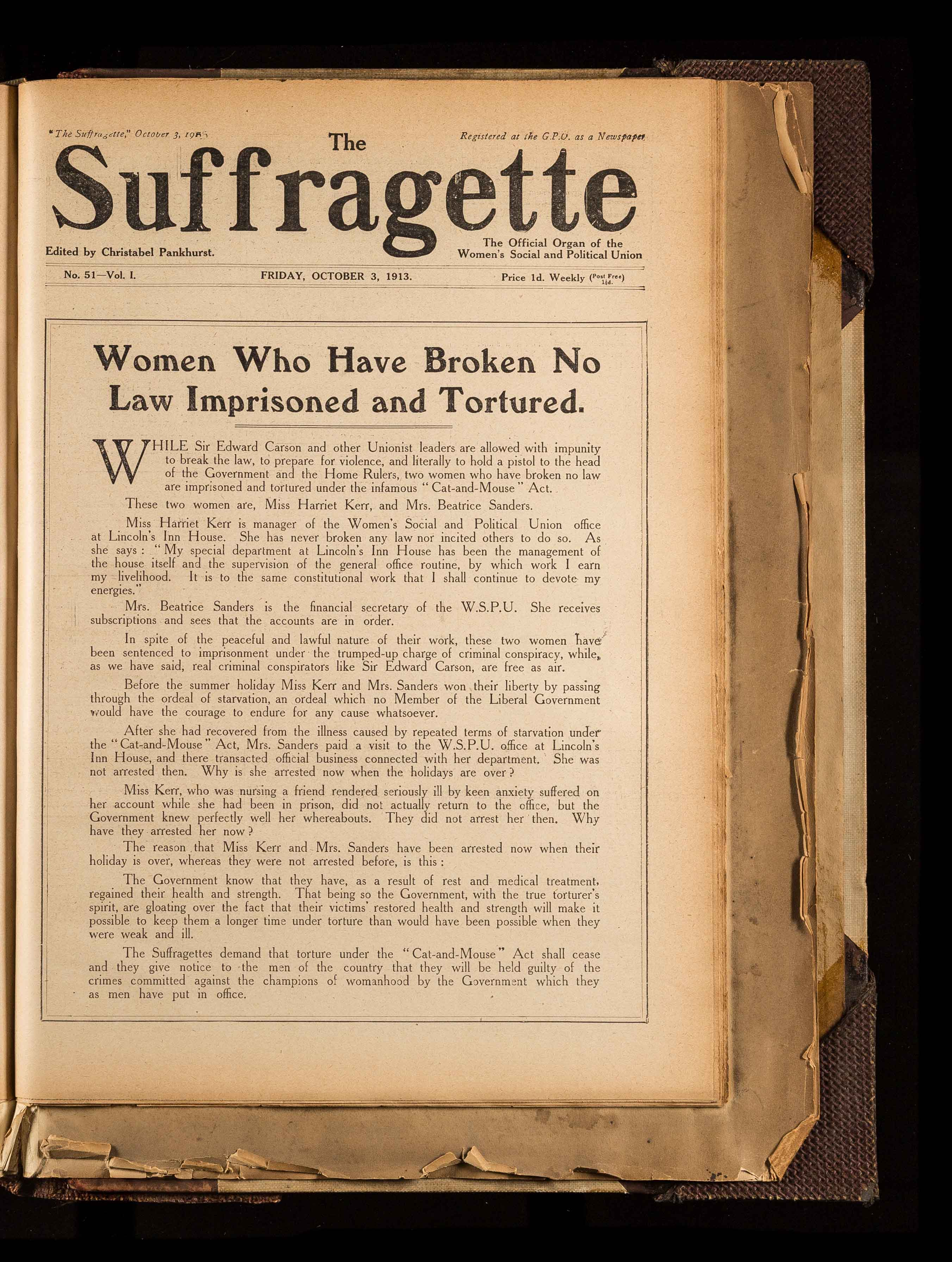
Front page of The Suffragette, 3 October 1913, reporting the arrests of Kerr and Sanders

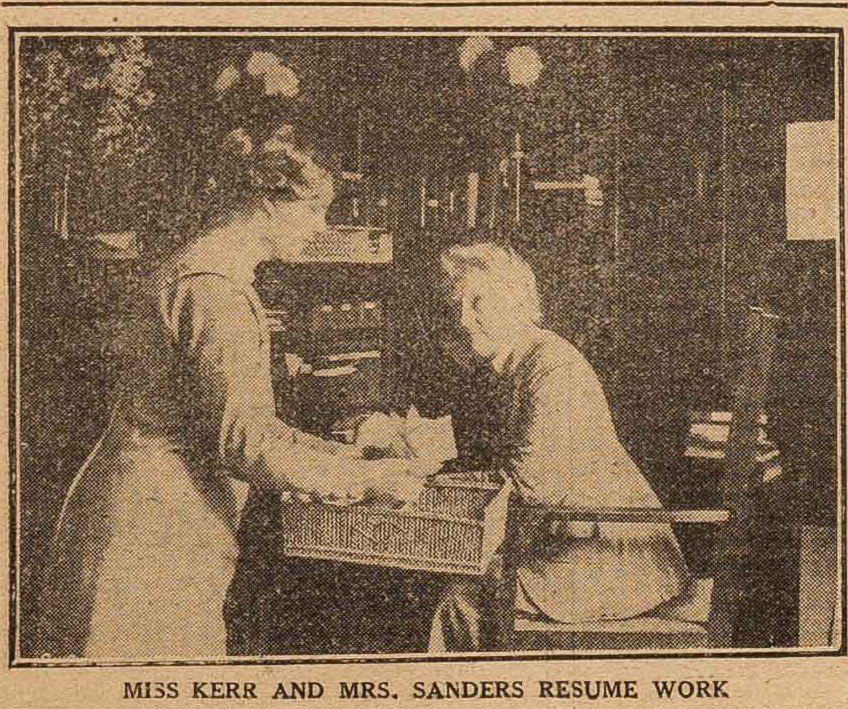
Kerr and Beatrice Sanders at the offices of the Women's Social and Political Union (WSPU), from The Suffragette, 3 October 1913

On 30 April 1913, Kerr was arrested alongside Beatrice Sanders, Rachel Barrett, Agnes Lake (business manager of The Suffragette newspaper) and Flora Drummond when police raided the WSPU offices. She was sentenced to 12 months imprisonment with hard labour for conspiracy to do wilful damage to property, even though she had not yet marched in a deputation or participated in any militant action. She went on hunger strike and was temporarily released in June 1913 under the "Cat and Mouse Act". It is likely that she was awarded the Hunger Strike Medal. She stayed at Hook Cottage in Billingshurst, Sussex, to recuperate, then in October 1913 was rearrested, once again at the WSPU offices. During the rearrest of Kerr and Sanders, Annie Ford, Emma Birchell and Alice Virtue tried to stop the police from taking them and were also arrested. They were charged with obstructing the police and fined 40 shillings each. After serving the rest of her sentence, Kerr was sentenced to twelve months under police supervision. Due to the impact on her physical health, Kerr retired from the suffrage campaign.

== Later life ==
When Emmeline Pankhurst died on 14 June 1928, Kerr was one of her pallbearers, alongside other former suffragettes Georgiana Brackenbury, Marie Brackenbury, Marion Wallace Dunlop, Mildred Mansel, Kitty Marshall, Rosamund Massy, Marie Naylor, Ada Wright and Barbara Wylie.

Kerr died in 1940 in Hampshire.
