= Violet Aitken =

British suffragette

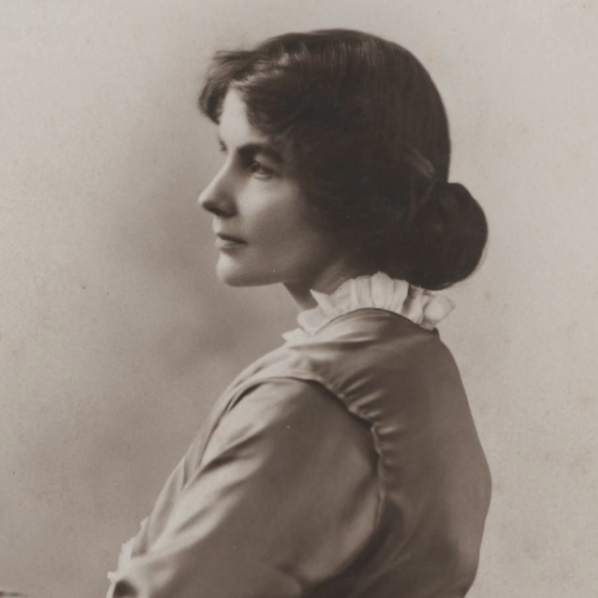
- Born: Marion Violet Aitken; 21 January 1886; Bedfordshire, England, United Kingdom of Great Britain and Ireland
- Died: November 1987 (aged 101); Hertfordshire, England, UK
- Known for: Suffragette
- Movement: Women's Social and Political Union (WSPU)

Violet Aitken (21 January 1886 – November 1987) was a British suffragette who was awarded a Hunger Strike Medal for valour. She edited The Suffragette.

== Life ==
Marion Violet Aitken was born and raised in Bedfordshire, she was the daughter of William Aitken, who became Canon of Norwich Cathedral. She had a sister, Rose, who took up theosophy.

She became a suffragette and editor of The Suffragette and was imprisoned and force-fed. Latterly, she lived in Hertfordshire, where she died in 1987, aged 101.

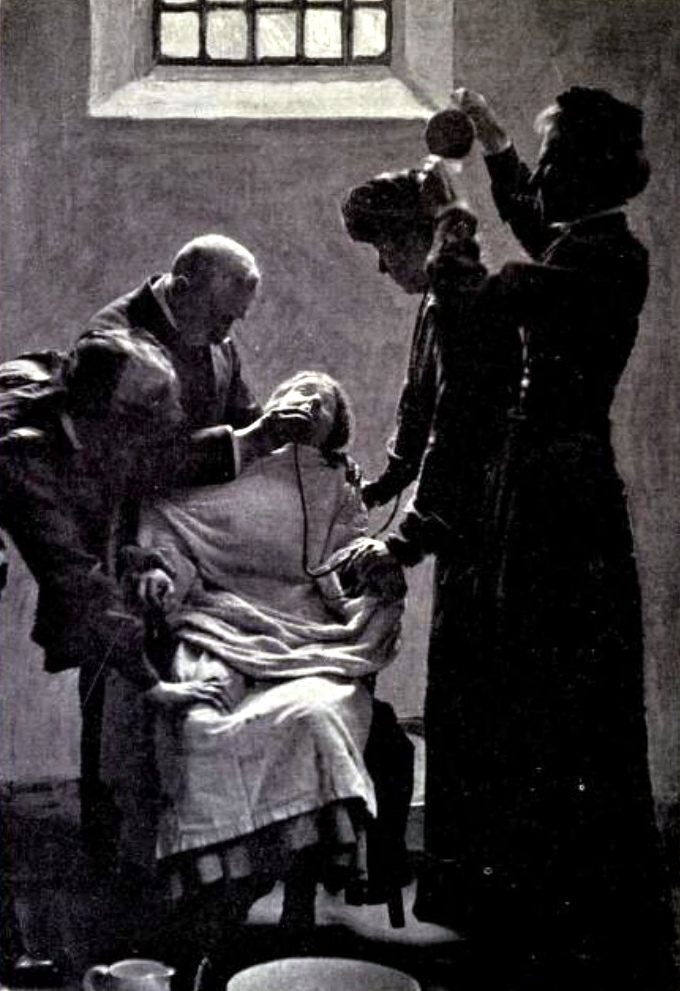
Force-feeding (suffragettes)

== Political activism ==
Aitken became active in the women's suffrage movement in the Women's Social and Political Union (WSPU) of the Pankhursts. In November 1911, she held the bridle of a police horse during a WSPU protest, and was arrested and sent to Holloway prison.

In March 1912, she and Clara Giveen were arrested for damaging £100 of windows at Jay's clothing shop in London's Regent Street. In June 1912, she was released from Winson Green, having been transferred due to prison overcrowding, but near the end of a four-month prison sentence, during which she was force-fed after going on hunger strike. Aitken was awarded a Hunger Strike Medal 'for valour' by WSPU.

Her father and mother were pained by her involvement in violent protests, as he wrote in his diary, although he later recognised women's calls for being allowed to vote were 'after all only an act of justice'.

== Journalism ==
Aitken had considered leaving her editorial job at The Suffragette and pursuing a literary career, but rescinded that decision after the funeral of Emily Davison, who had died after throwing herself onto the racetrack.

== Records and images ==
Aitken's autograph was within a collection auctioned in 2012.

Her prison record is now in the National Archives.
