= Norah Elam =

British suffragette and fascist (1878–1961)

- Born: 5 March 1878; Blackrock, Dublin, Ireland, United Kingdom of Great Britain and Ireland
- Died: 2 March 1961 (aged 82); London, England, United Kingdom
- Occupation: Suffragette

Norah Elam, also known as Norah Dacre Fox (née Norah Doherty, 5 March 1878 – 2 March 1961), was an Irish-born militant suffragette, anti-vivisectionist, feminist and fascist in the United Kingdom.

== Early life ==
Norah Doherty was born on 5 March 1878 at 13 Waltham Terrace in Blackrock, Dublin to John Doherty, a partner in a paper mill, and Charlotte Isabel Clarke. She moved to England with her family and by 1891 was living in London. Norah married Charles Richard Dacre Fox in 1909.

== Political activity ==
Norah Dacre Fox was a prominent member of the Women's Social and Political Union and, by 1913, served as general secretary. Dacre Fox was an effective propagandist, delivering rousing speeches at the WSPU weekly meetings and writing many of Christabel Pankhurst's speeches.

In May 1914 Flora Drummond and Norah Dacre Fox besieged the homes of Edward Carson and Lord Lansdowne, both prominent Ulster Unionist politicians who had been inciting militancy in Ulster against the Home Rule Bill then going through Parliament. Drummond and Dacre Fox had both been issued with summonses to appear before magistrates for 'making inciting speeches' and encouraging women to militancy. Their response to journalists who interviewed them was that they thought they should take refuge with Carson and Lansdowne who had also been making speeches and encouraging militancy in Ireland, but who appeared to be safe from interference from the authorities for doing so. Both women appeared before a magistrate, were sentenced to imprisonment and taken to Holloway Prison where they immediately commenced hunger and thirst strikes and endured force-feeding. From May to July 1914 she was imprisoned three times in Holloway for "acts of terrorism"; she received a WSPU Hunger Strike Medal with three bars.

In the 1918 United Kingdom general election she stood as an independent candidate in Richmond (Surrey); she received 20% of the votes but was not elected. The same year she campaigned for the internment of enemy aliens in collaboration with the British Empire Union and the National Party. Norah Elam stated in The Times that she was never a member of the Women's Freedom League (contrary to some reports).

Elam was a member of the London and Provincial Anti-Vivisection Society (LPAVS). During 1916 and 1917, Elam obtained work as supervisor of a typewriting pool at the Medical Research Council (MRC), gaining information she was to use in articles published under the auspices of the LPAVS during 1934 and 1935. In March 1921, Elam advertised in The Times and chaired a public meeting of LPAVS at the Aeolian Hall in London to discuss 'The Dog's Bill' (a bill to prohibit the vivisection of dogs) that was being debated in Parliament at that time. In 1932, the MRC had produced a paper called "Vitamins, A Survey of Present Knowledge". Elam's 1934 response was entitled "The Vitamin Survey, A Reply" and was a critical appraisal of that survey and its results. This was followed in 1935 by "The Medical Research Council, What it is and how it works" based on the same arguments about MRC research practices and remits as the first paper, but distilled and argued more cogently on a broader front. Elam's argument was that 'powerful vested interests' had managed to 'entrench' themselves behind 'State-aided research', and had managed to make themselves unaccountable. These papers were widely distributed and copies could be found in libraries throughout the UK.

By the 1930s, she had separated from her husband, and was living with Edward Descou Dudley Vallance Elam whose surname she generally adopted. They lived in Sussex where they were active in the local Conservative Party. However they defected to Oswald Mosley's British Union of Fascists (BUF) soon after its creation in 1932 and she became prominent in the women's section. During this time, she encountered Wilfred Risdon, Director of Propaganda 1933–4, who was later a colleague in the LPAVS. She was a frequent contributor to the fascist press and in November 1936 was put forward as the BUF's prospective parliamentary candidate for the Northampton constituency, but no general election was held during the Second World War. Mosley used her suffragette past to counter the criticism that National Socialism was anti-feminist saying that her prospective candidacy "killed for all time the suggestion that National Socialism proposed putting British women back in the home".

In May 1940 Norah and Dudley Elam were detained under Defence Regulation 18B and she was interned in Holloway Prison with several other female fascists including Diana Mosley. After her release, Norah and Dudley Elam escorted Unity Mitford to see Diana and Oswald Mosley in Holloway on 18 March 1943.

== Family ==
Elam had one son, Evelyn (born 1922). Her granddaughter, Angela McPherson, described in a 2010 BBC Radio 4 documentary, Mother Was a Blackshirt, that she had no idea until 2002 of the role Elam played in the fascist movement. McPherson knew that Elam had been a suffragette who claimed to have been close to the Pankhursts; a decision to search online for information about Norah Elam started to throw up information she had not been aware of. McPherson felt that she had subconsciously blocked out disturbing memories of the stories her grandmother told her as a child, which were to affect her family. She described Elam as a "dreadful racist" who emotionally damaged her son, turning him into a "bullying misogynist" imitation of Norah's own father. A biography, Mosley's Old Suffragette, written by Susan McPherson and Angela McPherson, was published in 2011.
