= Women's Social and Political Union =

UK movement for women's suffrage, 1903–1918

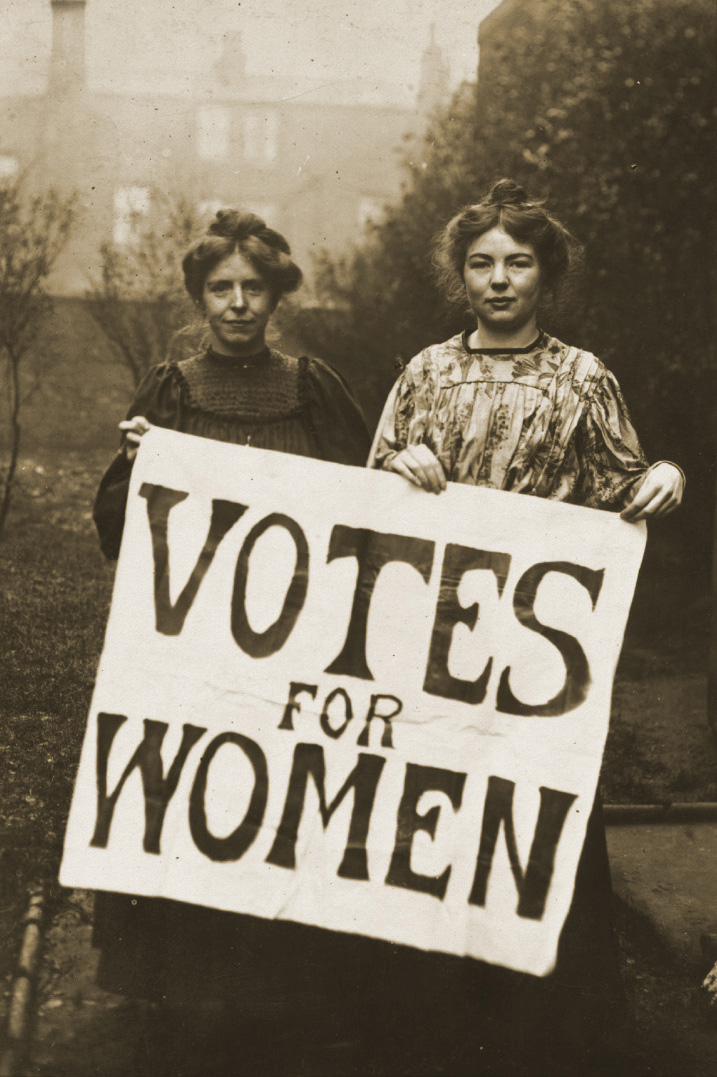
- Annie Kenney (left) and Christabel Pankhurst, c. 1908
- Abbreviation: WSPU
- Formation: 10 October 1903
- Founders: Emmeline Pankhurst; Christabel Pankhurst
- Founded at: 62 Nelson Street, Manchester, England
- Dissolved: 1917/1918
- Type: Women-only political movement
- Purpose: Votes for women
- Motto: "Deeds, not words"
- Headquarters: 4 Clement's Inn, Strand, London; Lincoln's Inn House, Kingsway, London
- Methods: Demonstrations, marches, direct action, hunger strikes, bombings, standing for election.

The Women's Social and Political Union (WSPU) was a women-only political movement and leading militant organisation campaigning for women's suffrage in the United Kingdom founded in 1903. Known from 1906 as the suffragettes, its membership and policies were tightly controlled by Emmeline Pankhurst and her daughters Christabel and Sylvia.

The WSPU membership became known for civil disobedience and direct action. Emmeline Pankhurst described them as engaging in a "reign of terror". Group members heckled politicians, held demonstrations and marches, broke the law to force arrests, broke windows in prominent buildings, set fire to or introduced chemicals into postboxes thus injuring several postal workers, and committed a series of arsons that killed at least five people and injured at least 24. When imprisoned, the group's members engaged in hunger strikes and were subject to force-feeding. Emmeline Pankhurst said the group's goal was "to make England and every department of English life insecure and unsafe."

The WSPU is also noted for its participation in the White Feather Campaign, a practice of handing out white feathers to emasculate men into joining the WW1 war effort.

== Early years ==
The Women's Social and Political Union (WSPU) was founded as an independent women's movement on 10 October 1903 at 62 Nelson Street, Manchester, home of the Pankhurst family. Emmeline Pankhurst, along with two of her daughters, Christabel and Sylvia, and her husband, Richard, before his death in 1898, had been active in the Independent Labour Party (ILP), founded in 1893 by Scottish former miner Keir Hardie, a family friend. (Hardie later founded the Labour Party.)

Emmeline Pankhurst had increasingly felt that the ILP was not there for women. On 9 October 1903, she invited a group of ILP women to meet at her home the next day, telling them: "Women, we must do the work ourselves. We must have an independent women's movement. Come to my house tomorrow and we will arrange it!"

Membership of the WSPU was open to women only – men could not become members. It also had no party affiliation.

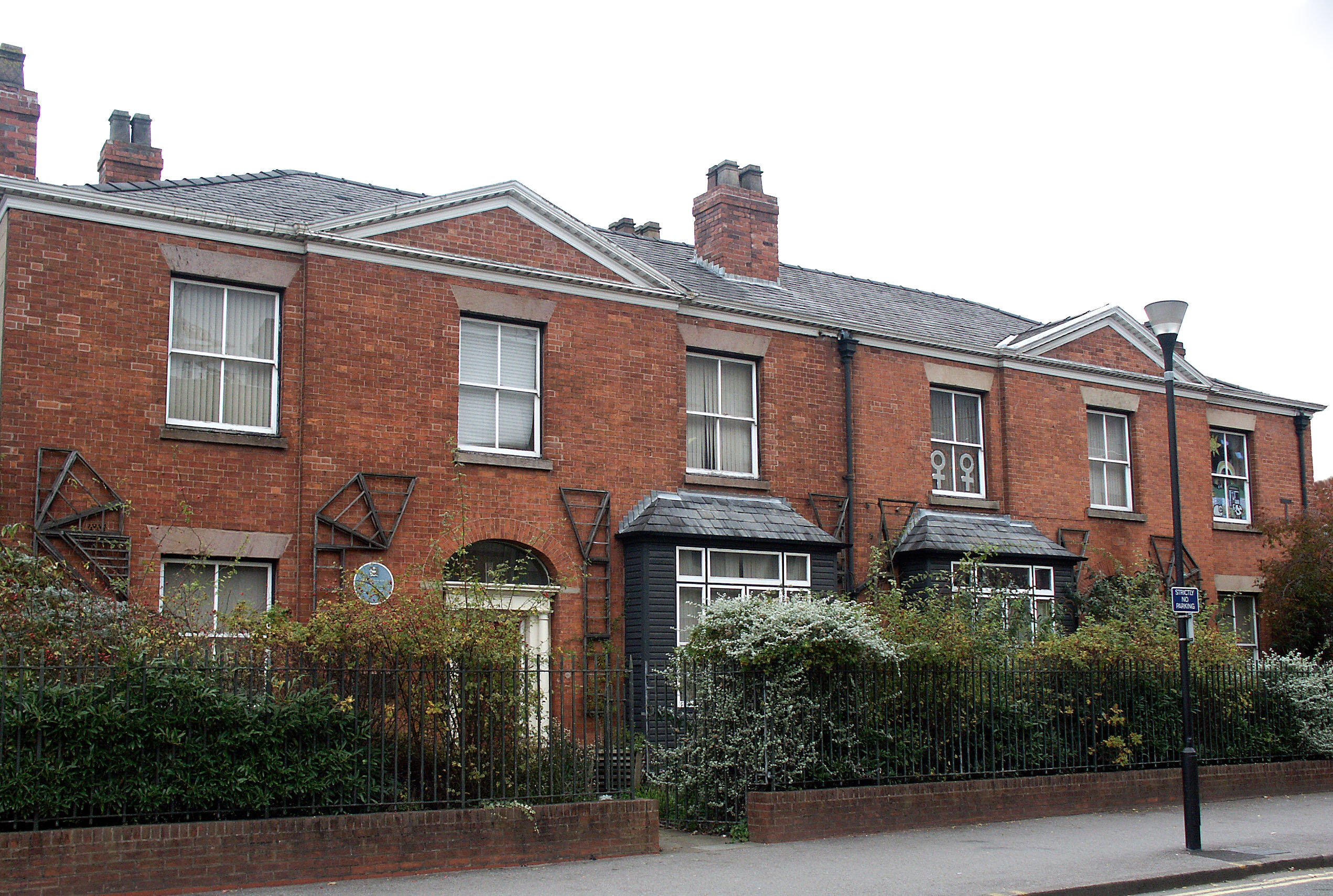
62 Nelson Street, where the WSPU was formed

In 1905, the group convinced the Liberal MP Bamford Slack to introduce a women's suffrage bill; it was ultimately talked out, but the publicity spurred rapid expansion of the group. The WSPU changed tactics following the failure of the bill; they focused on attacking whichever political party was in government and refused to support any legislation which did not include enfranchisement of women. This translated into abandoning their initial commitment to also supporting immediate social reforms.

The term "suffragette" was first used in 1906 as a term of derision by the journalist Charles E. Hands in the London Daily Mail to describe activists in the movement for women's suffrage, in particular members of the WSPU. But the women he intended to ridicule embraced the term, saying "suffraGETtes" (hardening the 'g'), implying not only that they wanted the vote, but that they intended to 'get' it.

Also in 1906, the group began a series of demonstrations and lobbies of Parliament, leading to the arrest and imprisonment of growing numbers of their members. An attempt to achieve equal franchise gained national attention when an envoy of 300 women, representing over 125,000 suffragettes, argued for women's suffrage with the Prime Minister, Sir Henry Campbell-Bannerman. The Prime Minister agreed with their argument but "was obliged to do nothing at all about it" and so urged the women to "go on pestering" and to exercise "the virtue of patience".

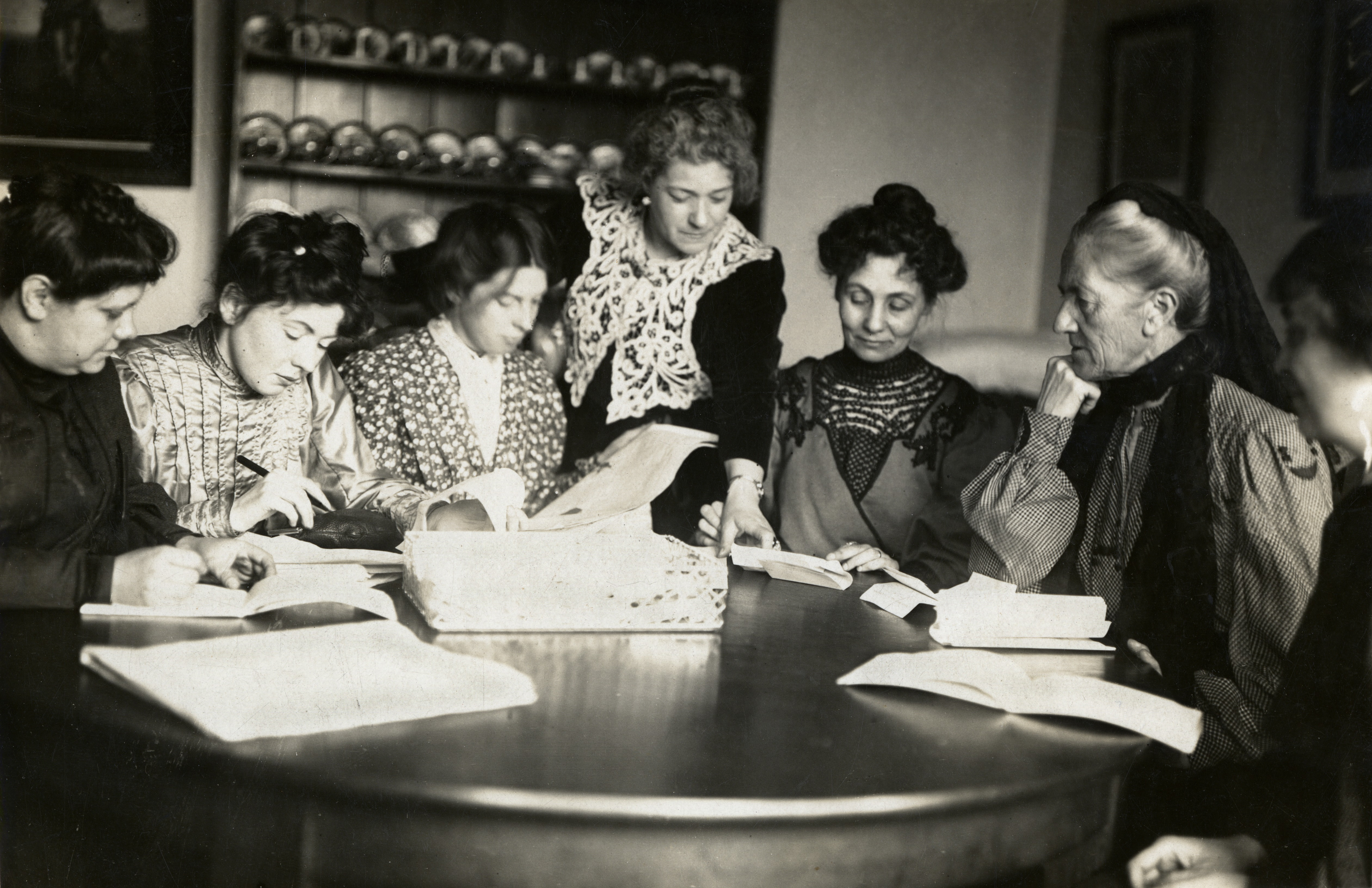
WSPU leaders Flora Drummond, Christabel Pankhurst, Annie Kenney, Emmeline Pankhurst, Charlotte Despard, with two others, 1906–1907

Some of the women Campbell-Bannerman advised to be patient had been working for women's rights for as many as fifty years: his advice to "go on pestering" would prove quite unwise. His thoughtless words infuriated the protesters and "by those foolish words the militant movement became irrevocably established, and the stage of revolt began". In 1907, the organisation held the first of several of their "Women's Parliaments".

The Labour Party then voted to support universal suffrage. This split them from the WSPU, which had always accepted the property qualifications which already applied to women's participation in local elections. Under Christabel's direction, the group began to more explicitly organise exclusively among middle-class women, and stated their opposition to all political parties. This led a small group of prominent members to leave and form the Women's Freedom League.

== Campaigning develops ==
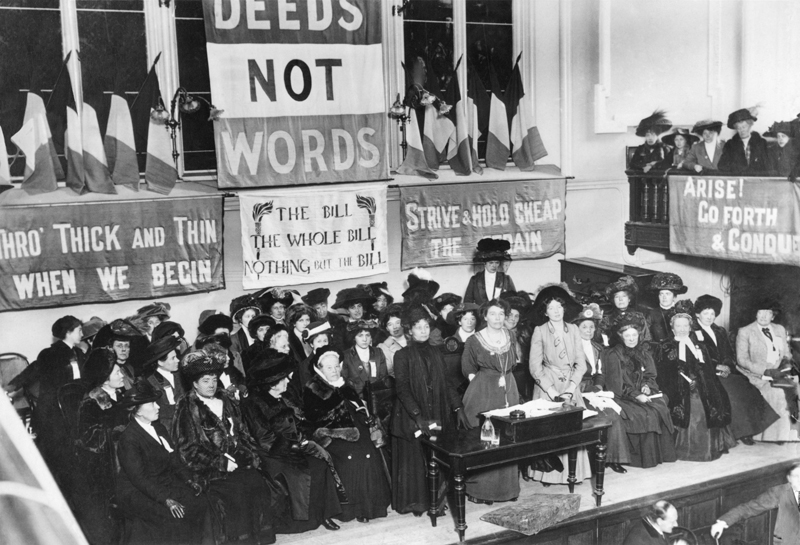
WSPU meeting, c. 1908. Emmeline Pankhurst stands (left) by the table on the platform.

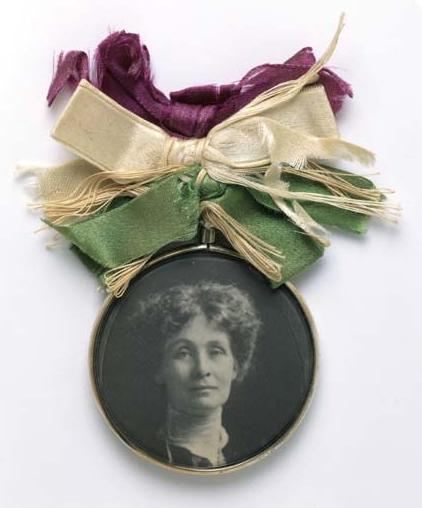
Portrait badge of Emmeline Pankhurst, c. 1909, sold by the WSPU to raise funds

Immediately following the WSPU/WFL split, in autumn 1907, Frederick Pethick-Lawrence and Emmeline Pethick-Lawrence founded the WSPU's own newspaper, Votes for Women. The Pethick-Lawrences, who were part of the leadership of the WSPU until 1912, edited the newspaper and supported it financially in the early years. Sylvia Pankhurst wrote a number of articles for the WSPU newspaper and, in 1911, published a piece on the history of the WSPU campaign. This included a detailed account of her experience during the Black Friday event in 1910.

Flag of the Women's Social and Political Union. Purple represents loyalty and dignity, white represents purity, and green represents hope

In 1908 the WSPU adopted purple, white, and green as its official colours. These colours were chosen by Emmeline Pethick-Lawrence because "Purple...stands for the royal blood that flows in the veins of every suffragette...white stands for purity in private and public life...green is the colour of hope and the emblem of spring". June 1908 saw the first major public use of these colours when the WSPU held a 300,000-strong "Women's Sunday" rally in Hyde Park. Sylvia Pankhurst designed the logo and created a number of leaflets, banners, and posters.

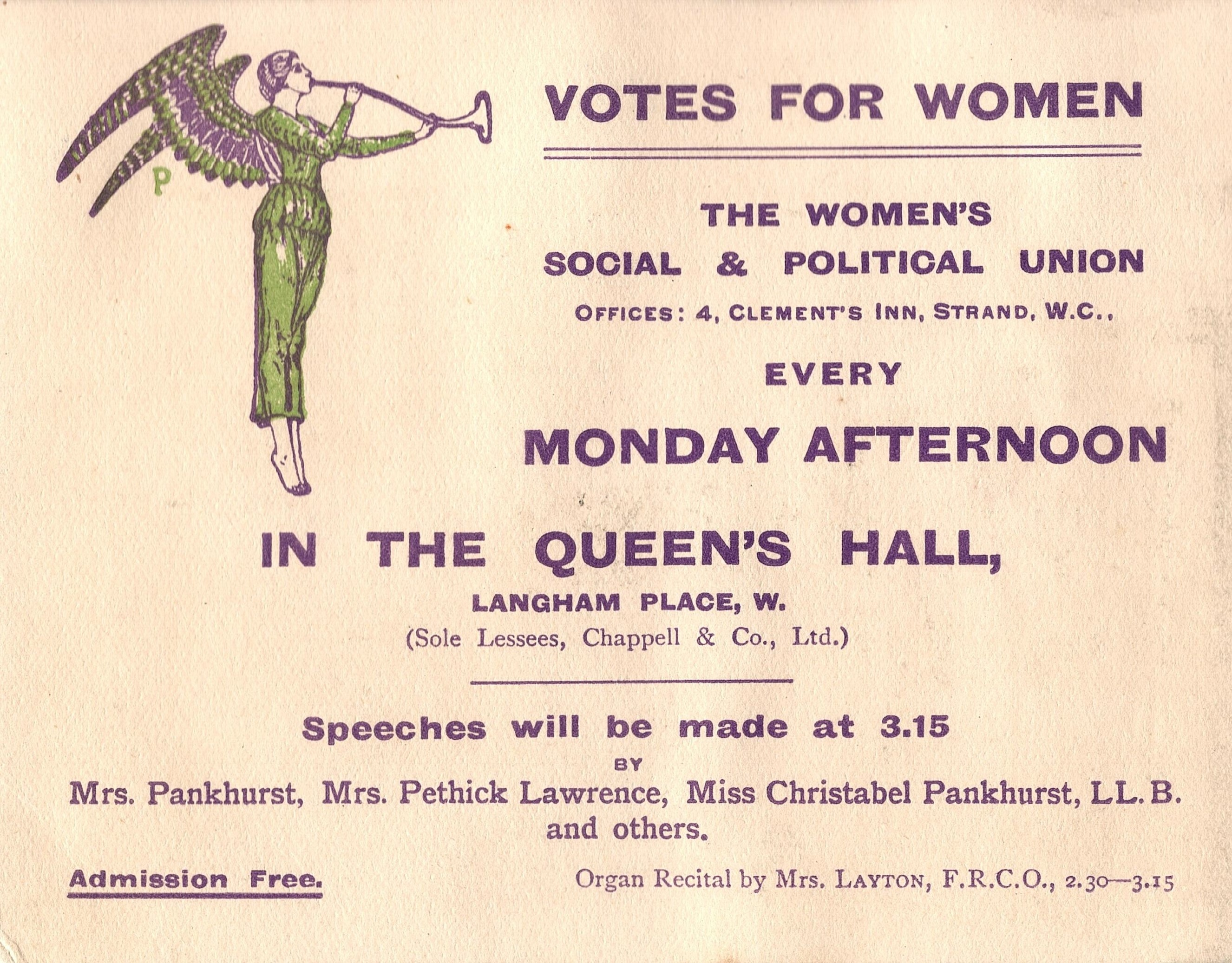
Ticket to Monday afternoon meetings at the Queen's Hall, Langham Place

In February 1907, the WSPU founded the Woman's Press, which oversaw publishing and propaganda for the organisation, and marketed a range of products from 1908 featuring the WSPU's name or colours. The woman's Press in London and WSPU chains throughout the UK operated stores selling WSPU products. A board game named Suffragetto was published circa 1908. Until January 1911, the WSPU's official anthem was "The Women's Marseillaise", a setting of words by Florence Macaulay to the tune of "La Marseillaise". In that month the anthem was changed to "The March of the Women", newly composed by Ethel Smyth with words by Cicely Hamilton.

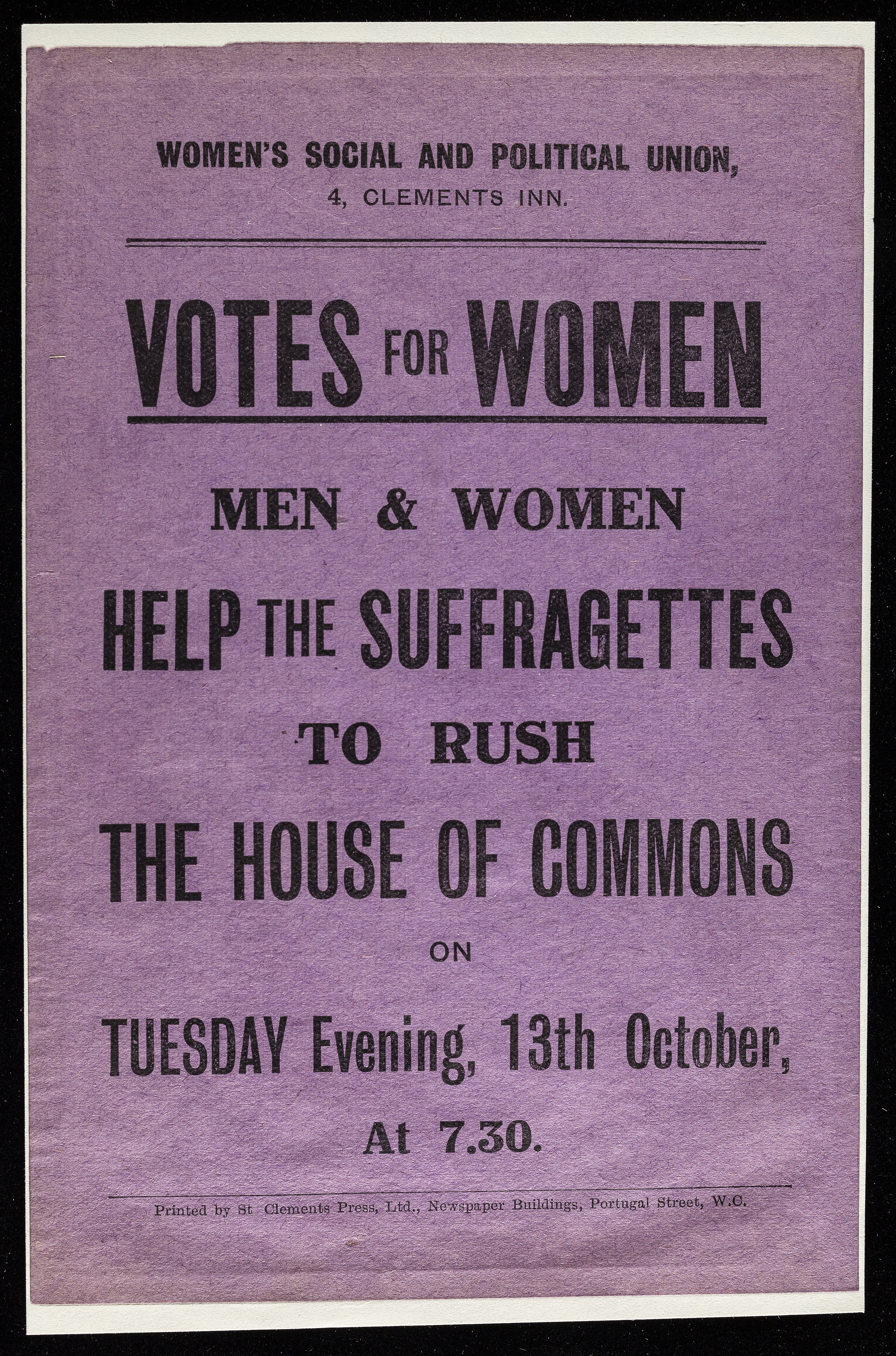
"Rush the House of Commons" flyer

On 13 October 1908, Emmeline Pankhurst together with Christabel Pankhurst and Flora Drummond organised a rush on the House of Commons. 60,000 people gathered in Parliament Square and attempts were made by suffragettes to break through the 5000 strong police cordon. Thirty-seven arrests were made, ten people were taken to hospital. On 29 June 1909, WSPU activists Ada Wright and Sarah Carwin were arrested for breaking government windows. They were sentenced to a month in prison. After breaking every window in their cells, in a protest they went on a hunger strike, following the pioneering strike of Marion Wallace Dunlop. They were released after six days.

== Direct action ==
In 1910 the Conciliation Bill, giving a limited number of propertied and married women the vote was carried on its first reading in the House of Commons, but then shelved by Prime Minister Asquith. In protest, on 18 November Emmeline Pankhurst led 300 women from a pre-arranged meeting at the Caxton Hall in a march on Parliament where they were met and roughly handled by the police. Under continued pressure from the WSPU, the Liberal government re-introduced the Conciliation Bill the following year. Exasperated by the continued opposition and by the bill's limitations, on 21 November 1911, the WSPU carried out an "official" window smash along Whitehall and Fleet Street. Its targets included the offices of the Daily Mail and the Daily News and the official residences or homes of leading Liberal politicians. 160 suffragettes were arrested. The Conciliation Bill was debated in March 1912, and was defeated by 14 votes.

The WSPU responded by organising a new and broader campaign of direct action. Once this got underway with the wholesale smashing of shop windows, the government ordered arrests of the leadership. Although they had disagreed with strategy, Frederick and Emmeline Pethwick-Lawrence, were sentenced to nine months imprisonment for conspiracy and successfully sued for the cost of the property damage.

Some WSPU militants, however, were prepared to go beyond outrages against property. On 18 July 1912, in Dublin Mary Leigh threw a hatchet that narrowly missed the head of the visiting prime minister H. H. Asquith. Instead, it hit the ear of John Redmond, leader of the Irish Parliamentary Party, who was seated next to Asquith. Redmond was not seriously injured. On 29 January 1913, several letter bombs were sent to the Chancellor of the Exchequer, David Lloyd George, and the prime minister Asquith, but they all exploded in post offices, post boxes or in mailbags while in transit across the country. Between February and March 1913, railway signal wires were purposely cut on lines across the country endangering train journeys.

On 19 February 1913, as part of a wider suffragette bombing and arson campaign, a bomb was set off in Pinfold Manor, the country home of the Chancellor of the Exchequer, Lloyd George, which brought down ceilings and cracked walls. On the evening of the incident Emmeline Pankhurst claimed responsibility, announcing at a public meeting in Cardiff, we have "blown up the Chancellor of the Exchequer's house". Pankhurst was willing to be arrested for the incident saying "I have advised, I have incited, I have conspired"; and that if she was arrested for the incident she would prove that the "punishment unjustly imposed upon women who have no voice in making the laws cannot be carried out". On 3 April, Pankhurst was sentenced to three years' penal servitude for procuring and inciting women to commit "malicious injuries to property". The Temporary Discharge for Ill Health Bill was rushed through Parliament to ensure that Pankhurst, who had immediately gone on hunger strike, did not die in prison.

In response to the bomb Lloyd George wrote an article in Nash's Magazine, entitled "Votes for Women and Organised Lunacy" where he argued that the "main obstacle to women getting the vote is militancy". It had alienated those who would have supported them. The only way for women to get the vote is a new movement "absolutely divorced from stones and bombs and torches".

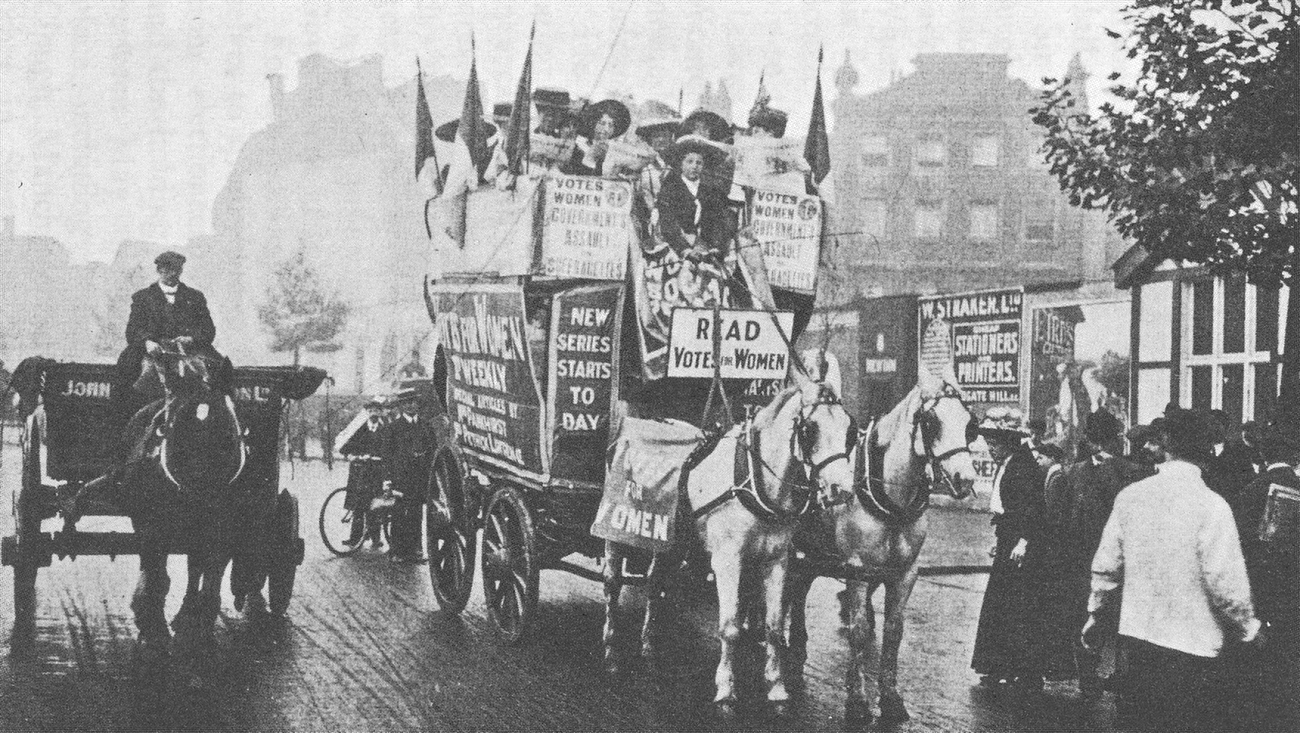
The WSPU in Kingsway, c. 1911

In April 1913, Dorothy Evans, posted as an organiser to the north of Ireland, was arrested in Belfast on explosive charges. Together with local activist Midge Muir, she created uproar in court demanding to know why the gun-running Ulster Unionist James Craig was not appearing on the same charges.

On 30 April, the WSPU offices were raided by the police, and a number of women were arrested and taken to Bow Street. They were Flora Drummond, Harriett Roberta Kerr, Agnes Lake, Rachel Barrett, Laura Geraldine Lennox, and Beatrice Sanders. All were charged under the Malicious Damage Act 1861 (24 & 25 Vict. c. 97), found guilty and received various sentences.

In June 1913, Emily Davison was killed while attempting to drape a suffragette banner on the King's horse as it was racing in the Epsom Derby—an incident famously captured on film.

On the evening of 9 March 1914 in Glasgow, about 40 militant suffragettes, including members of the Bodyguard team, brawled with several squads of police constables who were attempting to re-arrest Emmeline Pankhurst during a pro-suffrage rally at St. Andrew's Hall. The following day, suffragette Mary Richardson (known as one of the most militant activists, also called "Slasher" Richardson) walked into the National Gallery in London and attacked Diego Velázquez's painting, Rokeby Venus with a meat cleaver. Her action stimulated a wave of attacks on artworks that would continue for five months. In June, militants had placed a bomb beneath the Coronation Chair in Westminster Abbey.

Released following a hunger strike, in July 1914 Dorothy Evans was again arrested in Belfast. With a sister Hunger Strike Medalist, Lillian Metge, she was implicated in a series of arson attacks and the bombing of Lisburn Cathedral.

== White Feather Movement ==
The WSPU was the keen force behind the White Feather Campaign, a prominent enlistment campaign and shaming ritual in Britain during the First World War, in which women gave white feathers to non-enlisting men, symbolising cowardice and shaming them into signing up.

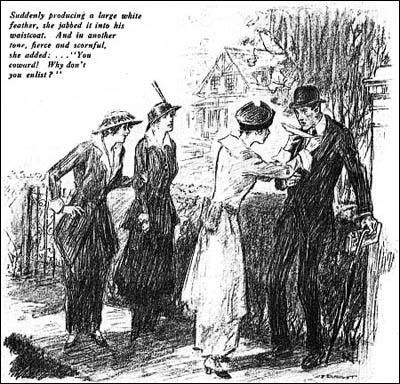
"The White Feather: A Sketch of English Recruiting" (Arnold Bennett, 1914)

The British government, keen to secure the support of these influential militants, released all WSPU suffragettes from prison in August 1914, effectively striking a bargain: the WSPU would suspend its suffrage agitation and devote its energies to recruiting men and mobilising women for war work. Emmeline Pankhurst declared that suffragettes must now "fight for their country as they fought for the vote," telling her followers that the struggle for women's rights would be meaningless if Britain itself were defeated. The movement also received a £2,000 grant from the government to aid in campaigning.

At a mass demonstration in 1915 billed as the "Women's Right to Serve" procession, Pankhurst led 30,000 women through London with banners encouraging men to participate in the War. Sylvia Pankhurst later recounted that during Emmeline's recruiting tours, WSPU members "handed out white feathers to every young man they encountered wearing civilian dress" According to Sylvia, WSPU enthusiasts would even appear at public meetings waving placards reading "Intern Them All" – a sign of their ultra-patriotic fervour against allegedly unpatriotic men and enemy aliens. Sylvia later speculated that the WSPU's women and the unofficial white feather distributors were "one in the same."

== Hunger strikes ==
In response to the continuing and repeated imprisonment of many of their members, the WSPU extended and supported prison hunger strikes. The authorities' policy of force feeding won the suffragettes public sympathy and induced the government later passed the Prisoners (Temporary Discharge for Ill Health) Act 1913. More commonly known as the "Cat and Mouse Act", this allowed the release of suffragettes, close to death due to malnourishment, and their re-arrest once health was restored. Olive Beamish (who used the false name Phyllis Brady) and Elsie Duval (who used the false name Millicent Dean) were the first prisoners released under the Act.

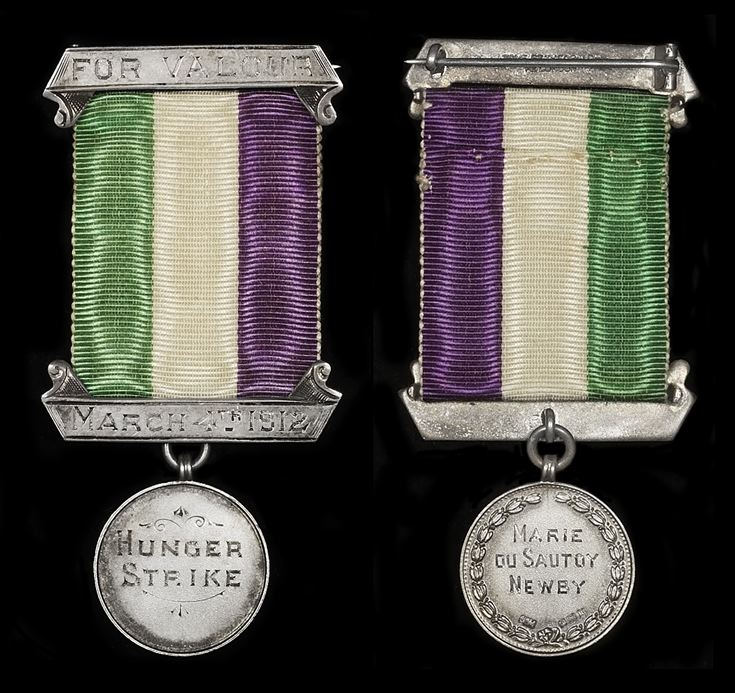
Hunger Strike Medal awarded to Marie du Sautoy Newby

The WSPU fought back: their all-women security team known as the Bodyguard, trained in ju-jitsu by Edith Margaret Garrud and led by Gertrude Harding, protected temporarily released suffragettes from arrest and recommital. The WSPU also coordinated a campaign in which doctors such as Flora Murray and Elizabeth Gould Bell treated the imprisoned suffragettes.

A special medal, the Hunger Strike Medal, like a military honour was designed by Sylvia Pankhurst and awarded 'for Valour' to women who had been on hunger strike/force-fed.

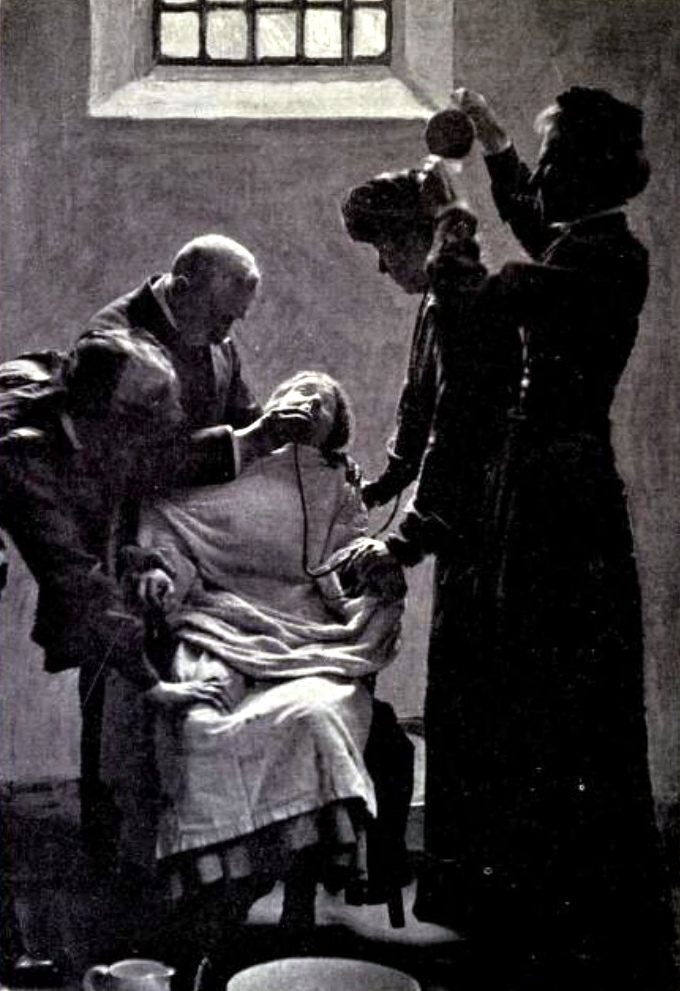
A suffragette being force-fed in Holloway Prison, London

== During the First World War ==
On the outbreak of the First World War in 1914, Christabel Pankhurst was living in Paris, in order to run the organisation without fear of arrest. Her autocratic control enabled her to declare soon after war broke out that the WSPU would abandon its campaigns in favour of patriotic support for King and Country, to which the government responded with a general amnesty prosecuted militants. The WSPU stopped publishing The Suffragette, and in April 1915 it launched a new journal, Britannia.

There were dissenters, among them Hunger Strike Medallist Kitty Marion, and Dorothy Evans with many of her more militant comrades. These included, in Belfast, Elizabeth McCracken (the feminist writer "L.A.M. Priestly") who protested that while men had subjected militant suffragists to a campaign "vituperation and invective", they were now asking women to approve "the most aggravated form of militancy—war". "What country is theirs", she asked, "who are defrauded of citizenship". In 1915, McCracken invited Sylvia Pankhurst who likewise defied her sister's call for a wartime armistice with the government, to Belfast to speak in support equal pay for women doing war work.

With Charlotte Marsh and Edith Rigby, Evans formed Independent Women's Social and Political Union (IWSPU), but this did not survive the end of the war. In November 1917, Christabel and Emmeline Pankhurst had meanwhile dissolved WSPU in favour of the Women's Party.

The Women's Party ran on the slogan "Victory, National Security and Progress", gave out white feathers to conscientious objectors, and proposed the abolition of trade unions. Following the passing of the Parliament (Qualification of Women) Act 1918, the party ran Christobel in close parliamentary contest in the 1918 general election, losing a Staffordshire seat by just 778 votes to the Labour candidate. When in 1919, Christabel accepted nomination as a Prospective Parliamentary Candidate for the ruling Conservative-dominated Coalition, the party wound itself up.

== Splits and currents ==
Differences over direct action contributed to splits in the organisation. Emmeline Pethick-Lawrence, who with her husband Frederick edited Votes for Women, was expelled in 1912. Christabel Pankhurst launched a new WPSU journal, fully committed to the militant strategy, The Suffragette. The Pethick-Lawrences then joined Agnes Harben and others in starting the United Suffragists, which was open to women and men, militants and non-militants alike.

Within the WPSU radical action was championed by the Young Hot Bloods (YHB). These were a group of younger unmarried women formed by Annie Kenney's sister Jessie Kenny and Adela Pankhurst in 1907. The group's name derived from a newspaper comment: "Mrs Pankhurst will of course be followed blindly by a number of the younger and more hot-blooded members of the Union". Members of the group included Olive Beamish, Irene Dallas, Grace Roe, Elsie Howey, Vera Wentworth and Mary Home.

Sylvia Pankhurst and her East London Federation were expelled early in 1914. They had argued for an explicitly socialist organisation, aligned with the Independent Labour Party, and focused on working-class collective action rather than individual attacks on property. They renamed themselves the East London Federation of Suffragettes (ELFS) and launched a newspaper, the Women's Dreadnought.

The historian Brian Harrison interviewed a number of WSPU members as part of his Suffrage Interviews project, titled Oral evidence on the suffragette and suffragist movements: the Brian Harrison interviews. Suffragettes spoke of their involvement with and views about the WSPU. This included:

- Grace Roe who joined the WSPU in 1908 and later replaced Annie Kenney as chief organiser after her arrest on 8 April 1913.
- Olive Bartels who spoke of understudying Roe and herself became chief organiser when Roe was subsequently arrested. Bartels had joined the WSPU in 1909 and was a regular speaker at their Cambridge meetings and involved in pillar box arson.
- Maude Kate Smith, secretary of the Birmingham WSPU branch, working alongside their organiser Dorothy Evans. Smith who also worked in the WSPU shop in John Bright Street. She took part in a number of militant acts with the WSPU and was imprisoned as a result.
- Jessie Stephen, a member of the Glasgow branch of the WSPU who took part in their militant acts before moving to London and joining in WSPU demonstrations.
- Leonora Cohen, involved in fundraising activities for the Leeds branch, leading to a position as their secretary. She was also involved in, and arrested for window-breaking in Leeds.
- Edith Fulford, a fundraiser and speaker for the WSPU in Birmingham.
- Helen Green, treasurer of the Croydon branch who broke windows at Kodak in 1912.
- Cicely Hale who did secretarial work in the Information Department of the WSPU before replacing Mary Home as head of the department in their offices in Lincoln's Inn, a role she fulfilled until 1914. Hale spoke of the department's organisation and of a police raid at their headquarters including the arrest of Beatrice Sanders, the head of finance, and Harriet Kerr, the head of the general office.
- Hazel Inglis who joined the Croydon branch of the WSPU in 1906. She was involved in advertising WSPU meetings and selling 'Votes for Women' on the streets of Croydon as well as working in their shop in Croydon, which sold scarves and other goods with the Votes for Women motto. She spoke about the methods used by the WSPU to send instructions to members who were willing to perform militant actions, and was herself imprisoned in 1912 for breaking the windows of the Post Office in Lower Regent Street with a hammer.
- Marie Lawson who chalked pavements for the WSPU and was present at their Old Essex Hall meeting on the Strand where Emmeline Pankhurst abandoned the democratic WSPU constitution.
- Connie Lewcock, a member of the WSPU in Newcastle who was involved in planning the burning of Waterhouses railway station.
- Margaret Robinson, a WSPU member in Belfast who acted as a branch delegate to a London WSPU meeting, where along with Dr Elizabeth Bell she broke windows of the shop Swan and Edgar and was sentenced to 8 weeks in Holloway Prison.
- Various relatives were also interviewed including Myra Sadd Browne's daughter, about her mother's imprisonment for the WSPU; Emma Perry's niece, about her Aunt's active involvement in the Romford branch, their corner street meetings and their shop at 32b Romford Road; Dorothy Evans' daughter about her mother's organisation of the Birmingham branch, and Lucy Mabel O'Brien's (aka Mabel Purser) daughter, about her mother's accommodation of refugees from the Cat and Mouse act, and imprisonment for window breaking.
- Other interviewees spoke of their dislike of WSPU militancy, including Letitia Fairfield, who joined and then left, fearing the impact of militancy on her career, Sybil Thorndike, who also joined and then left, and Margaret Cole.

== Suffrage drama ==
Between 1905 and 1914 suffrage drama and theatre forums became increasingly utilised by the women's movement. Around this same time, however, the WSPU also became increasingly associated with militancy, moving from marches, demonstrations, and other public performances to more avant-garde and inflammatory "acts of violence." The organisation began using these shock tactics to demonstrate the seriousness and urgency of the cause. Their demonstrations included "window smashing, museum-painting slashing, arson, fuse box bombing, and telegraph line cutting,"—suffrage playwrights, in turn, began using their work to combat the negative press around the movement and attempted to demonstrate in performance how these acts of violence only occur as a last resort. They attempted to transform the negative, yet popular perspective of these militant acts as being the actions of irrational, hysterical, 'overly-emotional' women and instead demonstrate how these protests were merely the only logical response to being denied a basic fundamental right.

Suffragettes not only used theatre to their advantage, but they also employed the use of comedy. The Women's Social and Political Union was one of the first organisations to capitalise on comedic satirical writing and use it to outwit their opposition. It not only helped them diffuse hostility towards their organisation, but also helped them gain an audience. This use of satire allowed them to express their ideas and frustrations as well as combat gender prejudices in a safer way. Suffrage speakers, who often held open-air meetings in order to reach a wider audience, had to face hostile audiences and learn how to deal with interruptions. The most successful speakers, therefore, had to acquire a quick wit and learn to "always to get the best of a joke, and to join in the laughter with the audience even if the joke was against" them. Suffragette Annie Kenney recalls an elderly man continuously jeering "if you were my wife I'd give you poison" throughout the course of her speech, to which she replied "yes, and if I were your wife I'd take it," diffusing threats and making her antagonist appear laughable.

== Notable members ==
- Violet Aitken
- Mary Ann Aldham
- Janie Allan
- Doreen Allen
- Helen Archdale
- Ethel Ayres Purdie
- Barbara Ayrton
- Norah Balls
- Olive Beamish
- Edith Marian Begbie
- Rosa May Billinghurst
- Teresa Billington-Greig
- Violet Bland
- Bettina Borrmann Wells
- Elsie Bowerman
- Janet Boyd
- Bertha Brewster
- Constance Bryer
- Lady Constance Bulwer-Lytton
- Evaline Hilda Burkitt
- Lucy Burns
- Florence Canning
- Sarah Carwin
- Eileen Mary Casey
- Joan Cather
- Georgina Fanny Cheffins
- Ellen Melicent Cobden
- Leonora Cohen
- Maria Colby
- Annie Coultate
- Isabel Cowe
- Helen Millar Craggs
- Ellen Crocker
- Helen Cruickshank
- Louie Cullen
- Alice Davies
- Emily Davison
- Charlotte Despard
- Violet Mary Doudney
- Edith Downing
- Flora Drummond
- Bessie Drysdale
- Sophia Duleep Singh
- Lilla Durham
- Elsie Duval
- Una Duval
- Norah Elam
- Dorothy Evans
- Kate Williams Evans
- Theresa Garnett
- Louisa Garrett Anderson
- Edith Margaret Garrud
- Katharine Gatty
- Mary Gawthorpe
- Katie Edith Gliddon
- Nellie Hall
- Cicely Hamilton
- Beatrice Harraden
- Alice Hawkins
- Edith How-Martyn
- Elsie Howey
- Ellen Isabel Jones
- Annie Kenney
- Harriet Kerr
- Edith Key
- Agnes Lake
- Aeta Adelaide Lamb
- Clara Lambert
- Mary Leigh
- Lilian Lenton
- Constance Lytton
- Mary Macarthur
- Florence Macfarlane
- Margaret Macfarlane
- Mildred Mansel
- Margaret McPhun
- Frances McPhun
- Margaret Mackworth, 2nd Viscountess Rhondda
- Grace Marcon
- Christabel Marshall
- Kitty Marion
- Dora Marsden
- Lillian Metge
- Dora Montefiore
- Alice Morrissey
- Flora Murray
- Margaret Nevinson
- Edith New
- Adela Pankhurst
- Christabel Pankhurst
- Emmeline Pankhurst
- Sylvia Pankhurst
- Frances Parker
- Alice Paul
- Emmeline Pethick-Lawrence
- Caroline Phillips
- Ellen Pitfield
- Isabella Potbury
- Aileen Preston
- Mary Richardson
- Edith Rigby
- Rona Robinson
- Mary Russell, Duchess of Bedford
- Bertha Ryland
- Amy Sanderson
- Arabella Scott
- Muriel Scott
- Genie Sheppard
- Alice Maud Shipley
- Dame Ethel Mary Smyth
- Harriet Shaw Weaver
- Evelyn Sharp
- Hope Squire
- Janie Terrero
- Dora Thewlis
- Catherine Tolson
- Helen Tolson
- Florence Tunks
- Julia Varley
- Alice Vickery
- Marion Wallace Dunlop
- Vera Wentworth
- Mathilde Wolff Van Sandau
- Patricia Woodlock
- Gertrude Wilkinson
- Laura Annie Willson
- Laetitia Withall
- Olive Wharry
- Celia Wray
- Ada Wright
- Rose Emma Lamartine Yates
- Myra Sadd Brown
- Cicely Hale
- Letitia Fairfield
- Connie Lewcock

== See also ==
- Feminism in the United Kingdom
- Girl power
- List of suffragette bombings
- List of suffragists and suffragettes
- Women's suffrage organizations
- List of women's rights activists
- List of women's rights organizations
- Men's League for Women's Suffrage
- White Feather Campaign
- Suffragette bombing and arson campaign
- Timeline of women's suffrage
- Women's empowerment
- Women's rights
