= Cicely Hale =

English suffragette, health visitor and author (1884–1981)

- Born: 5 September 1884
- Died: 28 May 1981 (aged 96)
- Occupation(s): Suffragette, Health Visitor

Cicely Bertha Hale (5 September 1884 – 28 May 1981) was an English suffragette, health visitor, and author.

== Biography ==
In 1908, having been inspired by hearing Christabel Pankhurst and Emmeline Pankhurst speak, Hale became an assistant to Mary Home in the information department at the Women's Social and Political Union headquarters. Mary Home and Aeta Lamb were said, by Mary Leigh, to be the "brains" behind Christabel Pankhurst's speeches. While there Hale offered a news-cutting and research service, and in 1912 she became in charge of the department. Hale also typeset The Suffragette newspaper (eventually renamed The Britannia) until 1916, when her father retired and she was thus left without a home or an allowance.

Hale then trained as a health visitor, as well as obtaining training for the certificate of the Central Midwives' Board. She eventually became health visitor superintendent of the Salisbury Street clinic, holding the job for sixteen years. For nine years she wrote a weekly column about babies for the Woman's Own magazine. She also wrote the book Can I Help you with Baby?, which had three editions.

In 1947, Hale met Mary Cuningham Chater, who was the music adviser to the Girl Guides Association, and she herself subsequently became division secretary to the Arun Valley Guides, as well as helping to assemble the International Song Books, running a Brownie group, and acting as camp nurse for three summers. She published her memoir in 1975, and after that spoke on the radio, in schools, and on television as one of a few living suffragettes.

Brian Harrison recorded an oral history interview with Hale, in November 1974, as part of the Suffrage Interviews project, titled Oral evidence on the suffragette and suffragist movements: the Brian Harrison interviews. Hale talks about her involvement with the WSPU, the work of its Information Department, and about her colleagues, Mary Home, and Aeta Lamb. The interview collection also contains an interview with Hale's sister, Lady Beatrice Ricardo.

Hale lived with policewoman Ann Campbell for twenty years. Campbell died in 1941, and Hale later lived in Mary Cuningham Chater's home from 1950 to 1965, after which they obtained homes next to each other.

== Legacy ==
In 2018 a plaque and tree honouring Hale were dedicated in Marina Gardens, Littlehampton, West Sussex.
