= The Suffragette (newspaper) =

British Women's Social and Political Union newspaper

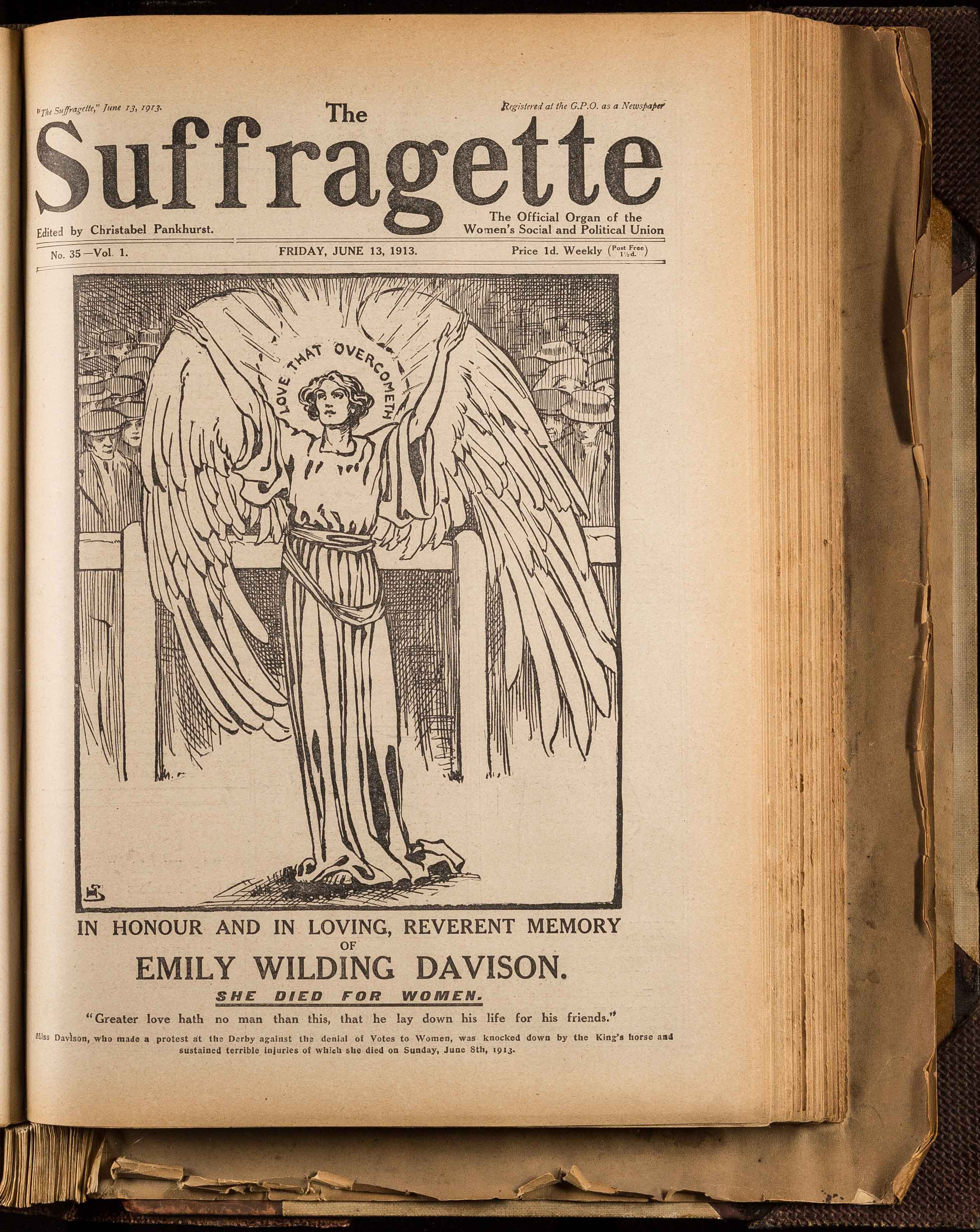
- The Suffragette memorial issue to Emily Wilding Davison, 1913
- Editor: Christabel Pankhurst; Annie Kenney
- Categories: Newspaper
- Frequency: Weekly
- Circulation: 17,000
- Publisher: Victoria House Printing Company
- First issue: 1912
- Final issue Number: 20 December 1918; 271
- Country: United Kingdom of Great Britain and Ireland
- Based in: London
- Language: English

The Suffragette was a newspaper associated with the women's suffrage movement in the United Kingdom, as "the Official Organ of the Women’s Social and Political Union" (WSPU). It replaced the previous journal of the organisation, Vote for Women, in 1912, and its name changed to Britannia after the outbreak of World War I.

== History ==
Until 1912, Votes for Women, edited and financed by Emmeline Pethick-Lawrence and Frederick Pethick-Lawrence, 1st Baron Pethick-Lawrence, was the official newspaper of the WSPU. The Pethick-Lawrences were expelled from the WSPU in 1912, as they objected to the militant tactics that were beginning to be used by suffragettes, and thereafter they published Votes for Women independently.

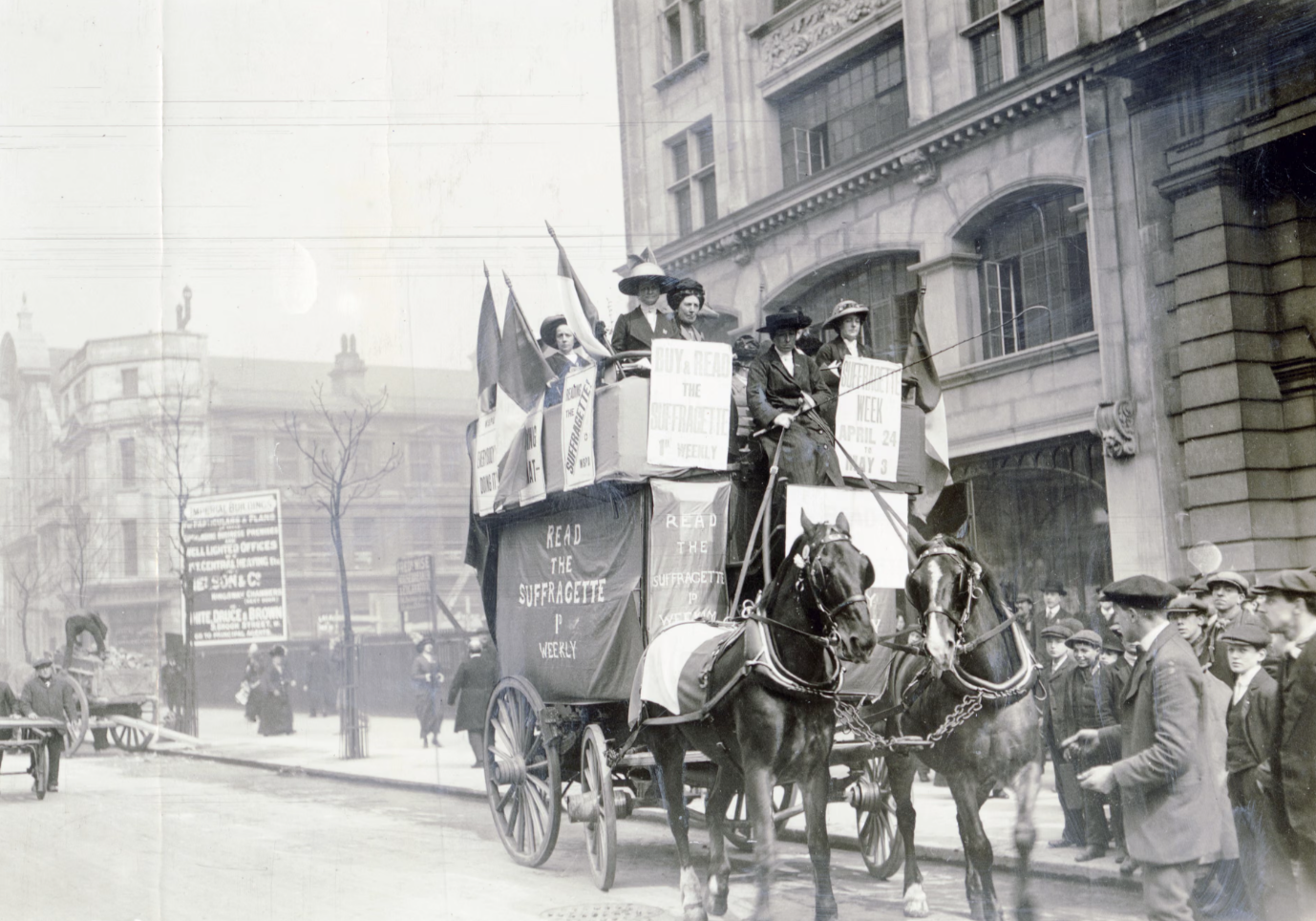
Carriage advertising The Suffragette with Norah Smyth driving in 1912

The replacement WSPU newspaper, The Suffragette cost 1d, and was initially edited by Christabel Pankhurst, daughter of Emmeline Pankhurst. The first issue was published on 17 October 1912, with typesetting by Cicely Hale. The Suffragette's business manager Agnes Lake often liaised with Emmeline and Christabel Pankhurst about improving the publications content and layout during its run.

Princess Sophia Duleep Singh lived in a grace and favour apartment in Hampton Court Palace and had a pitch outside where she sold The Suffragette. Copies were also sold at public events like the Henley Royal Regatta in July 1913. In 1913, a memorial issue was released commemorating the death of Emily Wilding Davison.

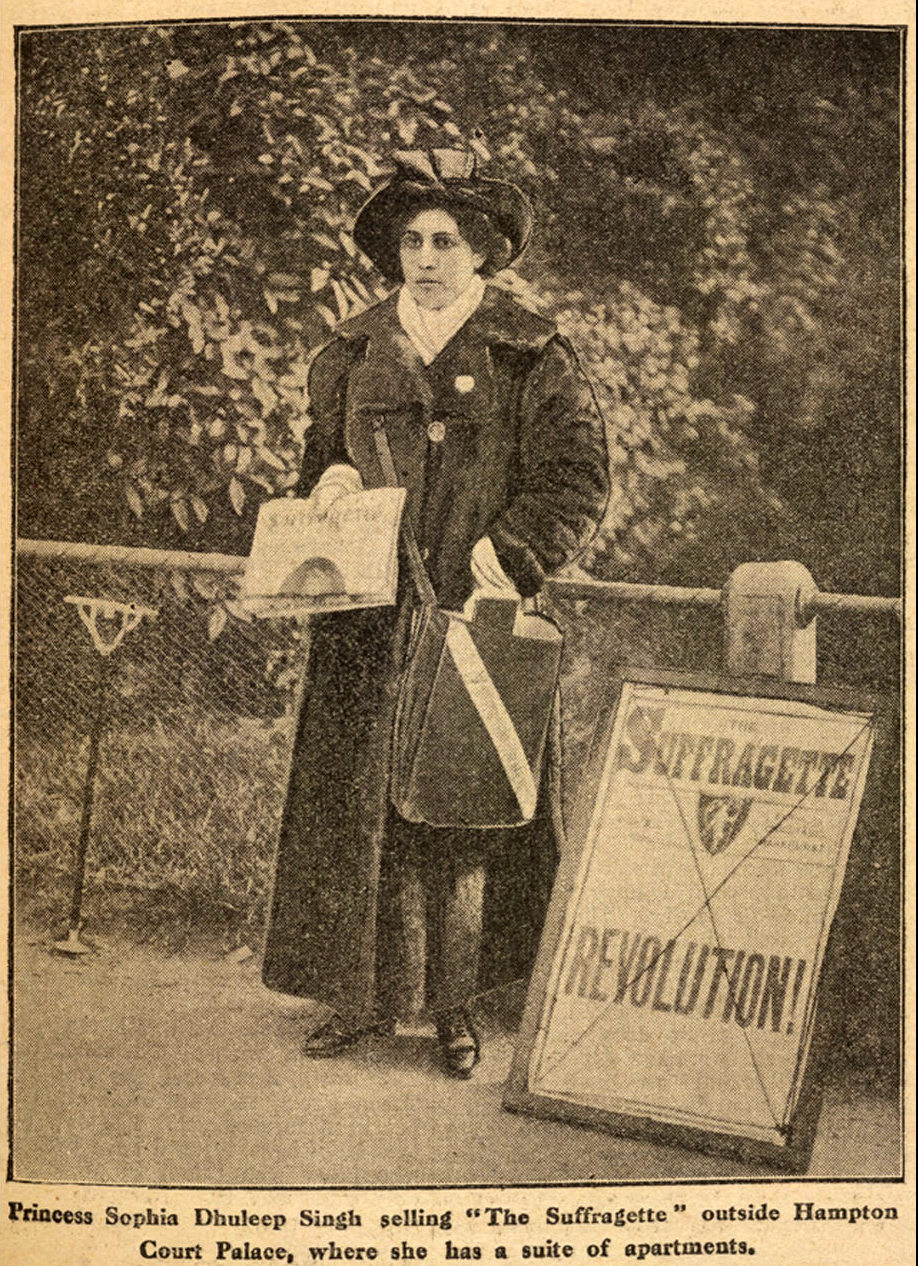
Sophia Duleep Singh selling The Suffragette outside Hampton Court Palace.

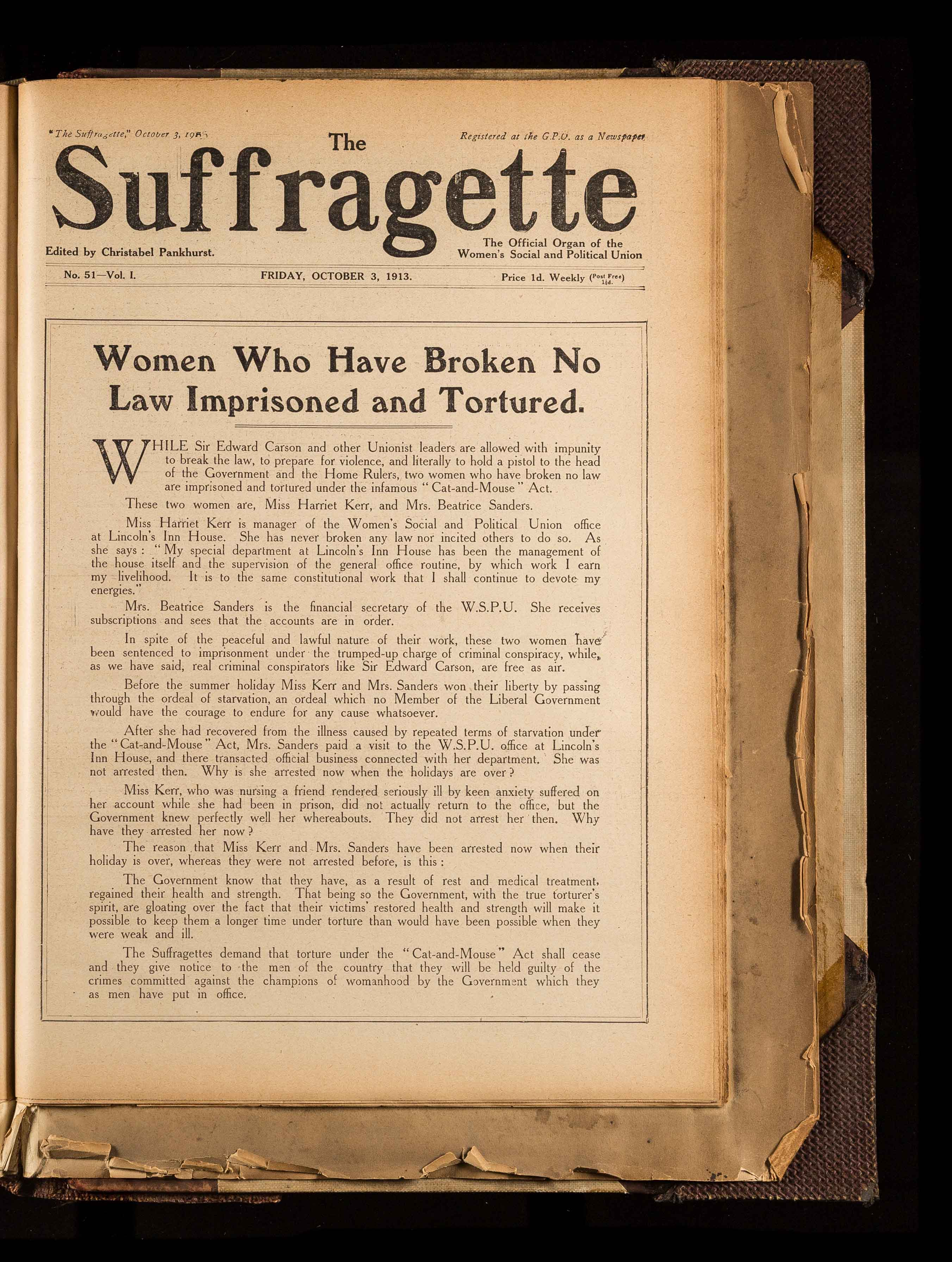
Front page of The Suffragette, 3 October 1913, reporting the arrests of Kerr and Sanders

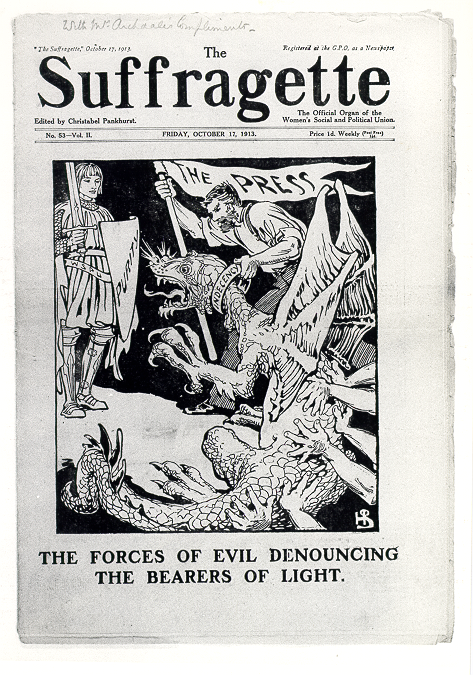
A 1913 edition of The Suffragette

On 30 April 1913, the newspaper business manager Agnes Lake was arrested alongside Beatrice Sanders, Rachel Barrett, Harriet Kerr and Flora Drummond, in a police raid of the WSPU headquarters. On 2nd May 1913, Sidney Granville Drew, the managing director of Victoria House Printing Company who printed the newspaper, was arrested. Another subsequent printer, Edgar Whitely, was also arrested and was charged for inciting people to commit crime and join the WSPU. All of the copy being set up for printing was seized by the police. To avoid arrest, editor Christabel Pankhurst fled to France, but continued to provide editorial lead to The Suffragette through visitors such as Annie Kenney and Ida Wylie who crossed the Channel for her advice.

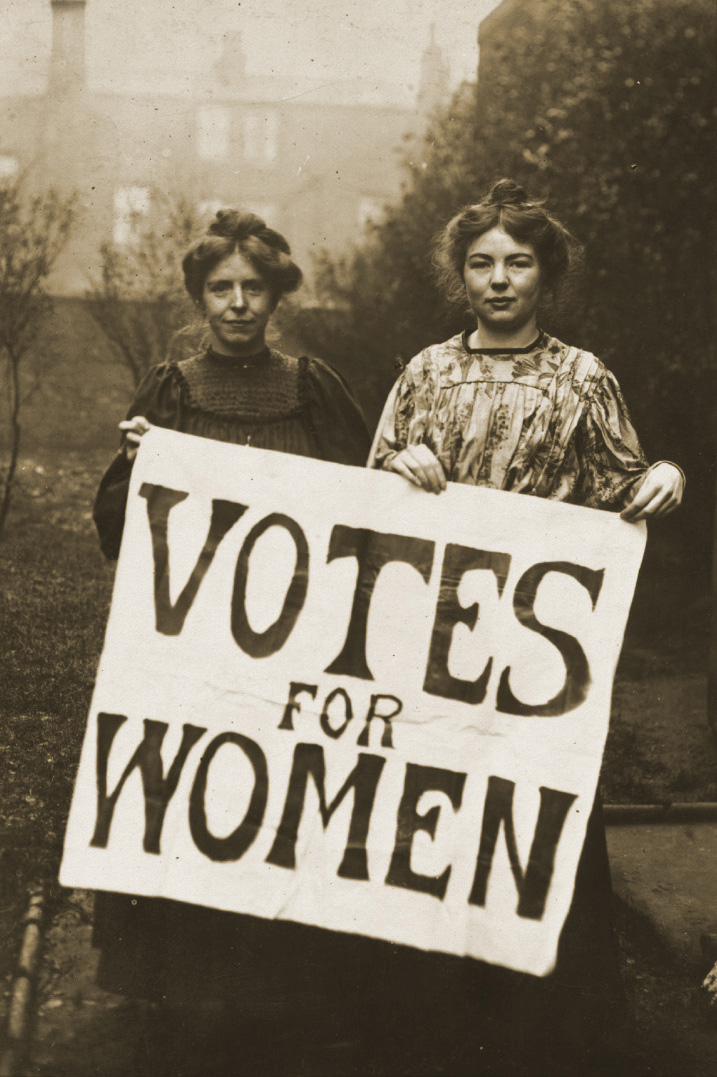
Annie Kenney and Christabel Pankhurst, editors of The Suffragette

After the raids on the WSPU headquarters and the publishers, The Suffragette was temporarily published by the printers of the Daily Herald, then outside of London by the National Labour Press in Manchester and the Scottish Newspaper Company in Edinburgh. Several news publications condemned the government raids on the newspaper and it's publishers, such as the Manchester Guardian, the Nation, and even Votes for Women.

At the outbreak of World War I, in September 1914 Christabel Pankhurst returned to Britain and the Suffragette newspaper was renamed Britannia on 15 October 1915. The paper supported the war effort, advocated to pause the campaign for women’s suffrage, and called for the military conscription of men and industrial conscription of women into national service. It published articles covering the skills of "women munition makers" and encouraging women to study science and engineering.

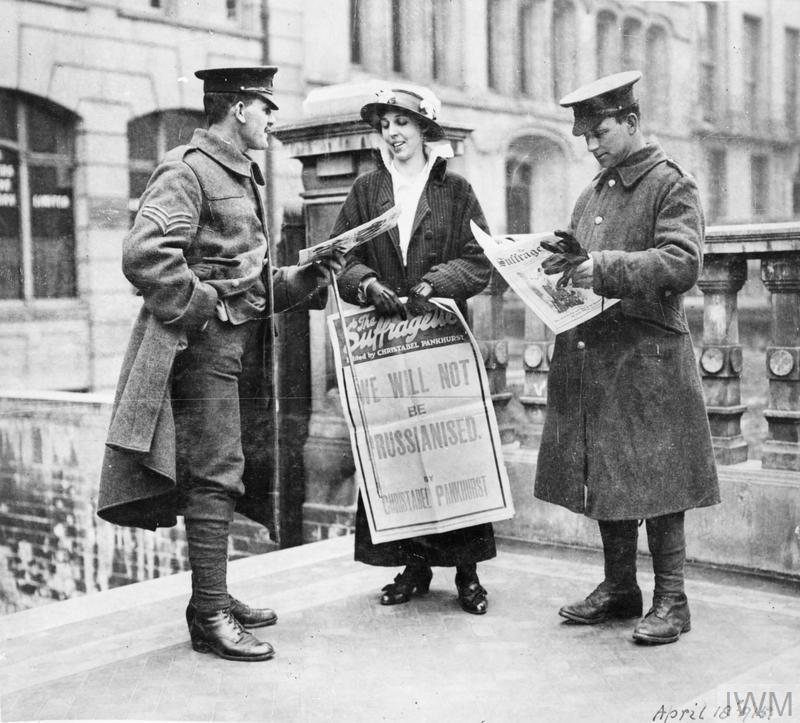
A women's suffrage activist handing out The Suffragette newspaper to British servicemen on 16 April 1915

When the Representation of the People Act 1918 was passed, Britannia produced its final copy on 20 December 1918.

== See also ==
- List of British suffragists and suffragettes
- List of women's suffrage publications
- Votes for Women (newspaper)
