= Beatrice Sanders =

British suffragette and humanist (1874–1932)

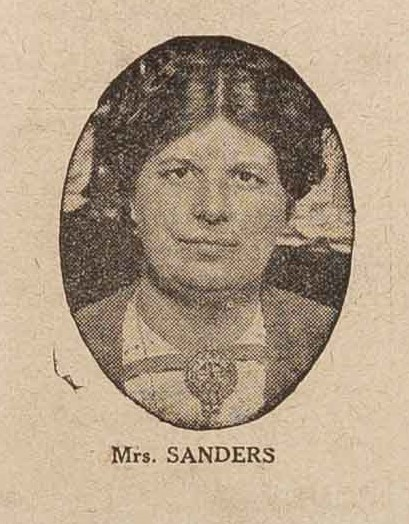
- From The Suffragette, 20 June 1913
- Born: Beatrice Helen Martin; 1874
- Died: 29 November 1932 (aged 57–58)
- Occupation: Suffragette
- Organisation(s): Women's Social and Political Union, Union of Ethical Societies, Fabian Society
- Spouse: William Stephen Sanders

Beatrice Helen Sanders (1874 – 29 November 1932) was a British suffragette and humanist, who served as financial secretary of the Women's Social and Political Union from 1904 until 1914.

== Life ==
Born Beatrice Helen Martin, her mother was a hairdresser and she worked as an assistant in her fathers' tobacconist shop before marrying a progressive social politician, William Stephen Sanders. A keen women's suffrage activist, from 1904 until 1914, she was employed, at a salary of £3 a week, as the financial secretary of the Women's Social and Political Union. Annie Kenney recalled in her memoirs Sanders' strong control of members' expenses, as they would be expected to correct errors or deficits "out of our own pocket".

Sanders worked closely with Sylvia Pankhurst, and was imprisoned for her activities on multiple occasions. On one occasion, she was sentenced to fourteen months for taking part in the events at the House of Commons in February 1907, and for a month for throwing stones on Black Friday in November 1910. By 1913, as financial secretary of the Women's Social and Political Union, she was arrested with Harriet Kerr after a struggle with police which was front-page news in The Suffragette, when the premises at Clement's Inn was raided, the sentence was fifteen days. She went on hunger strike in Lewes prison and was temporarily released under the terms of the Cat and Mouse Act, and although her sentence was never annulled, she was not re-arrested.

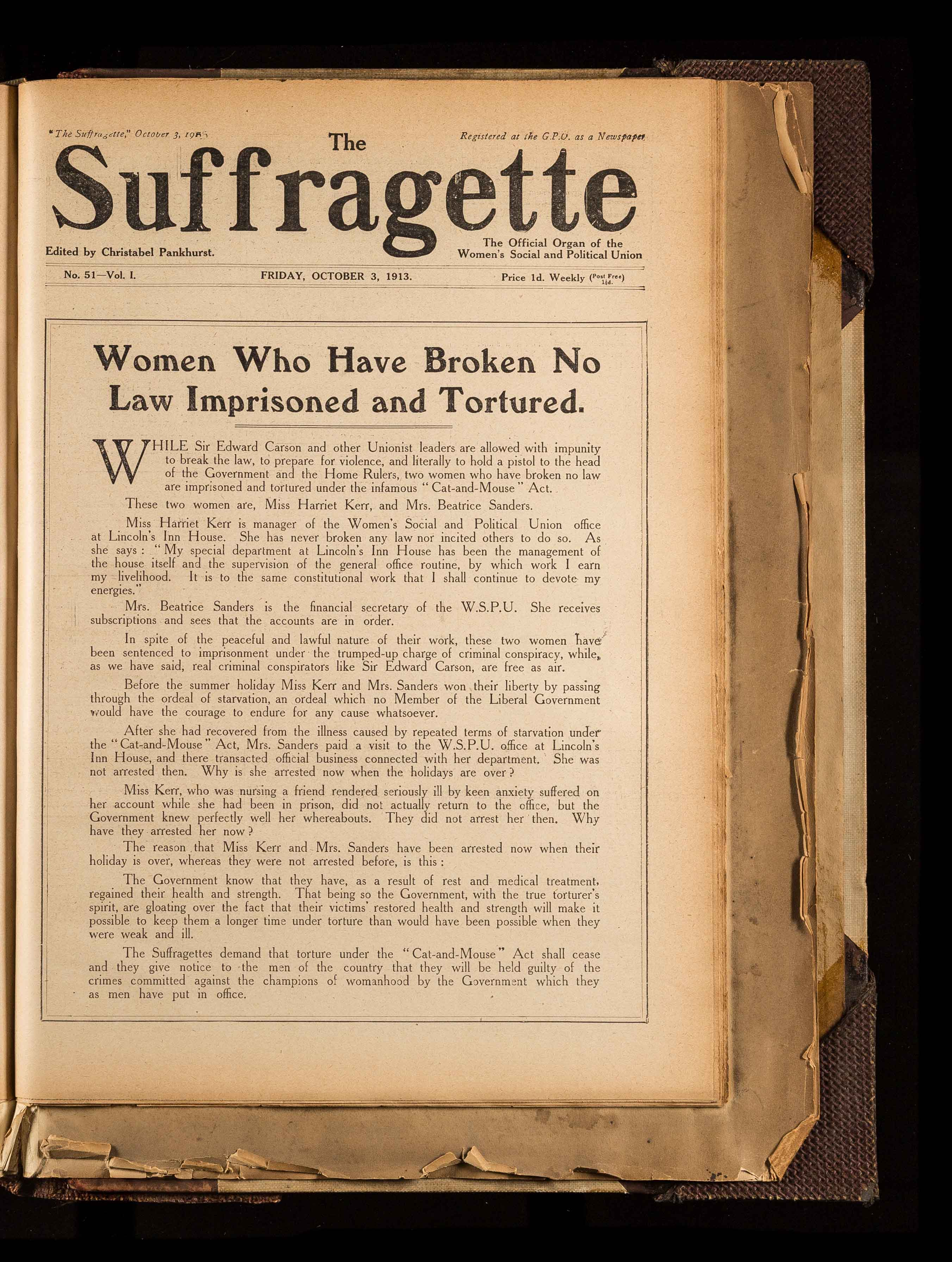
Report of the arrests of suffragettes Harriet Kerr and Sanders, from the collection of the LSE Library

Sanders' name appears on the 'Roll of Honour of Suffragette Prisoners'. She was also given a Hunger Strike Medal 'for Valour' by the WSPU.

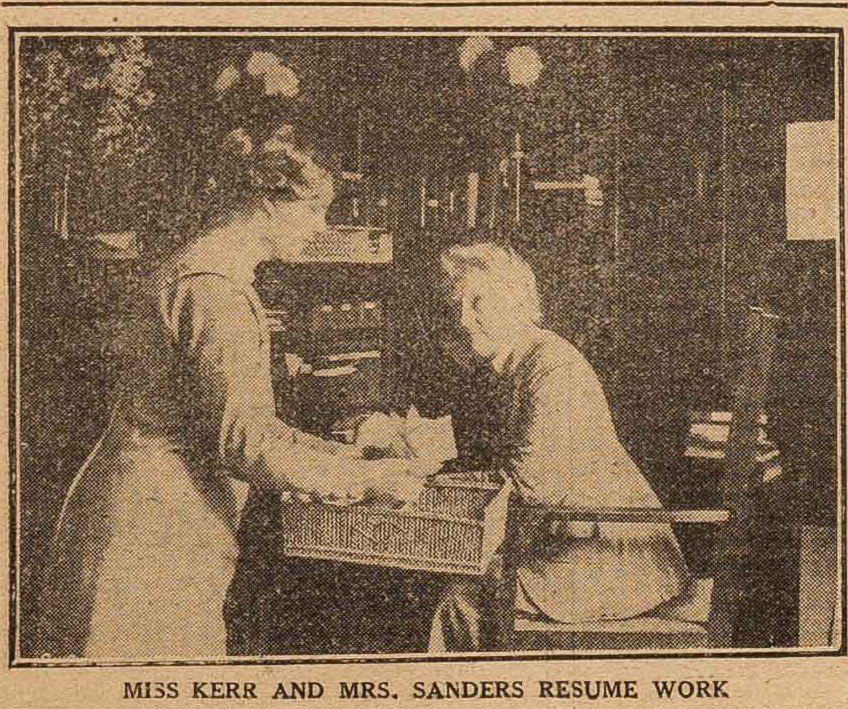
Harriet Kerr and Sanders at the offices of the Women's Social and Political Union (WSPU), from The Suffragette, 3 October 1913

Sanders and her husband were longstanding members of the Fabian Society and the West London Ethical Society (part of the Union of Ethical Societies, now Humanists UK). During the 1920s Beatrice served as chair of the Fabian Women's Group. For a period when her husband was working in Geneva, she became an organiser in the Swiss women's movement.

Beatrice Sanders died on 29 November 1932 at the age of 58.
