= Flora Drummond =

British suffragette

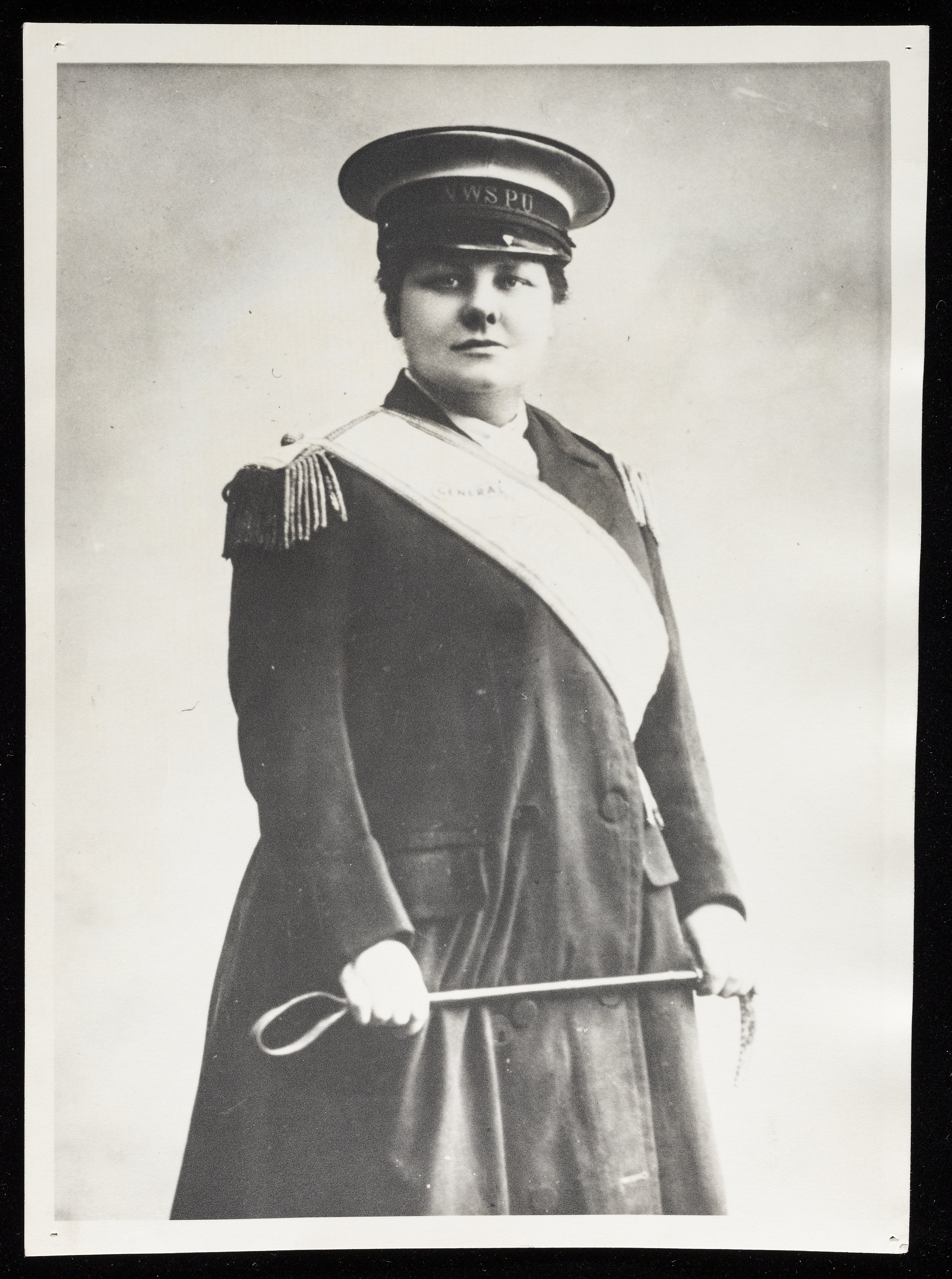
- Drummond in her Generals' uniform and WSPU sash
- Born: Flora McKinnon Gibson; 4 August 1878; Manchester, England
- Died: 17 January 1949 (aged 70); Carradale, Argyll, Scotland
- Other name: "The General"
- Known for: Daring stunts

Flora McKinnon Drummond (née Gibson; 4 August 1878 – 17 January 1949) was a Scottish suffragette. Nicknamed 'The General' for her habit of leading women's rights marches wearing a military style uniform 'with an officers cap and epaulettes' and riding on a large horse, Drummond was an organiser for the Women's Social and Political Union (WSPU) and was arrested nine times for her activism in the women's suffrage movement. Drummond's main political activity was organising and leading rallies, marches and demonstrations. She was an accomplished orator and had a reputation for being able to put down hecklers with ease.

== Early life ==
Flora McKinnon Gibson was born on 4 August 1878 in Manchester to Sarah (née Cook) and Francis Gibson. Her father was a tailor and whilst Flora was still a small child the family moved to Pirnmill on the Isle of Arran, where her mother had her roots. On leaving high-school at the age of fourteen Flora moved to Glasgow to take a business training course at a civil service school where she passed the qualifications to become a post-mistress but standing at 5 feet 1 inch (1.55 m) was refused a post as she did not meet the newly introduced minimum 5 feet 2 inches (1.57 m) height requirement.

Although she went on to gain a Society of Arts qualification in shorthand and typing she still carried a resentment about the discrimination which meant that women, because of their smaller average height, were prevented from being postmistresses. After her marriage to Joseph Drummond she moved back to the town of her birth and along with her husband was active in the Fabian Society and the Independent Labour Party. Drummond became the main earner when her husband lost his job. She was a manager at the British Oliver Typewriter Factory.

== Political activism ==
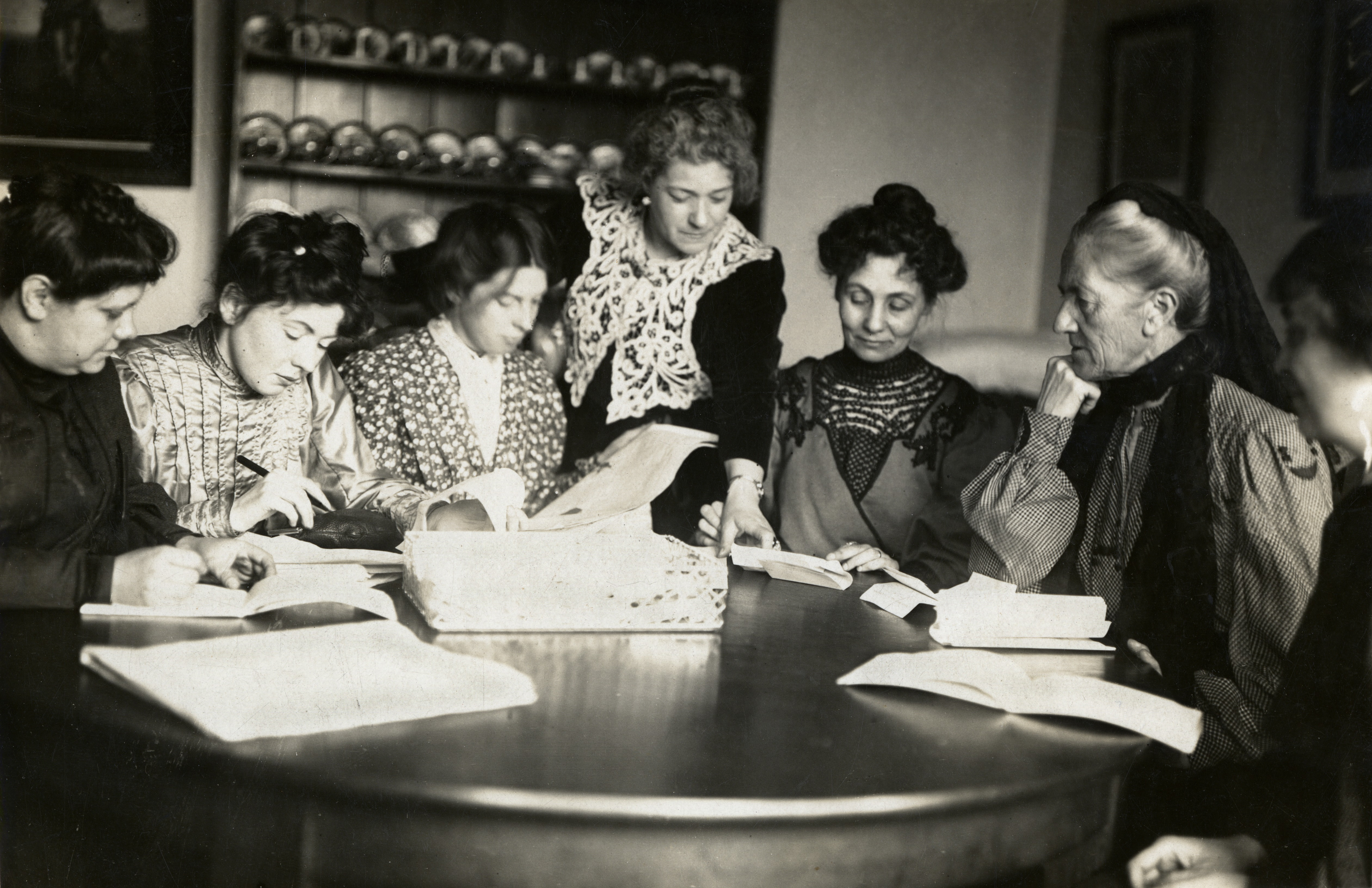
Flora Drummond with Christabel Pankhurst, Annie Kenney, (unknown), Emmeline Pankhurst, Charlotte Despard and (unknown), 1906–1907

Flora Drummond joined the WSPU in 1906. Following a Liberal Party election meeting at the Free Trade Hall in Manchester Christabel Pankhurst and Annie Kenney were imprisoned for pressing the candidate, Winston Churchill, to answer the question 'If you are elected, will you do your best to make Women's Suffrage a government measure?'. When the two women were released the WSPU held a celebratory rally in Manchester which Flora, who had witnessed their arrests, attended and was persuaded to join the movement. Shortly afterwards Flora moved to London and by the start of 19067 had served her first term in Holloway after being arrested inside the House of Commons. Drummond and other released prisoners were greeted by Christabel Pankhurst and taken to Anderton Hotel for breakfast. The group was joined by Mrs Charlotte Despard, who oversaw proceedings, described it as "a joyful occasion". A resolution to welcome the women was debated, and Drummond made a speech, stating that fourteen days for what she did was not a great punishment. According to the account in the Sheffield Daily Telegraph, she declared she had "the blood of the Clan Drummond" in her. Describing the journey to Holloway in a Black Maria, Drummond recounted hearing the voice of fellow suffragette Ann Fraser saying "Oh Bonnie Scotland, what I am suffering for you now."

Flora was known for her daring and headline-grabbing stunts, including in 1906 slipping inside the open door of 10 Downing Street whilst her companion Irene Miller was being arrested for knocking on the door. In 1908 Drummond and Helen Craggs were campaigning successfully against Churchill again. That year, Flora also became a paid organiser at the WSPU headquarters and hired a boat so that she could approach the Palace of Westminster from the River Thames to harangue the members of parliament sitting on the riverside terrace.

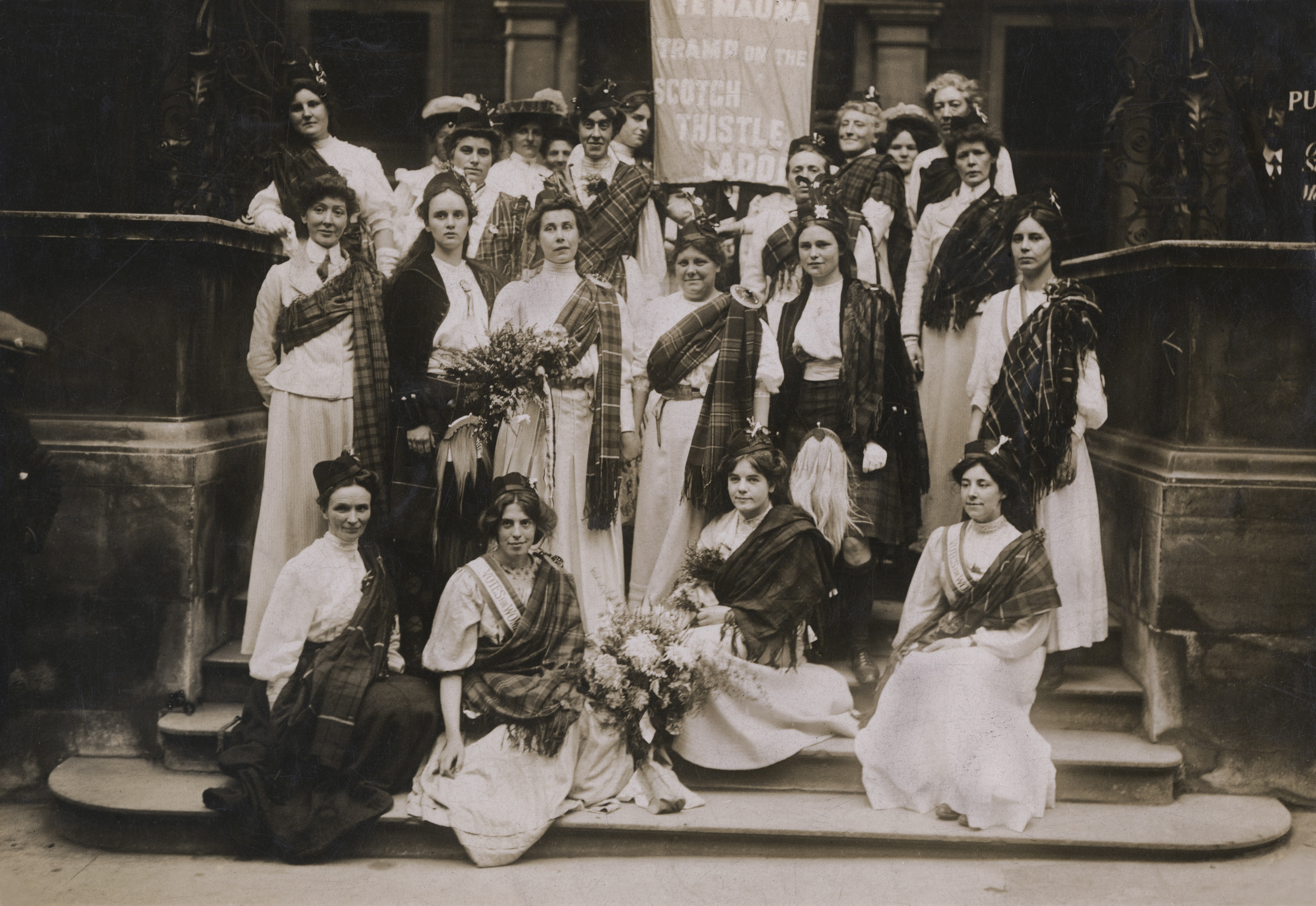
Flora Drummond in centre with suffragettes in tartan sashes: "Ye Mauna Tramp on the Scotch Thistle Laddie"

When Mary Phillips, who had worked in Glasgow WSPU, was released from prison after serving the longest (3-month) sentence she was welcomed by Flora Drummond, with bagpipes and other suffragettes who posed in tartan for a picture under the slogan "Ye Mauna Tramp on the Scotch Thistle Laddie". The Scottish suffragettes present compared their struggle to the campaign of William Wallace. Drummond also welcomed Catherine Corbett and others released from hunger strike at Dundee Gaol after riot at Winston Churchill's meeting in Dundee.

Flora Drummond was a key organiser of the Trafalgar Square rally in October 1908 which led to a three-month term in Holloway along with Christabel and Emmeline Pankhurst for "incitement to rush the House of Commons". The women had been given the option of being bound over to keep the peace for twelve months instead of a custodial sentence but all three opted for Holloway. Flora was in the first trimester of pregnancy when she was imprisoned and after fainting and being taken to the hospital wing she was granted early release on the grounds of ill-health. As Drummond was leaving the prison Emmeline Pankhurst broke the "silence rule" which forbade the suffragette prisoners from speaking to each other and called out 'I am glad because now you will be able to carry on the work'.

Drummond had been given a Hunger Strike Medal 'for Valour' by WSPU, after 9 imprisonments and a number of hunger strikes.

In October 1909, Drummond was the organiser of the first militant procession in Edinburgh as a response to a critical comment from the WSPU leadership in their newsletter Votes for Women which said 'Beautiful, haughty, dignified, stern Edinburgh, with your cautious steadfast people, you have not yet woken up to take part in our militant methods.' The theme of the march was 'have done and can do and will do' and featured women carrying banners and playing bagpipes dressed either in their working clothes or as female historical Scottish figures. Tens of thousands turned out on to the streets of Edinburgh to watch the parade and the event was considered by the Edinburgh Evening Dispatch to have been a success.

In 1913 Drummond and Annie Kenney arranged for WSPU representatives to speak with leading politicians David Lloyd George and Sir Edward Grey. The meeting had been with the proviso that these were working-class women representing their class. They explained the pay and working conditions that they suffered and their hope that a vote would enable women to challenge the status quo in a democratic manner. Alice Hawkins from Leicester explained how her fellow male workers could choose a man to represent them whilst the women were left unrepresented.

Drummond was leader of the WSPU Cycling Scouts, setting out to the country from the capital with women's suffrage message.

In May 1914 Drummond and Norah Dacre Fox (later known as Norah Elam) besieged the homes of Edward Carson and Lord Lansdowne, both prominent Ulster Unionist MPs who had been directly inciting militancy in Ulster against the Home Rule Bill then going through Parliament. Drummond and Dacre Fox had both been issued with summonses to appear before magistrates for 'making inciting speeches' and encouraging women to militancy. Their response to journalists who interviewed them was that they thought they should take refuge with Carson and Lansdowne who had also been making speeches and encouraging militancy in Ireland, but who appeared to be safe from interference from the authorities for doing so. Later the same day both women appeared before a magistrate, were sentenced to imprisonment and taken to Holloway where they immediately commenced hunger and thirst strikes and endured a period of force feeding.

Drummond presided over a meeting in Saint Andrew's Halls in November 1916. The meeting had been arranged to welcome French women munition workers. Although the workers had been delayed, the meeting continued without them. Drummond told the audience that she and others had travelled to Paris and, according to the Glasgow Herald report of the meeting, had received "many hints" in munitions work.

== Retirement from direct action ==
Drummond's terms in prison, including several hunger strikes took a physical toll on her and in 1914 she spent some time on the Isle of Arran to recover her health. After her return to London on the outbreak of the First World War she concentrated her efforts on public speaking and administration rather than direct action; thus avoiding further arrest. Drummond supported the government during the war; for example pleading for volunteers in Trafalgar Square in 1915 'We have given up our fight for the vote...today is the time for sacrifices'. In 1917, along with Lloyd George, she reviewed female war workers in Birkenhead.

She remained prominent within the movement and in 1928 she was a pall-bearer at the funeral of Emmeline Pankhurst.

Her politics moved away from the labour socialism of her youth, as she travelled around the country persuading workers not to strike, and in 1926 Drummond again led a parade, the Great Prosperity March against the unrest predating the General Strike. In the 1930s Drummond formed the Women's Guild of Empire, a right-wing league opposed to communism and fascism. Her one-time militant partner Norah Elam, who had become a leading member of Mosley's British Union of Fascists wrote a scathing attack of the Guild calling it an anti-fascist circus and describing her former friend as an 'extinct volcano'.

Drummond became Chairman of the Six Point Group in 1931, replacing Lady Rhondda. It was stated in the Glasgow Herald of 27th February 1931 that Drummond had been responsible for that the newspaper described as "the latest triumph of the women's movement" due to her activities in Geneva.

Flora and Joseph Drummond divorced in 1922 and later that year she married a cousin, Alan Simpson. Alan was killed during an air-raid in 1944. Five years previously, Drummond had written a series of articles about her life (entitled 'My campaigning days') for The Aberdeen People's Journal.

Flora returned to Arran but was denied permission to build a cottage and so lived in a makeshift corrugated iron roofed shed, until her neighbours took her in when she became ill. She died in Carradale on 17 January 1949, following a stroke at the age of 70.

== Portrait of Drummond by Flora Lion ==
In 1936, Drummond was presented with her own portrait, which had been commissioned by fellow former suffragettes. The portrait hangs in the National Galleries of Scotland, and is described on the Galleries' website as showing Drummond as follows:"She wears a pendant and a ribbon in the suffragette colours of green, white and violet, symbolising hope, purity and dignity — and spelling out the initial letters of Give Women Votes."

== Posthumous recognition ==
In 2001 a headstone was placed for the 'Suffragette General' on her grave in Kintyre. Her name and picture (and those of 58 other women's suffrage supporters) are on the plinth of the statue of Millicent Fawcett in Parliament Square, London, unveiled in 2018.

== See also ==
- List of suffragists and suffragettes
- Gude Cause
