= Eates =

Eates is a surname. Notable people with the surname include:

- Louise Eates (1877–1944), British suffragette and women's education activist
- Margot Eates (1913–1994), British art historian and curator
