= 105 Barking Road =

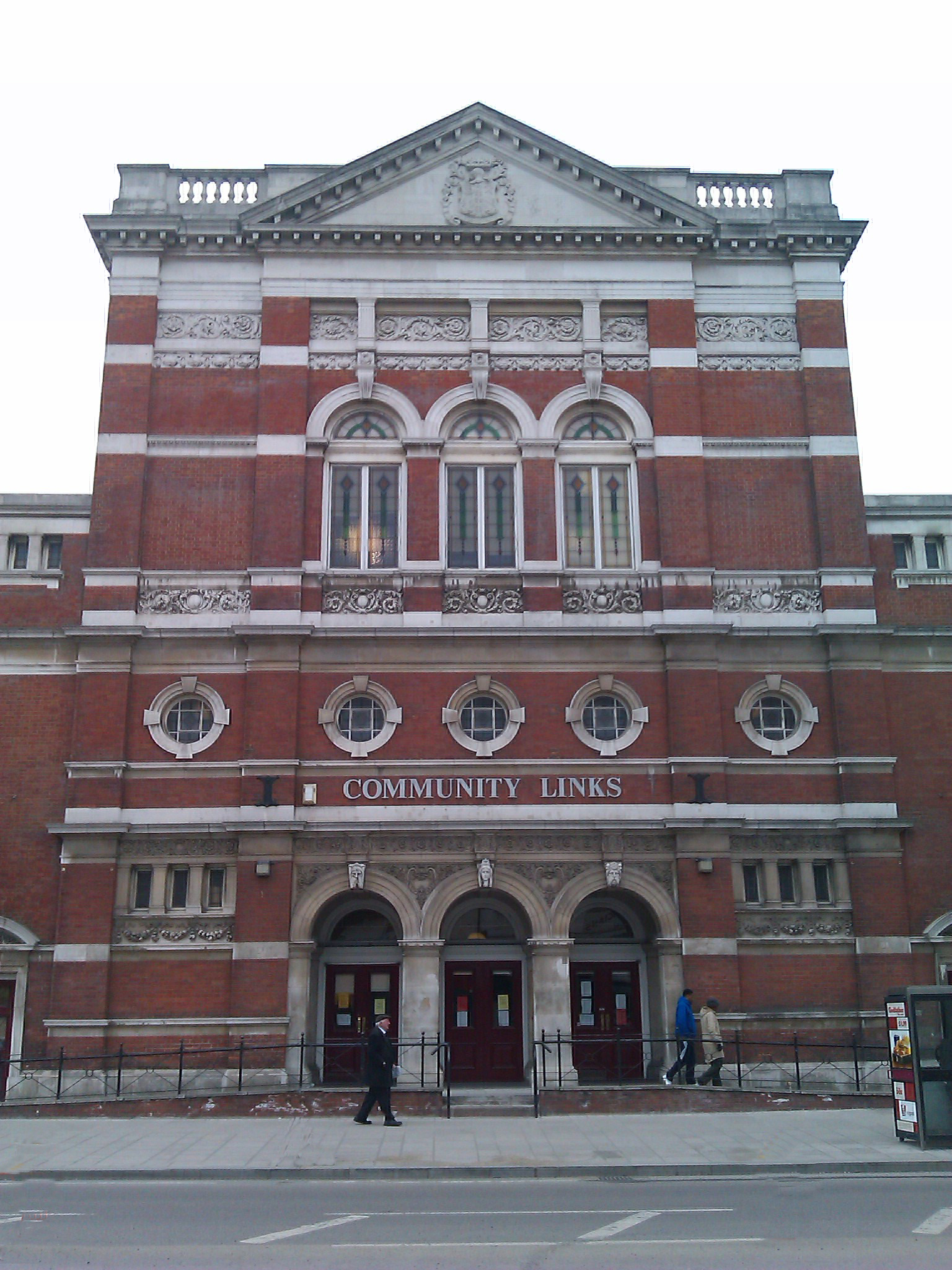
- Front Entrance of 105 Barking Road, Canning Town

- Shown in Newham
- 51°31′03″N 0°00′41″E
- Location: Canning Town

History
- Built: 1894

Site notes
- Architect: Lewis Angell
- Architectural style: Italianate style

Listed Building – Grade II
- Designated: 12 September 2011
- Reference no.: 1402042

105 Barking Road is a former public hall in Canning Town, in the London Borough of Newham, in England. The building is situated in the ward of Canning Town South, on the north of Barking Road, to the northeast of Canning Town station. 105 Barking Road is a classic example of a Victorian town hall with links to East London's suffragette and labour movements during the late nineteenth and early twentieth centuries. The building is a Grade II listed building.

Notable British activists including Sylvia Pankhurst, Will Thorne and James Keir Hardie all spoke here. Today, the building is the headquarters of the social action charity Community Links.

== History ==
=== Construction ===
The building was designed by the British architect Lewis Angell (who also designed Stratford Old Town Hall in conjunction with John Giles) in the Italianate style, and was built between 1892 and 1894.

=== Connections with East End suffragette and labour movements ===
The public hall is associated with various prominent socialists and suffragettes in the United Kingdom, including Sylvia Pankhurst, Eleanor Marx, Keir Hardie, Daisy Parsons and Bertrand Russell who all spoke here. It also has a connection with the trade unionist Will Thorne who addressed a meeting of his fellow workers at the site of the public hall in 1889:

"The way you have been treated in your work for many years is scandalous, brutal and inhuman. I pledge my word that, if you will stand firm and don't waver, within six months we will claim and win the eight-hour day, a six-day week and the abolition of the present slave-driving methods in vogue not only at the Beckton Gas Works, but all over the country."

Following the speech, he established the National Union of Gasworkers and General Labourers (a forerunner to GMB, now one of the three biggest trade unions in the UK). By late 1889 the Union had 20,000 members and its success prepared the ground for the London Dock Strike of 1889, and the rapid growth of unionism in East London. Thorne was elected as general secretary of the Union on the same year, to a seat on West Ham town council in 1891, the borough's mayor in 1917–18, and MP for West Ham South in 1906, a seat he held for 12 years.

Another local public figure connected with the hall is Daisy Parsons, a leading suffragette and West Ham's first female mayor. In 1914, Parsons (along with Sylvia Pankhurst and the future leader of the Labour Party, George Lansbury) held a meeting at Canning Town Public Hall to demand a minimum wage for women of 5s a day or £1 a week. In the following year, Parsons also gave an impassioned speech at the Woman's Suffrage and Labour Meeting held at the hall, led by Sylvia Pankhurst.

When the first London branch of the Women's Social and Political Union (WSPU) was formed in Canning Town by Minnie Baldock and Annie Kenney in 1906 (with Adelaide Knight as Secretary), several meetings were held at Canning Town Public Hall. The East London Federation of Suffragettes continued to hold meetings at the hall after their split from the WSPU.

=== A centre for the community ===
The building has also served as a relief centre for the local community on several occasions. On 19 January 1917, a factory of the chemical firm Brunner, Mond & Co in Silvertown exploded, killing 69 people on the spot, seriously injuring 98 others, 4 of whom later died, with a further 1,000 people who sustained minor injuries. The Silvertown explosion caused massive destruction in the borough, around 70,000 homes were damaged, displacing a large number of residents. The public hall opened its doors and provided food, shelters, and clothes to those of who had lost their home. In February 1953, the Thames flooded the area of Canning Town and Custom House, it's known as North Sea Flood of 1953. An estimated 1,500 homes were damaged; 105 Barking Road once again provided temporary accommodation for those affected.

Apart from hosting political events and delivering humanitarian aid, the public hall has also held a wide variety of community events. Newham Council's records show that 105 Barking Road was often to provide tea and entertainment for children selected from "the poorest streets".

When East Ham and West Ham merged into London Borough of Newham in 1965, the public hall at 105 Barking Road became an Adult Education Institute. The building continued its educational role until 1989 when the local authority ruled it unsafe.

=== 1990-present ===
In 1990, local charity Community Links proposed to Newham Council that they would take over the building and bring it back into community use at no cost to the local authority. In return, the Council would lease 105 Barking Road to Community Links on a peppercorn lease. Following detailed negotiations, the Council agreed to this proposal in Spring 1991. Community Links began to raise fund to restore and revive the building and convert it to a multi-purpose community centre, and the plan was designed by British architect Richard Ellis. The construction work began with a 'Topping Out' ceremony attended by Prince Charles on 2 December 1992. 128 companies provided free or substantially discounted materials, equipment, or professional services, and many community partners and individuals also made cash donations during the renovation. The total cost of the renovation project would have cost £1.5 million. However, with assistance pouring in from local community, Community Links only paid a little over £500,000 for the entire project. All the rest was contributed in kind. Community Links reopened the building with 7 days of celebration in October 1993, and it has been the home of the charity ever since.

== Design ==
The hall's purpose was to provide a public meeting space and to administer council business in the southern part of the borough, where the population had expanded rapidly in the late nineteenth century. The site cost £2,400 (including land for the library) and construction cost £20,000. The library next door was constructed as part of the same development; the philanthropist John Passmore Edwards donated the first thousand books to the library's collection.

It was at first intended to include public baths on the ground floor of the hall, with a galleried assembly hall on the first floor, but this aspiration was abandoned in 1891 on the grounds of cost. Instead, a second public hall-cum-police court and offices were provided. The new hall and library were some of the first public buildings in the borough to be lit by electricity, generated by gas engines on site. These were used until 1898 when the power generating station at Abbey Mills came into operation.

The key architectural features of the building include a mosaic terrazzo floor and stained glass windows. The exterior of the hall also retains an impressive Italianate façade of red brick, ornamented with decorative Portland stone friezes and panels. Historic England states that the building has many architectural assets, including its "original stairs, doorcases and coloured glass windows and a vast first floor auditorium with surviving plasterwork ceiling, proscenium, and light fittings".

Inside, the ground floor has an entrance lobby (with the mosaic terrazzo floor) with a foundation plaque, recording the names of councillors who oversaw the hall's construction. Two decorative cast-iron, open-well staircases lead from the main lobby to the mezzanine landing, the latter lit by stained glass windows in Art-Deco designs. A perpendicular corridor leading off from the landing gives access to the Sylvia Pankhurst Room and James Keir Hardie Room, used for training workshops and community events.

At the end of the corridor is the Neighbours Hall. The hall's principal decoration is its coffered ceiling, which has not been affected by the partial subdivision of the hall in the 1990s. Two of the original chandeliers, vast metal and frosted glass discs, remain in-situ. The sprung floor of the original stage also remains, although the stage arch has been partitioned.

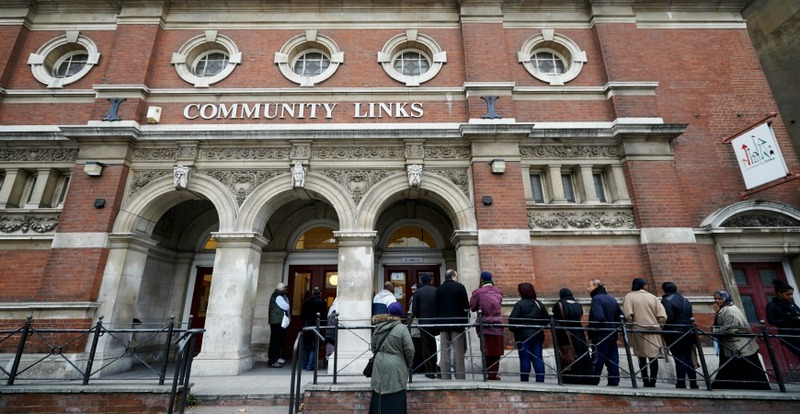
Queue for Form Filling Session at 105 Barking Road

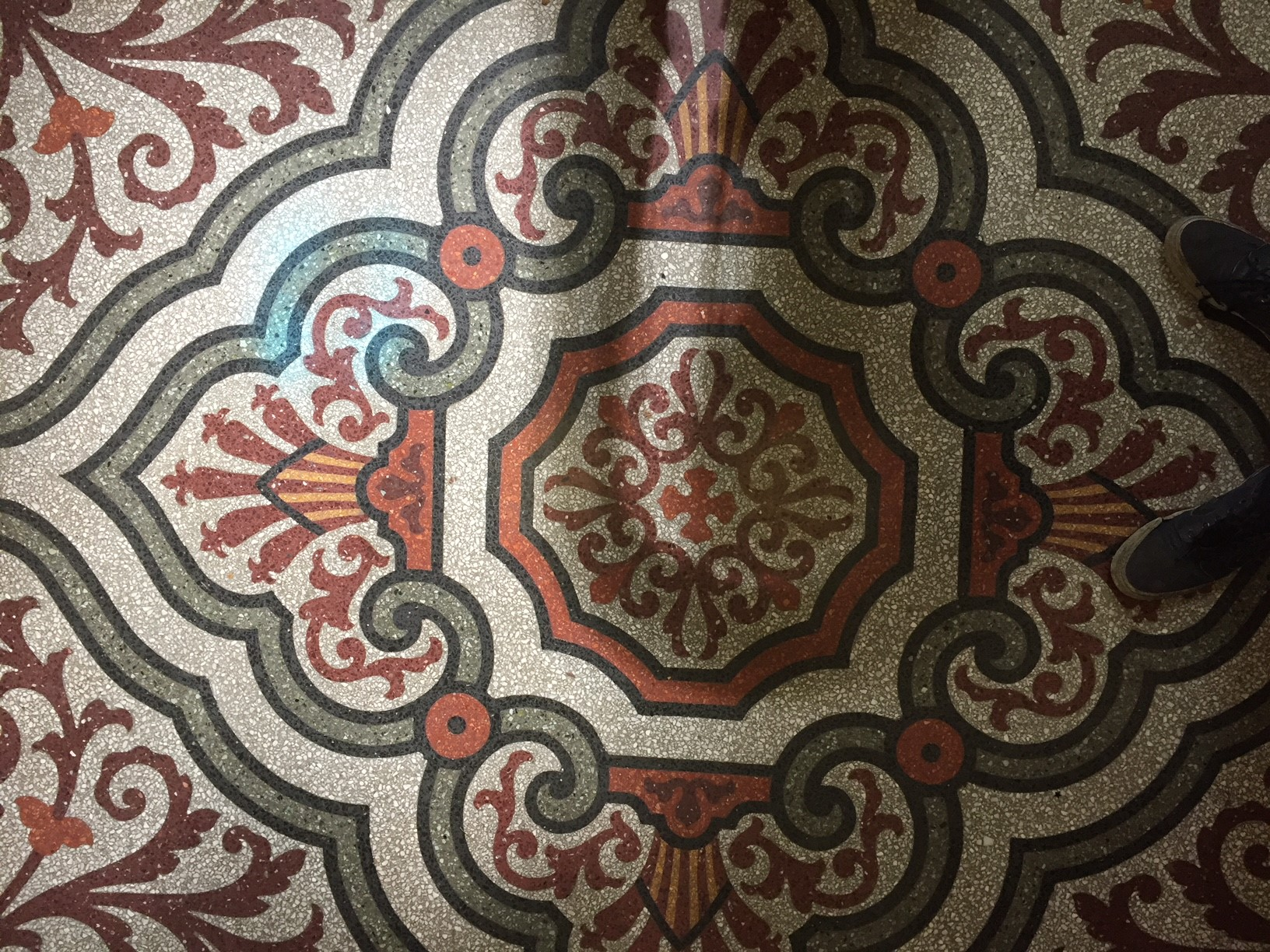
Mosaic Terrazzo Floor at 105 Barking Road

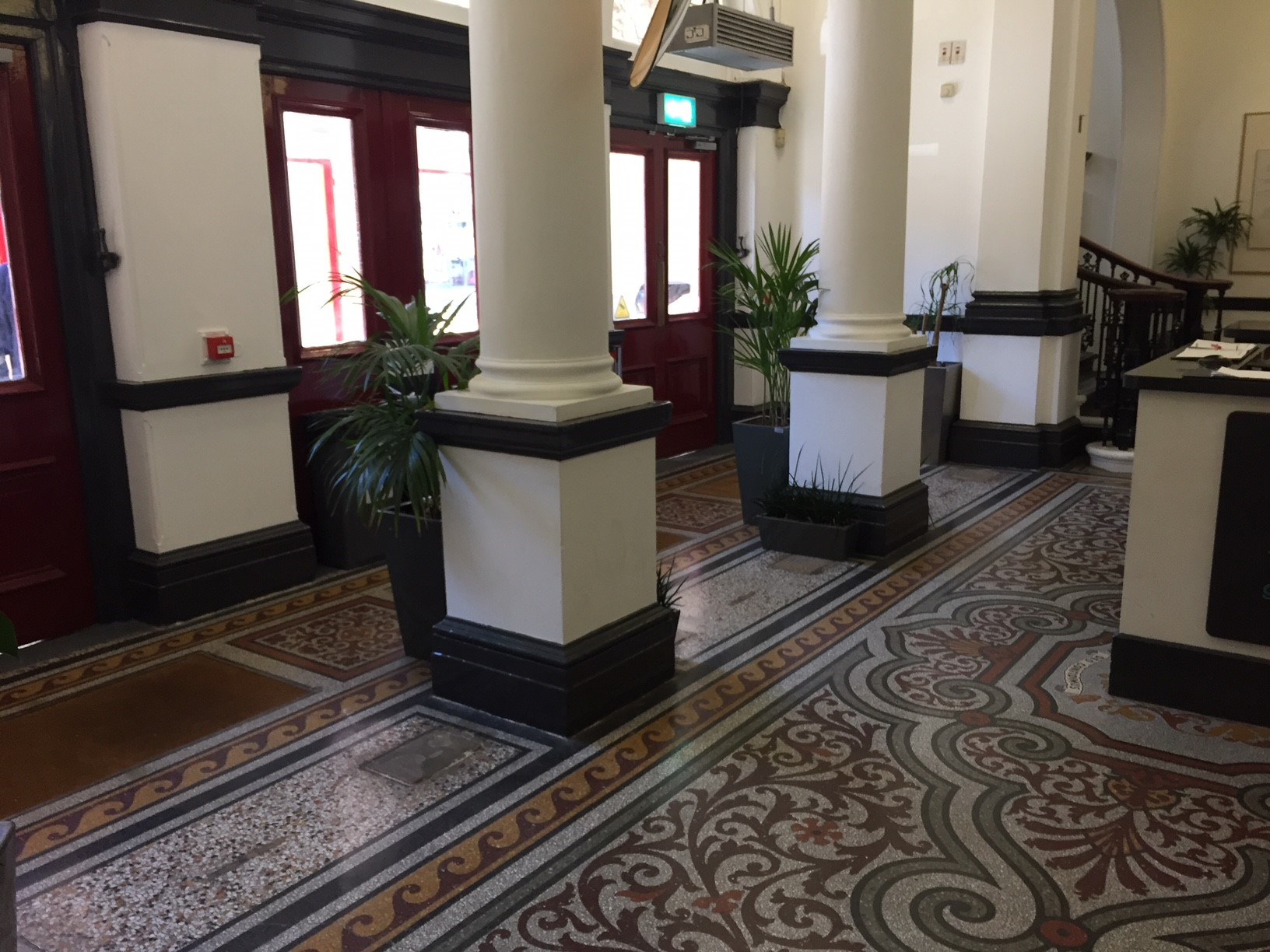
Reception at 105 Barking Road

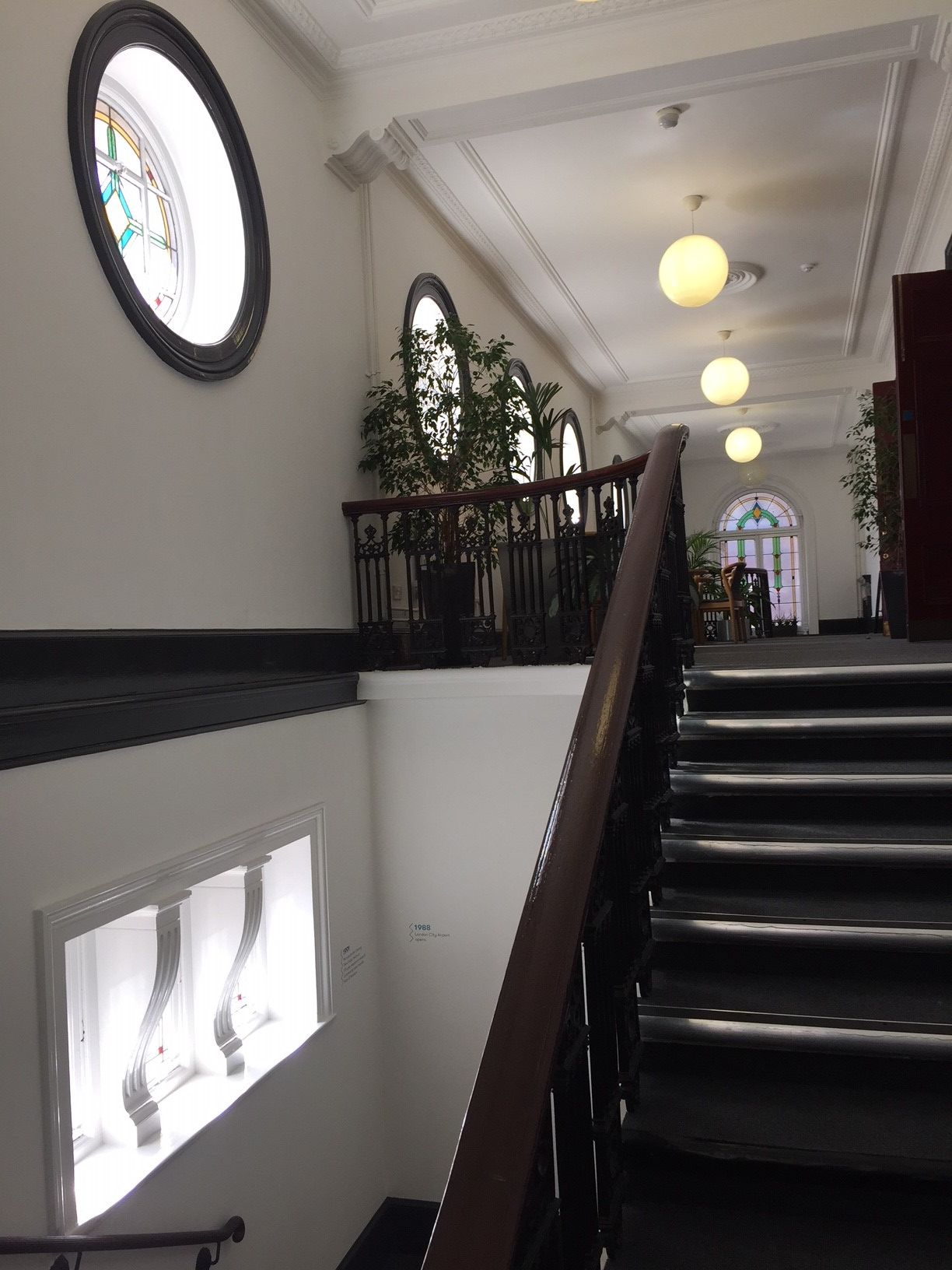
Crossover at 105 Barking Road

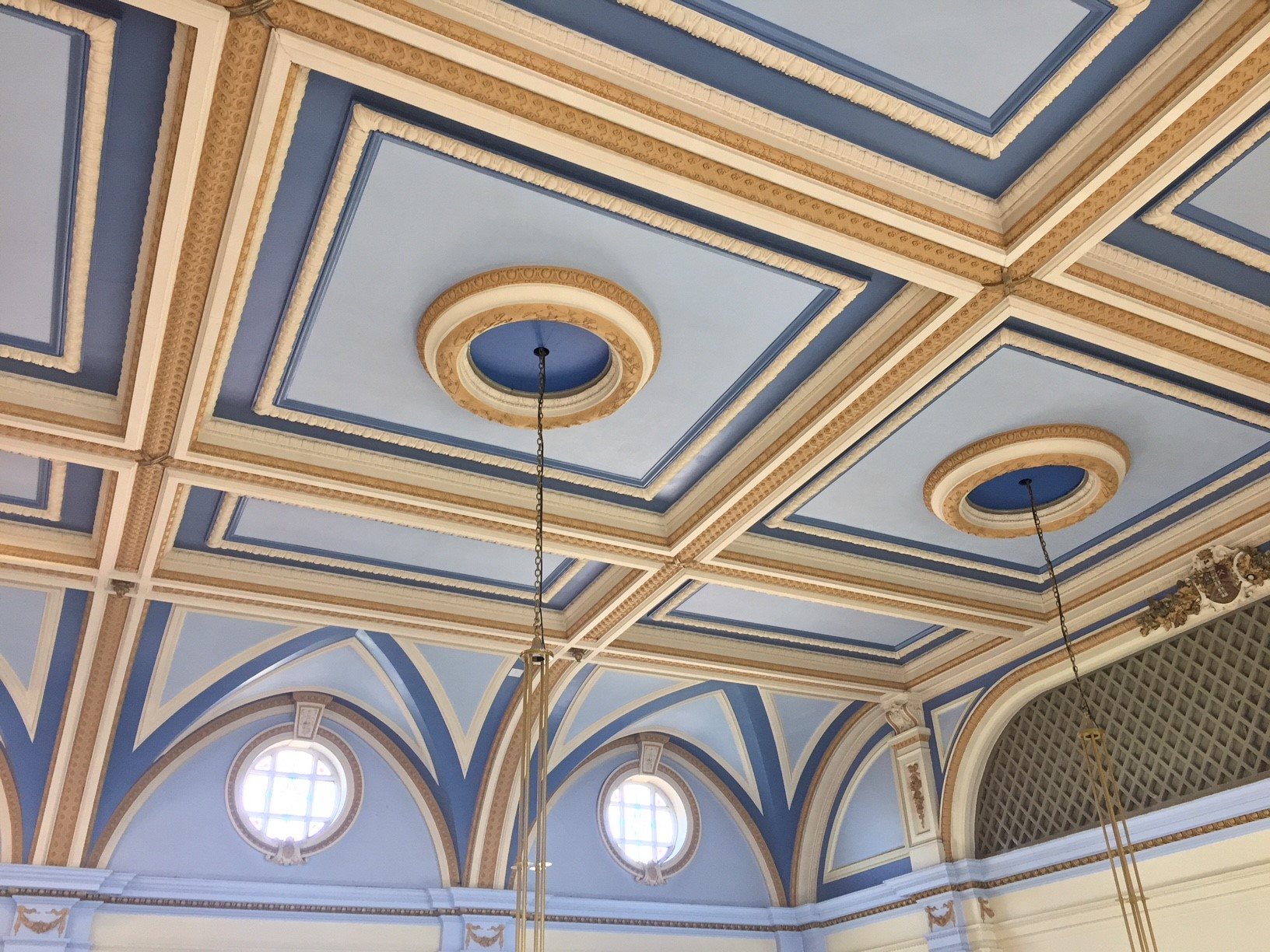
Ceiling in Neighbour's Hall

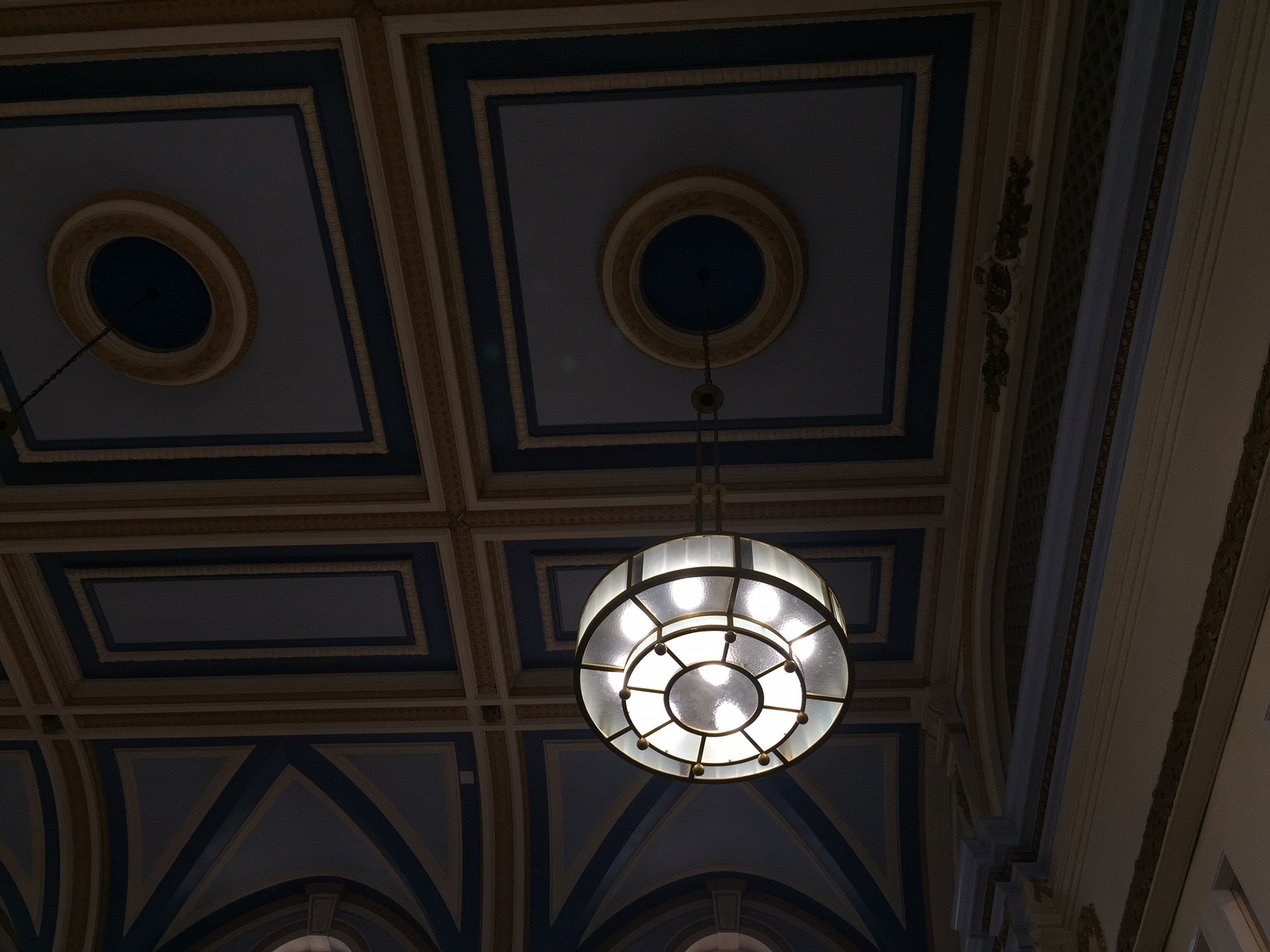
Chandelier in Neighbour's Hall
