= Jane Sbarborough =

British suffragette

- Born: 1842; Canada East
- Died: 1925
- Organization: Women's Social and Political Union
- Known for: British suffragette activism
- Spouse(s): Fortuno Sbarborough, Italian shipping agent

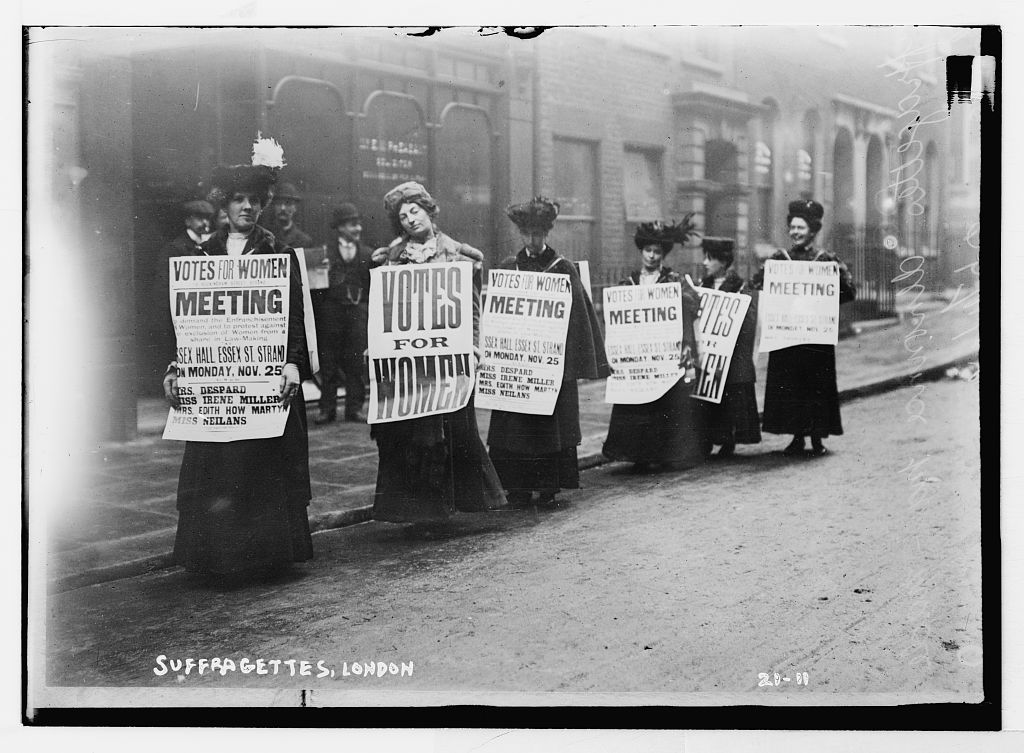
Suffragettes in London

Jane Sbarborough also known as Sbarabara (1842 — 1925), was born in Canada East but is recognized as a British suffragette. She, along with Annie Kenney and Adelaide Knight, was part of the "Canning Town Three", as dubbed by the press. Sbarborough was an early member of the first East End London branch of the Women's Social and Political Union.

== Life and activism ==
Jane Sbarborough was born in Quebec in 1842. She worked in needlework and married an Italian shipper Fortunato Sbarborough, who lived in the East End of London, which was known for its poor conditions. She was one of the early members, joining Annie Kenney and Minnie Baldock in the first London branch (in Canning Town) of the then Manchester based Women's Social and Political Union in 1906, holding meetings at Canning Town Public Hall.

Sbarborough, already in her 60s, was with a crowd of around 150 women who rushed the Chancellor of the Exchequer H.H. Asquith's home in June 1906, after he would not accept a delegation including Annie Kenney, who was arrested. Jane had seen the chancellor's servants and had asked why they were involved cheering the arrests. In her own hearing for breach of the peace later, she was quoted as speaking out about the need for the right to vote for both women and men living in poverty in the East End to alter the deprivation endured under the rule of men only in politics up to that date.

She was sentenced to six weeks in Holloway Prison joining Theresa Billington. Jane was in contact with the other prisoners for women's suffrage with signals and whispers but found the prison cell to herself as a peaceful place.

The Canning Town group minutes noted a large crowd greeted the prisoners' release at Hyde Park and speeches were given including by Christabel Pankhurst.

In 1907 Minnie Baldock reported to the group on her visit to Jane Sbarborough in Holloway Prison when she heard about signalling between suffragettes, imprisoned at the same time, but not allowed to talk to each other. Baldock was also at the prison gate with Christabel Pankhurst to support those released to have a celebratory hotel breakfast. Sbarborough also spoke with Baldock in June 1907 at a Knightsbridge home event at the request of Louise Eates, Kensington WSPU and may have joined Baldock in August at a home in Kensington with Emmeline Pankhurst which Sara Jessie Stephenson explained in her pamphlet No Other Way

"to make the rich and idle women realise the difficulties that drive poor women to demand the vote".

In January 1914, the main Suffragette organisation in the East End, the Women’s Social and Political Union (WSPU) split in half. The eastern part re-established itself as the East London Federation of the Suffragettes (ELFS), with its own newspaper, The Women’s Dreadnaught.

Objects and archive materials on display include a rare ‘Ealontoys’ teddy bear made in the toy factory started by the ELFS just behind Roman Road; and the handwritten diary of suffragette Gertrude Setchfield which describes her trips to the East End in 1914 to attend ELFS rallies, on loan from the LSE Women’s Library.

https://romanroadlondon.com/bow-suffragettes-lost-stories/

== Death ==
Sbarborough passed in 1925, just as (Jane Sbarabara) did in Wandsworth, London.

== See also ==
- History of feminism
- List of suffragists and suffragettes
- Suffragette
- Women's suffrage in the United Kingdom
