= Hope Squire =

British composer, pianist

Evelyn Hope Squire Merrick (1878–1936) was a British composer, pianist, and political activist who supported women's suffrage, vegetarianism, Esperanto, and new music. She opposed England’s participation in World War I. She published and performed under the names Hope Squire and Hope Merrick.

== Biography ==
Squire was born in Southport to engineer and poet John Barret Squire and his wife. She married composer Frank Merrick in 1911.

Squire studied piano with Henry Gadsby, Tobias Matthay, and Ernst von Dohnanyi. She taught piano and presented recitals at London’s Steinway Hall and other venues. Together, she and Merrick gave recitals for two pianos. They would sometimes play new compositions without telling the audience the composer’s name. At one of these recitals in 1915, they performed a duet version of Claude Debussy’s La Mer.

Merrick was an active member of the Manchester Men's League for Women's Suffrage. Squire sewed a banner for the group in 1914.

Merrick was imprisoned from May 1917 to April 1919 for opposing England’s involvement in World War I and becoming a conscientious objector. While he was in prison, Squire taught his pupils at the Royal Manchester College of Music, in addition to her own private pupils.

Squire was active in several organizations: the Independent Labour Party (ILP), the No Conscription Fellowship (NCF), the United Suffragists, the Women’s Freedom League (WFL), and the Women’s Social and Political Union (WSPU). She socialized and worked with Margaret Ashton, Annie Brickhill, Lila and Fenner Brockway, Dame Clara Butt, Lillian Forester, Amy Herford, Emmeline Pethick Lawrence, Crewe Lewis, Annot Robinson, Oscar and Thekla Rothschild, Phillis and J. Allen Skinner, Annie Somers, and May Unwin.

Hope Squire and Frank Merrick’s papers are archived at the University of Bristol Archives. Squire’s music was published by Boosey & Co., Elkin & Co., Marriott, and Stainer & Bell.

== Works ==
Her compositions include:

=== Piano ===
- Tom Bowling (for two pianos)
- Variations on Black Eyed Susan

=== Vocal ===
- Four Songs of Hiawatha’s Childhood (text by Henry Wadsworth Longfellow)
- “Imogen” (text by Henry Newbolt)
- “Merry Merry Lark” (text by Charles Kingsley)
- “Messmates” (text by Henry Newbolt)
- “My Valentine” (text by L. Barret)
- “Skylark” (text by L. Barret)
- “The Boy and the Rosebud” (text by Johann Wolfgang von Goethe)
- “Two Red Indian Love Songs” (text by Henry Wadsworth Longfellow)
- Two Songs from Hiawatha (text by Henry Wadsworth Longfellow)
- “When I am Dead, My Dearest” (text by Christina Rossetti)
- “Widow Bird Sate Mourning” (text by Percy Bysshe Shelley)

== See also ==
- List of peace activists
