= Winifred Langton =

British communist and internationalist activist (1909–2003)

- Born: Winifred Knight; 20 May 1909; London, England
- Died: 7 March 2003 (aged 93)
- Education: Bostal Lane School, Kingswarren School
- Occupations: communist, internationalist and activist
- Organization(s): Young Communist League, Communist Party of Great Britain, Greenham Common Women's Peace Camp
- Children: 2
- Mother: Adelaide Knight

Winifred "Win" Langton (20 May 1909 – 7 March 2003) was a British communist, internationalist and activist.

== Family ==
Langton was born in 1909 in Plaistow, East London, as one of six children. In the 1902 smallpox epidemic three of her elder siblings had died.

Her mother was Adelaide Knight (1871–1950), a working class suffragette with a physical disability, member of the Women's Social and Political Union (WSPU) and founder member of the Communist Party of Great Britain (CPGB). Her father was Donald Adolphus Brown (1874–1949), the son of a Guyanese naval officer and an English mother. He worked as foreman at the Royal Arsenal in Woolwich. He took his wife's surname and became known as Donald Knight. She later wrote a book about her parents called Courage and reflected that she learned to fight from her mother and to care from her father.

Langton was educated at Bostal Lane School in Abbey Wood then won a scholarship to Kingswarren School in Bexleyheath. She left Kingswarren School aged 16 as she encountered discrimination and "I was being educated to become a snob."

== Activism ==
Langton was an activist from an early age and a member of the Young Communist League and CPGB. In the 1920s she started selling the CPGB newspaper Workers Weekly in Woolwich, then marched in 1925 with workers to HM Prison Wandsworth to protest at the imprisonment of the communist leaders who were held there. She next became a cycle messenger for trade union strike committees during the General Strike in 1926.

In 1936, Langton opposed Oswald Mosley, his Blackshirts and fascism at the Battle of Cable Street. That same year, when the Jarrow March arrived in London, Langton took food and bathed the men’s blistered feet.

During World War II, Langton, her parents and children moved from Woolwich to the Isle of Sheppey, where she was employed as an orderly at a hospital, a cleaner and a motor mechanic. She also cared for her parents until their deaths in 1949 and 1950.

In the 1960s, Langton moved to Cumbria. In 1967, she founded a Hiroshima Day Vigil which took place annually at the Market Cross in Ulverston for over thirty years. In the 1970s and 1980s she visited the Soviet Union (USSR) and the German Democratic Republic. She kept a bust of Vladimir Lenin on her mantlepiece.

Langton was secretary of the South Cumbrian Medical Aid for Vietnam fund. In the 1980s, in recognition of her fundraising, she was invited to Vietnam for the opening of a British hospital, was awarded a medal and the Vietnamese ambassador Dang Nghien Bai stayed at her council house in Ulverston, Cumbria.

== Later life ==
Langton was amongst the "pensioners for peace" who demonstrated at Sellafield against the nuclear industry and joined the anti-nuclear missile protests at the Greenham Common Women's Peace Camp. She celebrated her 79th birthday whilst campaigning at Greenham Common.

She also campaigned against apartheid in South Africa and marched in front of a territorial army parade carrying a Boycott South African Goods banner.

In 1999, Langston was presented with a certificate of appreciation by Ulverston Town Council in honour of her work for the local community.

== Personal life ==
Langton was married three times. She firstly married in 1931 and had a daughter before the marriage ended in 1936. She remarried in 1937. In 1947 her second husband died. She married for a third time in 1948 and her third husband died in 1971.

== Death ==
Langton died in 2003. The local newspaper reported her death and commented that "she fought for almost every cause under the sun."
