= United Suffragists =

British suffragist organization (1914–1918)

The United Suffragists was a women's suffrage movement in the United Kingdom.

== History ==
The group was founded on 6 February 1914, by former members and supporters of the Women's Social and Political Union (WSPU). In contrast to the WSPU, it admitted men, and it also admitted non-militant suffragists. The organisation brought together activists from different strands of the suffrage movement, including socialist and non-militant campaigners, reflecting attempts to build wider cooperation between the women's suffrage and labour movements.

Founder members of the United Suffragists included Louisa Garrett Anderson, H. J. Gillespie, Gerald Gould, Barbara Ayrton-Gould, Agnes Harben, Bertha Brewster and Henry Devenish Harben, Bessie Lansbury, George Lansbury, Mary Neal, Emmeline Pethick Lawrence, Julia Scurr and John Scurr, Evelyn Sharp, and Edith Ayrton. Louise Eates and Lena Ashwell also became members in 1914, and Ellen Smith who was in the Fabian Society, like H. J. Gillespie, who was the United Suffragists treasurer. Maud Arncliffe Sennett became its first vice-president.

Louisa Garrett Anderson was in the Edinburgh branch, and another branch was in Liverpool, supported by Patricia Woodlock. Helen Crawfurd formed a branch in Glasgow in 1915. Labour Party members Annie Somers and Hope Squire were also active in the organisation, and Mary Phillips worked with them during 1915 and 1916, and continued to develop with the Suffragette Fellowship and Six Point Group. Lilian Hicks was a former WSPU militant activist who became secretary of the Hampstead branch.

The United Suffragists organisation adopted Votes for Women as its newspaper; as this was run by Pethick-Lawrence and had formerly been associated with the WSPU, with Evelyn Sharp as its main editor.

Unlike the WSPU, United Suffragists continued to campaign through World War I, and although its newspaper circulation dropped, the organisation itself gradually attracted more members from both former WPSU as well as from the National Union of Women's Suffrage Societies (NUWSS).

With the introduction of women's suffrage in 1918, the group dissolved itself, after holding a victory celebration in Caxton Hall, and also participating in the NUWSS celebrations, and discontinued its newspaper.
