= Julia Scurr =

British politician (1871–1927)

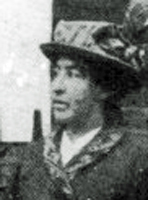
- Julia Scurr, 1914
- Born: Julia Sullivan; 17 February 1871; London, England
- Died: 10 April 1927 (aged 56)
- Occupation: Politician
- Spouse: John Scurr (m. 1900–1927)

Julia Scurr (née Sullivan; 17 February 1871 – 10 April 1927) was a British politician and suffragette.

== Early experience ==
Julia Sullivan was born to Irish parents on 17 February 1871 in Limehouse in the East End of London. She married John Scurr in 1900, who was an accountant, trade unionist and associate of George Lansbury. She had three children born over four years. She became a prominent activist for working women in the East End, and was the main organiser of a large demonstration against unemployment in 1905, following which she met the then Prime Minister, Arthur Balfour. In 1907, she was elected to the Poplar Board of Guardians, representing the Labour Party.

== Role in suffrage movement ==
An associate of Sylvia Pankhurst, Scurr joined her East London Federation of Suffragettes. She was one of the delegation of six women (Daisy Parsons, Jane Savoy, Jessie Payne, Mrs Bird and Mrs Watkins) from the East End who met with Prime Minister H. H. Asquith on 20 June 1914 following Pankhurst's hunger strike. This was just two weeks after her husband had made his fourth attempt to become an MP, unsuccessfully contesting Ipswich by-election.

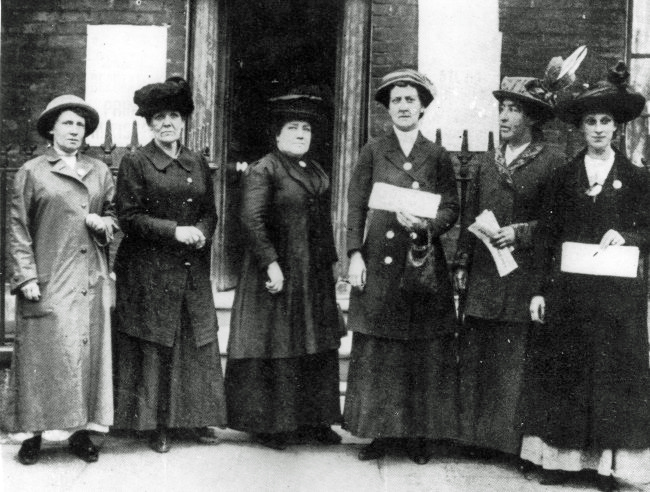
Scurr (2nd from right) in 1914 suffragettes deputation

Scurr's plea to the Prime Minister was for the demand for suffrage coming from East London working women (and men) living in poverty, who died young, and for the widows without support. She also asked about childcare, schooling and housing. Scurr said in reference to Mrs Pankhurst's hunger strike "We are here today to demand a vote for every woman over the age of twenty-one".

The Prime Minister's response included some positive remarks about 'no disposition in any quarter to be vindictive' but in return asking for women's militancy to be condemned by the delegation. Scurr said their organisation were not arsonists, but did not want to criticise others nor should they ignore the 'all sorts' of methods that men had used in the past.

Also in February 1914 she was a founder member of the United Suffragists. This became Scurr's primary area of activism, working alongside others such as Agnes Harben, and Emmeline Pethick-Lawrence, Scurr was elected as one of its vice-presidents. United Suffragists brought together women and men, militants and non-militants and took over publishing weekly Votes for Women. When (some) women were given the vote in 1918, under the Representation of the People Act 1918, the United Suffragists disbanded.

== Political career and later life ==
She opposed British involvement in the First World War, but served on a food control committee during the conflict. In 1919, she was elected to Poplar Borough Council, playing a leading role in the Poplar Rates Rebellion of 1921, and she served as Mayor of Poplar in 1923/4.

Scurr was elected to London County Council, representing Mile End, in 1925, but resigned early the following year. She died in April 1927.

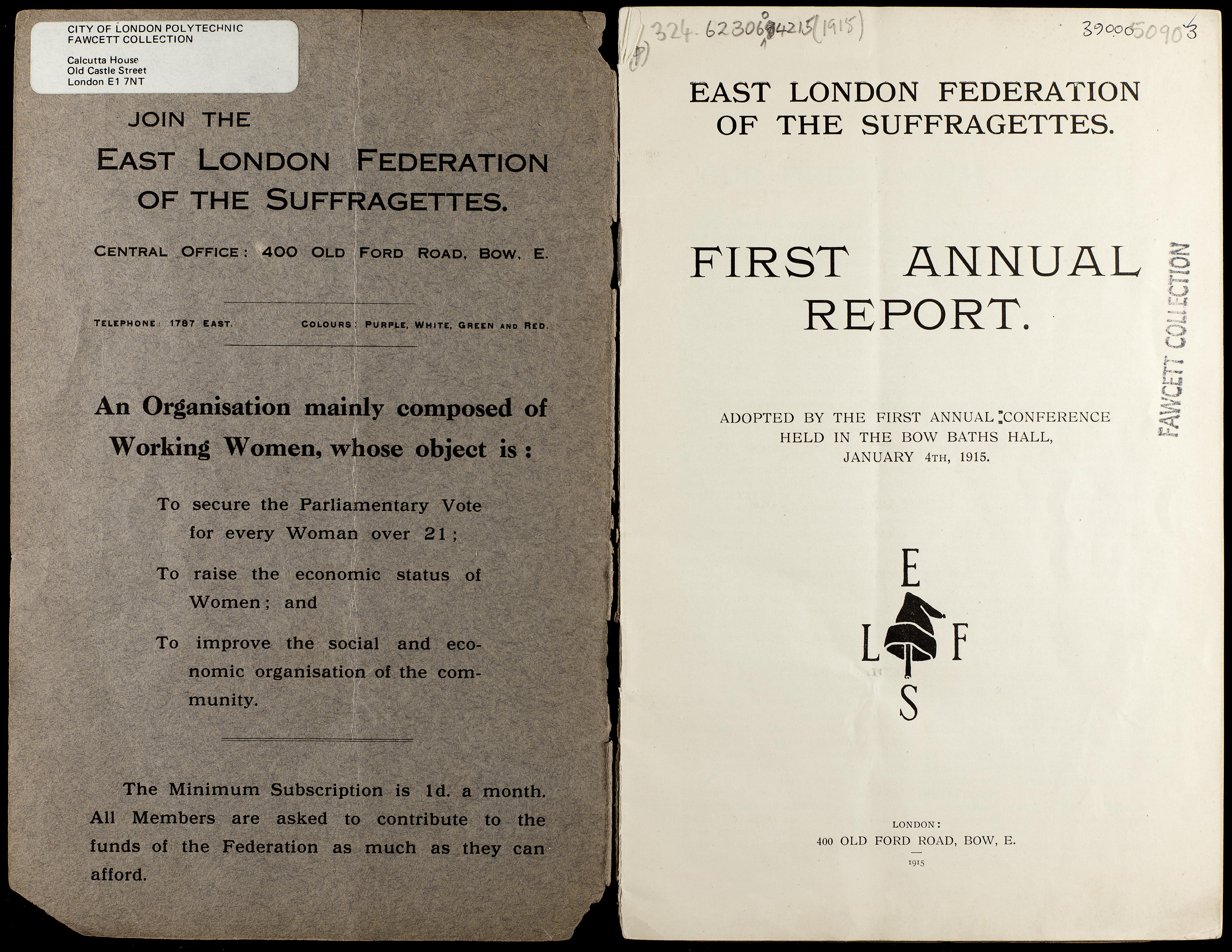
East London Federation of Suffragettes

== Recognition ==
Her name and picture (and those of 58 other women's suffrage supporters) are on the plinth of the statue of Millicent Fawcett in Parliament Square, London, unveiled in 2018.

She is commemorated in the Julia Scurr garden at the John Scurr Primary School in Stepney.
