= Ellen Smith (Fabian) =

Ellen E. Smith was a British suffragette and social reformer.

Smith joined the Fabian Society in 1906, and became active in the Fabian Women's Group, particularly in its campaign for women's suffrage. In 1908, she was one of eleven group members to serve time in prison for their suffrage activities. On release, she was made assistant secretary of the group, but suffered frequent poor health as a result of her time inside. With her health gradually improving, she became secretary of the group in 1912, and during this time organised the Enquiry as to Dependents of Women Breadwinners. She was also a member of the United Suffragists and the Association of Women Clerks and Secretaries, and served on the executive of the Fabian Society for a period in the 1910s.
