= Jessie Payne =

- Jessie Payne in 1914
- Born: Jessie Avery; 1864
- Died: 1933 (aged 68–69)
- Occupation: Suffragist
- Spouse: Jim Payne (m. 1884)

Jessie Payne (née Avery; 1864–1933) was part of the deputation of working class female members of the East London Federation of Suffragettes (ELFS) that visited Prime Minister H. H. Asquith in June 1914 seeking votes for all women.

== Early life ==
Born in Bethnal Green, Jessie and her sister were brought up by their maternal grandparents, both shoe makers, since their mother, who had spent some time in the workhouse, had remarried after the death of her husband. Jessie learnt to sew boots at the age of ten, having been assisting her grandparents from a young age. She was a member of the Salvation Army in Bow, London.

== Family ==
Jessie married Jim Payne in 11 October 1884 and they both worked as boot makers, running their own business from their home. Together they had 2 children, one of whom died at birth; the other, a daughter, was severely disabled and died in 1912 aged 27. The 1911 census lists James and Jessie Payne as residents at 28 Ford Road, Roman Road, Bow (occupying 6 rooms) with their daughter, also named Jessie, who is described as ‘imbecile’. Her early life as well as her married home is described in some detail in the writings of Sylvia Pankhurst.

== East London Federation of Suffragettes ==
Jessie was an early recruit to the East London Federation of Suffragettes (ELFS), the organisation instigated by Sylvia Pankhurst after she was expelled from the WSPU by her sister, Christabel Pankhurst.

Jessie committed herself to the cause and was instrumental in the organisation: nursing Sylvia to health after her imprisonments, initiating the Milk Fund campaign, attending meetings and representing working women in two deputations to the government. She received a badge for selling over one thousand copies of the Women’s Dreadnought, the campaigning newspaper published by Sylvia Pankhurst.

It was to the Paynes' house in Ford Road (demolished in the 1960s) that Sylvia Pankhurst was brought in July 1913, weak, hungry and physically damaged, having been released from prison on licence after her hunger strike. Sylvia said of the couple, ‘they were the kindest of kind people’. Ford Road was described in 1897 as being 'very poor'with a mix of businesses and houses, and the Lord Morpeth pub nearby. Sylvia stayed there for a year and describes the house and street in an article she wrote for the Daily Herald, 'A Prisoner of Bow'. She also describes, in the Women's Dreadnought, making a speech from the window of the house in November 1913.

== Deputation ==
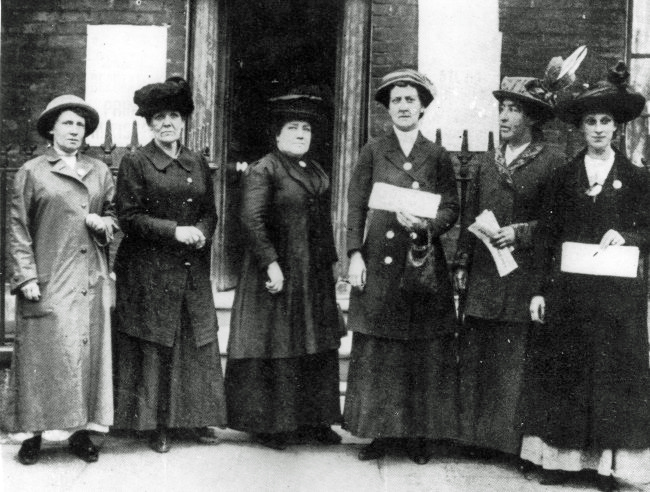
Payne (2nd from left) in 1914 suffragette deputation

By 1914 Sylvia Pankhurst was determined that Asquith should be made aware of the feelings of working women on the vote. Rallies were held throughout East London to elect a deputation; Jessie Payne was selected. The proposal was that 'All women over the age of 21 years should have the vote.' Asquith refused the deputation and Sylvia was arrested on the resulting march to Downing Street. On her release on 18 June, Sylvia was carried, unable to walk, to the Houses of Parliament where she declared her intention to starve and thirst until the deputation was received. The working women of the East End had lobbied their MPs all week. As the police were about to drag Sylvia from the steps of the Serjeant-at-Arms' office, news came, via Kier Hardy, that Asquith had relented.

The deputation on 20 June of Mrs Savoy, Mrs Bird, Mrs Daisy Parsons, Mrs Watkins and Mrs Payne was led by Mrs Julia Scurr. They described to Asquith their experiences of the life of women in East London, and what the vote meant to them. Jessie was the last to speak. In support of votes for all, she cited the injustice of women being denied a say in law making, despite being pivotal in the home, and railed against the forthcoming Mental Deficiency Bill which, she said, would be passed by people who have had no dealings in caring for the mentally ill and would not understand their needs: The Elementary Education (defective and epileptic children) Bill would allow local education authorities to take from their parents without consent any child over seven whom they deemed to be ‘mentally defective’ and to send them to institutions. Mrs Payne explained to Asquith that when their young daughter had become unmanageable she and her husband had 'felt compelled to take her to the workhouse' but when she visited and questioned the standard of care, she was told by a doctor that a mother had no voice in the matter, only the father could affect change. Asquith appeared to be moved and hinted that the vote was possible. The deputation was deemed a success, although Asquith reneged on his promise. Jessie Payne was also part of another delegation to see the President of the Board of Trade in Autumn, 1914, to argue for food controls.

== The Women's Hall ==
In early 1914 Norah Smyth and Sylvia Pankhurst sought new premises for the headquarters of ELFS so bought and moved into 400 Old Ford Road, Bow. It was a large establishment, being a double fronted house (formerly a mission) with a hall attached (formerly a small chapel). The latter was converted by the ELFS members and the men of the RSPU (Rebels Social and Political Union) into a Women’s Hall, to provide premises for a creche and cost price restaurant. The celebration of the opening of The Women’s Hall was held on 5 May 1914, Sylvia’s 32nd birthday, and the Paynes moved in to the house to be live-in caretakers. From here, Jessie was central to the distribution of charity. During the Great War she initiated the ELFS campaign to provide milk for babies from impoverished families after she witnessed a rush of mothers with under-nourished and starving babies clamouring for insufficient milk supplies. Jessie and Jim Payne, having already helped neighbours with shoe repairs, took responsibility for teaching their skills in the boot-making factory set up by the ELFS in a workshop at the rear of their premises at 45 Norman Road, which was run on cooperative lines.

== Later life ==
After the closure of the hall (1924), Jessie and Jim Payne continued to live in various houses in the East End and died within two years of each other in the 1930s, after the introduction of equal suffrage in 1928.
