= Adelaide Knight =

British suffragette (1871–1950)

- Adelaide Knight and Donald Adolphus Brown
- Born: 1871; London, England
- Died: 1950 (aged 78–79)
- Occupations: Suffragette and political activist
- Organization(s): Women's Social and Political Union, Adult Suffrage Society, Communist Party of Great Britain, Workers' Educational Association
- Spouse: Donald Adolphus Brown
- Children: 6, including Winifred Langton

Adelaide Knight, also known as Eliza Adelaide Knight, (1871–1950), was a British suffragette and communist. She was a founding member of the Communist Party of Great Britain (CPGB).

== Biography ==
Born in Tower Hamlets, East End of London, in 1871, Eliza Adelaide ("Addy") Knight was a frail child, born with deformed thumbs, who had two accidents in childhood which led to her enduring poor health. Due to her childhood injuries, she used a stick or crutches.

== Activism ==
In 1905 Knight joined the Women's Social and Political Union (WSPU) and worked as secretary for the organisation's first East London branch in Canning Town, established by Annie Kenney and Minnie Baldock. In 1906 suffragettes Knight, Annie Kenney, and Mrs. Jane Sbarborough were arrested along with Teresa Billington-Greig when they tried to obtain an audience with H. H. Asquith, a prominent member of the Liberal Party. Offered either six weeks in prison or giving up campaigning for one year, despite her poor health Knight chose prison, as did the other women. Kenney, in her autobiography, described Knight as "extraordinarily clever."

She joined the Central Committee of the WSPU, but resigned from the organisation in 1907 due to its lack of democracy, her view that WSPU leadership failed to keep their promises to working women and having witnessed a false claim made by Christabel Pankhurst in order to promote enfranchisement for propertied women only. Following this, Knight and her husband joined the Adult Suffrage Society and she became the branch secretary for Canning Town.

== Later life ==
Knight served as a Poor Law Guardian for West Ham. She developed a friendship with Dora Montefiore with whom she travelled to France in 1908 to address meetings there. In March 1909, Knight resigned as branch secretary of the Adult Suffrage Society due to illness through pregnancy and received letters of thanks. She moved from Plaistow to Abbey Wood later that year with her family.

In 1920 she joined the Communist Party of Great Britain (CPGB) as a founding member with Dora Montefiore but declined an invitation to join a delegation to the Soviet Union due to poor health. In Abbey Wood she joined the Women's Cooperative Guild and, together with her husband, the Independent Labour Party and the Workers Educational Association.

== Family ==
Knight married Donald Adolphus Brown (1874–1949), the son of a Guyanese naval officer and an English mother, in 1894. Donald took his wife's surname and became known as Donald Knight. The couple had four children between 1895 and 1901, three of whom died in a smallpox outbreak in 1902. Adelaide gave birth to another son in 1904 and a daughter in 1909. Her husband worked as a foreman at the Royal Arsenal, Woolwich, where he received a medal for bravery for tackling a fire there.

Knight died in 1950; her husband had died a year earlier. Their daughter, Winifred Langton, wrote a memoir of her parents edited by Addy's granddaughter, Fay Jacobsen, entitled Courage. She wrote that her father "vigorously supported his wife in every possible direction" and reflected that she learned to fight from her mother and to care from her father.
