= Margot Eates =

British art historian and curator

Margot Eates M.B.E.
- Born: 23 June 1913; London, England
- Died: 24 September 1994
- Partner: Hartley (E.H.) Ramsden
- Mother: Mary Louise Eates

Margot Eates (23 June 1913 – 24 September 1994) was a British art historian and curator who led the London Museum (predecessor institution to the Museum of London) through the second world war.

== Early life and education ==
Eates was born in London to parents Augustus Reginald Eates (a general practitioner) and Mary Louise Eates (a lecturer and campaigner for women's suffrage).

== Career ==
After working for several seasons at Maiden Castle hill fort excavation, Eates inherited professional responsibilities from Tessa Verney Wheeler following her death, including dealing with the press and inducting new workers. Eates was one of many women trained by Tessa Verney Wheeler who played a significant role in early twentieth century archaeology, and was one of the early organisers who established the Institute of Archaeology, in London.

Eates then joined the staff of the London Museum (one of two organisations which become the Museum of London), giving lectures to students. She went on to manage the movement of the collection into storage during the war, and worked on keeping the London Museum open, campaigning for the use of Lancaster House premises and co-curating the 'New Movements in Art' exhibition. She became the first example of a TV archaeologist when she presented a programme about the Maiden Castle excavations as a live broadcast on the BBC on 14 July 1937.

After the war Eates turned her attention to art, and in 1948 producing the first book about her friend Paul Nash, following his death in 1946. Eates worked closely with her partner Hartley Ramsden throughout their lives together, and contributed to Ramsden's volumes on Michelangelo. Eates later turned her efforts to church preservation, campaigns against airport extensions, and urban gardening.

== Personal life ==
Eates met Hartley Ramsden in 1930 and the two were described as 'life colleagues' in their obituaries. The Tate Archive contains their papers, including an account of the early part of their loving relationship written by Eates. Their 1987 joint portrait by Lucinda Douglas-Menzies is held by the National Portrait Gallery.
