= Louise Eates =

British suffragette and activist

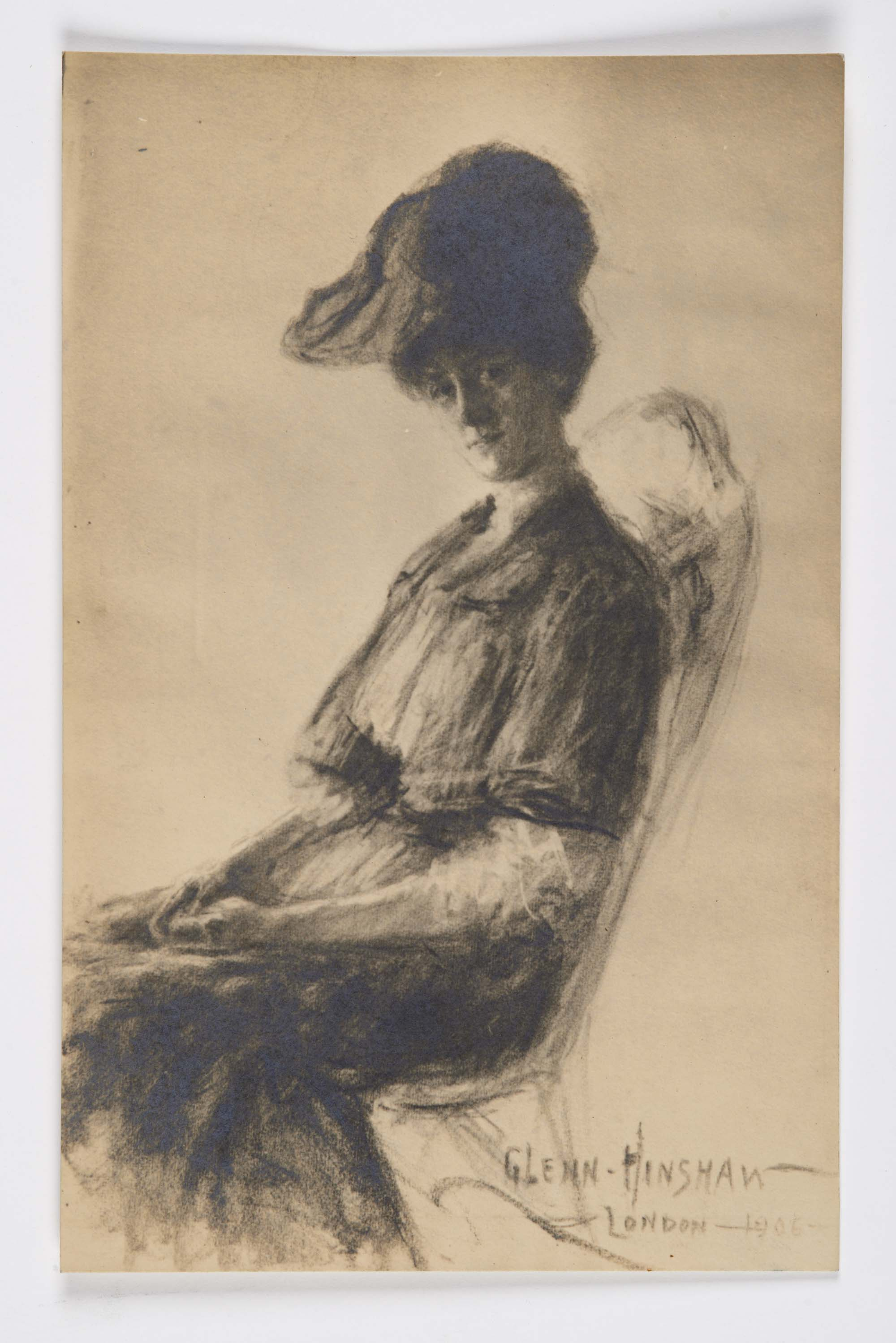
- Postcard of Eates by Glenn Hinshaw
- Born: Louise Mary Peters; 1877; Richmond, North Yorkshire, England
- Died: 1944 (aged 66–67); London, England
- Education: The Mary Erskine School
- Known for: Chair of Kensington Women's Social and Political Union
- Spouse: Dr Augustus Reginald Eates
- Children: One

Louise Mary Eates (née Peters; 1877–1944) was a British suffragette, chair of Kensington Women's Social and Political Union and a women's education activist.

== Life ==
Louise Mary Peters was born in Richmond, Yorkshire in 1877. She was educated at Edinburgh Ladies College.

She married Augustus Reginald Eates M.B. (1871–1963), a general practitioner in Kensal Rise, in 1901. Eates took an interest in female workers' conditions, as honorary secretary to the Investigation Committee of the Women's Industrial Council. Her husband interested her in the suffrage issue and other public questions. He supported her when she spoke at the London Society for Women's Suffrage and joined the Women's Social and Political Union in 1906-7 becoming the (chair ) Secretary of the Kensington branch from 1906 to 1910.

In June 1907, Eates hosted other middle-class women in her drawing room in Knightsbridge, where she paid Minnie Baldock from WSPU one shilling and sixpence to give a talk on how important suffrage was to working women. Eates had encouraged Baldock to bring a 'real' working woman Jane Sbarborough with her. Her guests gave 'many nice compliments' to the speaker. Her two guests were later arrested for their suffrage activism. Eates again invited Baldock to 'make the rich and idle women realise the difficulties that drive poor women to demand the Vote', and this time included Emmeline Pankhurst and Gertrude Conolan as speakers.

These events raised awareness of the situation of working women and may have helped encourage funding the WSPU cause in this large and active branch, which raised £32 in its first year and £804 in 2010. In one year, Eates's branch sold almost 26,000 copies of Votes for Women and set up an innovative 'Votes for Women' shop in Church Street, Kensington.

A postcard etching of Eates, seated in a large hat, was drawn by Glenn Hinshaw and signed in support of women's suffrage. A copy of the postcard is in the Museum of London collection and it is displayed here.

== Imprisonment and release ==
Eates was arrested and charged with obstruction, sentenced to one month in prison, along with eight others including Emmeline Pethick-Lawrence who rushed the St. Stephen's Entrance to the House of Commons in an attempt to meet the Prime Minister in March 1909. This was the day after three other suffragettes including Emily Davison were also in court for obstruction. The incident was reported in the WSPU Votes for Women 2 April 1909, pp 506–7.

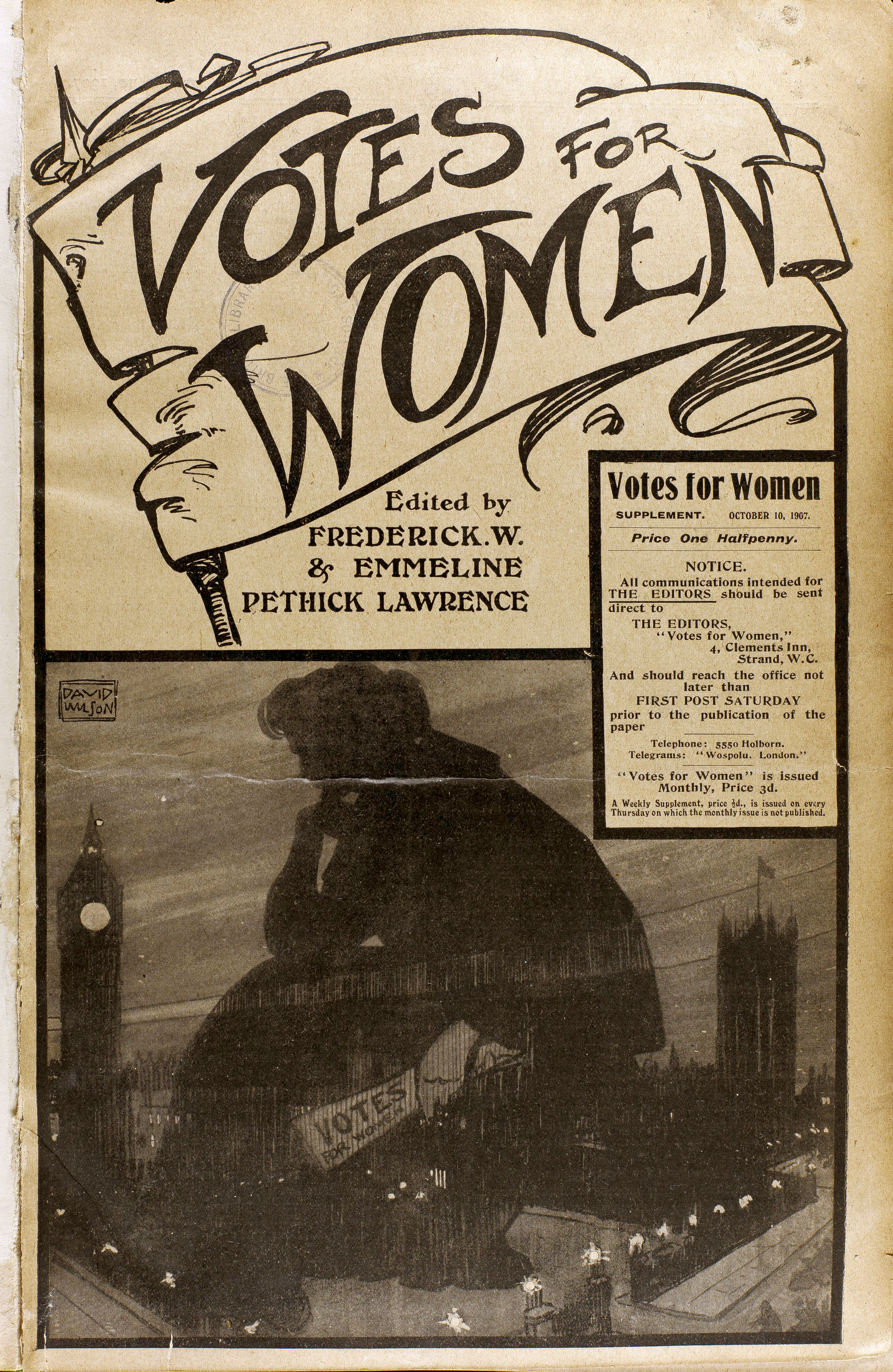
Votes for Women newspaper 1907 (22797474871)

Upon Eates's release from prison, a special piece of jewellery - enamelled silver pendant of the winged Hope figure singing outside prison bars with semi-precious stones in a chain in the WSPU colours of purple, white and green - was commissioned from silver artist and enameler, Ernestine Mills This is now held in the Museum of London. The old Kensington Town Hall was hired for a celebration meeting by the branch after greeting her at the gates of Holloway Prison on her release.

Pendant presented to Louise Eates

In January 1910, Eates organised for WSPU in the election campaign in the Kensington (North) Division, and in December 2010 in the constituency of West St. Pancras. She marshalled processions in Kensington and spoke on one of the main platforms at the Hyde Park rally.

She travelled throughout the country in the Midlands and Wales. From 1910 to 1913, she and her husband were in India and Vienna, then living in Marylebone on their return to London.

Eates joined the Pethick-Lawrence's United Suffragists, with Agnes Harben and her husband, which welcomed women and men, former militants and non-militants at the start of the Great War in 1914, and continued to publish Votes for Women until the passing of the Representation of the People Act 1918 gave (some) women the vote and the group and its newspaper were disbanded.

== Later life ==
Eates served on the governing committee of the St. John's Wood Infant Welfare Centre and Day Nursery from 1917 to 1923. She taught at the Workers Educational Association and was involved in the Women's Institute in the 1920s in Kent, where she moved in 1924. Back in London in 1927, Eates ran classes at the Young Women's' Christian Association in Acton from 1929-30: Citizenship Class and Debating Circle.

Eates had one daughter, Margot Eates, who worked as curator and art historian at the Museum of London during the 1930s and World War II.

Louise Eates died in London in 1944, her last address being 135 Avenue Road, Acton, West London.
