= Annie Somers =

British political organiser

Annie Somers (1881 – 1 January 1954) was a British political organiser.

Born in Liverpool, Somers attended Stockwell College of Education, the North London Collegiate School, and Bedford College, before graduating from Birkbeck College, University of London with a degree in Mental and Moral Science and Maths.

Somers became a secondary school teacher in London in 1905, then from 1916 worked as an accountant. She became active in the National Union of Clerks and Administrative Workers, and was elected to its council in 1920. She also became active in the Labour Party, and in 1921 was appointed as its full-time London Woman Organiser. She retired from the post in 1941.

In her spare time, Somers was a supporter of women's suffrage, and a leading figure in the United Suffragists. She was also a member of the 1917 Club, and a governor of Birkbeck.

Party political offices
Preceded by New position?	Labour Party London Women's Organiser; 1921–1941	Succeeded by Joan Bourne
