= Daisy Parsons =

British suffragette

Daisy Parsons MBE
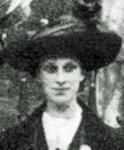
- Born: Marguerite Lena Millo; 21 May 1890; Poplar, London, England
- Died: 29 September 1957 (aged 67); Stratford, Essex, England
- Known for: Suffragette activist politician

Marguerite Lena Parsons MBE (née Millo; 21 May 1890 – 29 September 1957), known as Daisy Parsons, was a British suffragette. She was part of a delegation to the Prime Minister in 1914. She later became a councillor and, in 1937, she was West Ham's first woman mayor.

== Life ==
Parsons was born in Poplar in London in 1890. Her father, Alfred Albert Millo, dealt in jewellery when he was well. Her mother, Elizabeth, worked as a charlady. She had five younger brothers and she left school early so that she could care for them. At fourteen she was a maid working for the local librarian. Parsons took piecework in a tobacco factory and she was surprised to find how little she earned compared to the men, who also had comfortable restroom for breaks, women only had toilets. She brought up an orphaned niece and three daughters with her husband, Robert Stanley (Tom) Parsons, who was a driver for the Stepney Borough Council and a union activist. They married on 19 December 1908 in the Congregational Chapel, Barking Road, Plaistow.

When Parson's eldest child became due for a vaccination she applied to have an exemption but she was told that only fathers could apply.

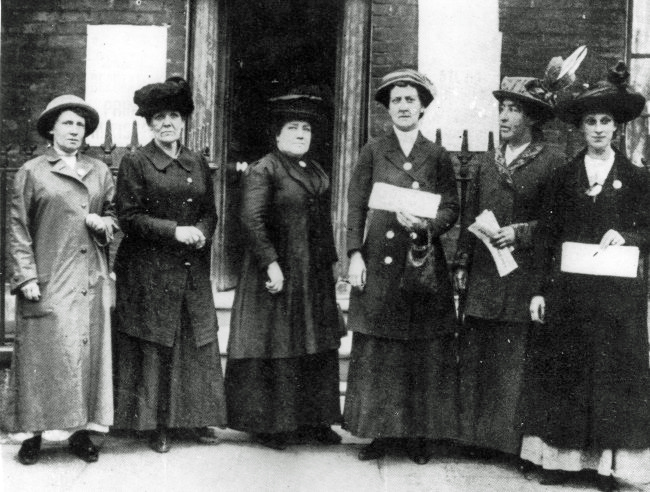
The 1914 deputation - Parsons is on the right

Parsons was inspired by Minnie Baldock in Canning Town and so she joined Sylvia Pankhurst's East London Federation of Suffragettes and became the secretary of the branch in South West Ham. In 1914, Sylvia Pankhurst went on hunger strike and refused to stop until the Prime minister received women so that they could present their case for the vote. Asquith agreed and Parsons was able to tell him of her problems, as she was one of the six women chosen including Jessie Payne, led by Mrs Julia Scurr. She told Asquith that she gave birth to children but she had little say in deciding "what is good for them." During World War I, the East London Federation of Suffragettes opened a baby clinic and Parsons was the manager. She was remembered as assertive and persuasive.

After the war, she was asked to help the local council distribute help for mothers. She joined the Maternity and Child Welfare Committee in 1919. In 1922 she was elected as a socialist borough councillor on the West Ham Council. In 1931 she was deputy Mayor, a Justice of the Peace in 1933, and then in 1935 she was made an Alderman and the following year she became West Ham's first female Mayor.

As Mayor, she opened the local lido, got to drive the first local trolleybus and returned to the youth club in Canning Town which had inspired her.

During World War Two, Parsons organised children's evacuation locally and helped organise the Women's Voluntary Service. Her brother and a niece were killed in the Blitz.

Parsons was awarded the honour of the Freedom of West Ham in 1939, and MBE in the New Year Honours of 1951 and she died in Stratford in London in 1957.

There is a mural made as communal art at Hermit Road Park, a testament to how well she was regarded in this area.

Civic offices
Preceded by Cuthbert St Clair Collins	Mayor of West Ham; 1936–1937	Succeeded by Esther Bock
