= Mud March (suffragists) =

1907 demonstration by suffragists in London

Poster advertising the march and meeting, 9 February 1907

The United Procession of Women, or Mud March as it became known, was a peaceful demonstration in London on 9 February 1907 organised by the National Union of Women's Suffrage Societies (NUWSS), in which more than three thousand women marched from Hyde Park Corner to the Strand in support of women's suffrage. Women from all classes participated in the largest public demonstration supporting women's suffrage seen up to that date. It acquired the name "Mud March" from the day's weather; incessant heavy rain left the marchers drenched and mud-spattered.

The proponents of women's suffrage were divided between those, known as suffragists, who favoured constitutional methods and those who supported direct action, who became known as suffragettes; the NUWSS were constitutional suffragists. The split between the two factions was formalised in 1903 by Emmeline Pankhurst, who formed the Women's Social and Political Union (WSPU). This organisation held demonstrations, heckled politicians and, from 1905, saw several of its members imprisoned for their increasingly militant actions, which gained press attention and increased support from women. To maintain that momentum and to create support for a new suffrage bill in the House of Commons, the NUWSS and other groups organised the Mud March to coincide with the opening of Parliament. The event attracted much public interest and broadly sympathetic press coverage, but when the bill was presented the following month, it was "talked out" without a vote.

While the march failed to influence the immediate parliamentary process, it had a considerable impact on public awareness and on the movement's future tactics. Large peaceful public demonstrations, never previously attempted, became standard features of the suffrage campaign; on 21 June 1908 up to half a million people attended Women's Sunday, a WSPU rally in Hyde Park. The marches showed that the fight for women's suffrage had the support of women in every stratum of society, who despite their social differences were able to unite and work together for a common cause.

== Background ==
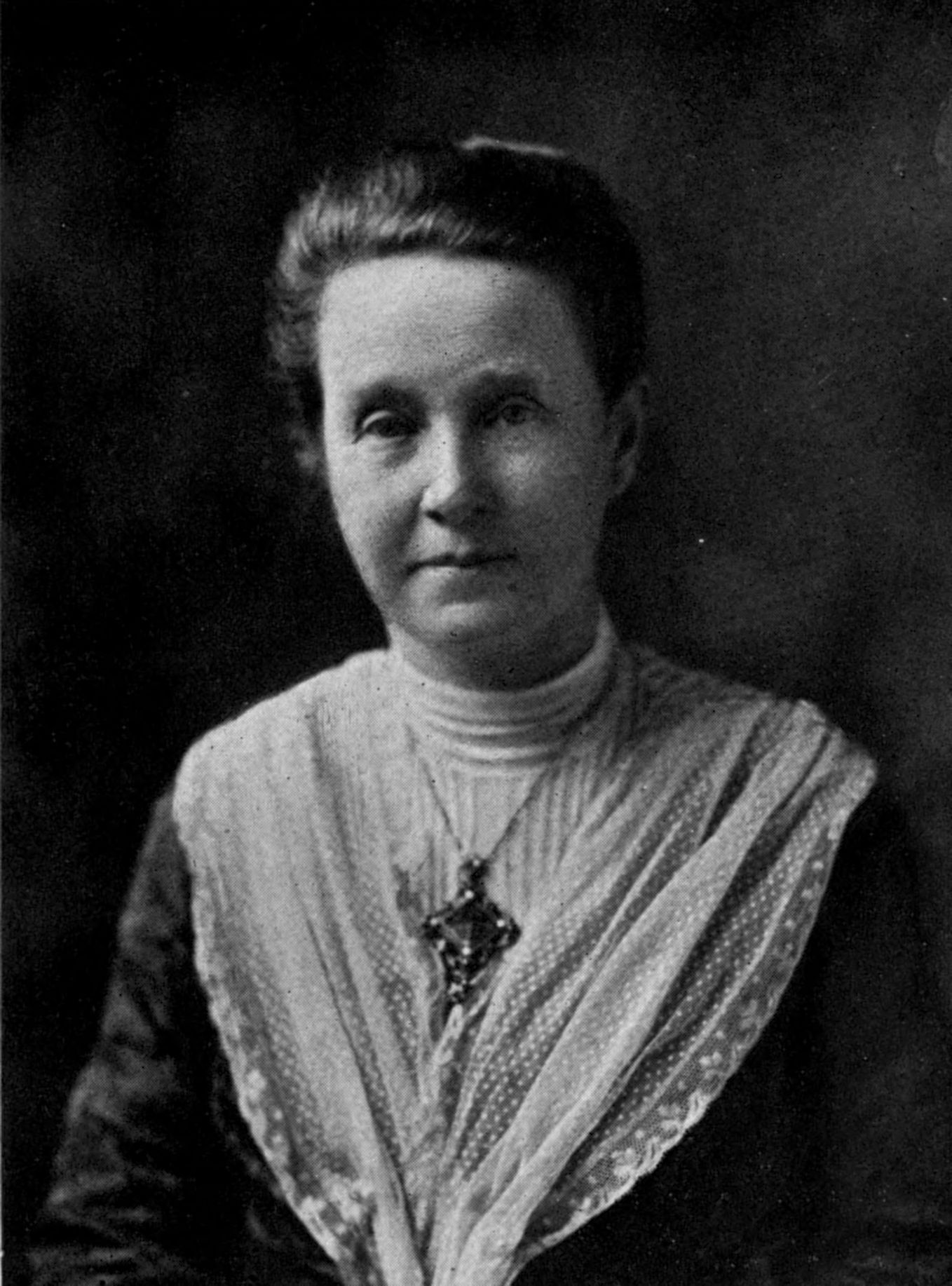
Millicent Garrett Fawcett of the National Union of Women's Suffrage Societies (NUWSS)

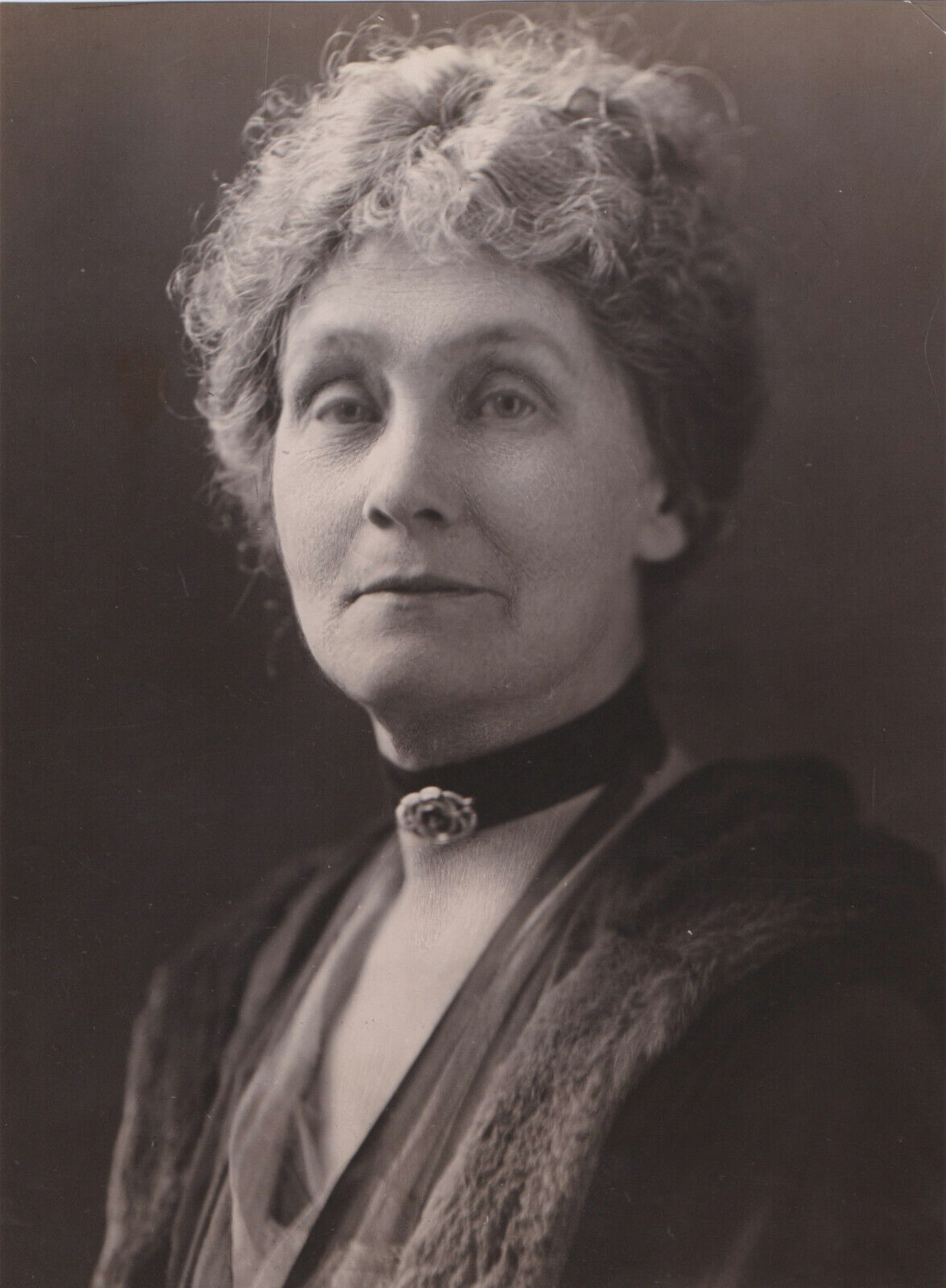
Emmeline Pankhurst of the Women's Social and Political Union (WSPU)

In October 1897 Millicent Fawcett was the driving force behind the formation of the National Union of Women's Suffrage Societies (NUWSS), an umbrella organisation for all the factions and regional societies, liaising with sympathetic MPs. Initially, seventeen groups affiliated with the body. The organisation became the leading body following a constitutional path to women's suffrage. In October 1903 Emmeline Pankhurst and her daughter Christabel formed a women-only group in Manchester, the Women's Social and Political Union (WSPU). Although the NUWSS sought its objectives through constitutional means, such as petitions to Parliament, members of the WSPU organised open-air meetings, heckled politicians and chose jail over fines when they were prosecuted. From 1906 the WSPU began to use the nickname "suffragettes", which differentiated it from the constitutionalist "suffragists". (Note: In January 1906 the Daily Mail coined the term suffragettes for WSPU members; they adopted the label with pride.)

At the time of the Mud March, before the suffragette campaign had developed to damaging property, relations between the WSPU and NUWSS remained cordial. When eleven suffragettes were jailed in October 1906 after a protest in the House of Commons lobby, Fawcett and the NUWSS stood by them. On 27 October 1906, in a letter to The Times, she wrote:

The real responsibility for these sensational methods lies with the politicians, misnamed statesmen, who will not attend to a demand for justice until it is accompanied by some form of violence. Every kind of insult and abuse is hurled at the women who have adopted these methods, especially by the "reptile" press. But I hope the more old-fashioned suffragists will stand by them; and I take this opportunity of staying that in my opinion, far from having injured the movement, they have done more during the last twelve months to bring it within the region of practical politics than we have been able to accomplish in the same number of years.

The militant actions of the WSPU raised the profile of the women's suffrage campaign in Britain and the NUWSS wanted to show that they were as committed as the suffragettes to the cause. In January 1906 the Liberal Party, led by Sir Henry Campbell-Bannerman, had won an overwhelming general election victory; although before the election many Liberal MPs had promised that the new administration would introduce a women's suffrage bill, once in power, Campbell-Bannerman said that it was "not realistic" to introduce new legislation. A month after the election, the WSPU held a successful London march attended by 300 to 400 women. To show there was support for a suffrage bill, the Central Society for Women's Suffrage suggested, in November 1906, holding a mass procession in London to coincide with the opening of Parliament in February. The NUWSS called on its members to join the march.

== March ==
=== Organisation ===
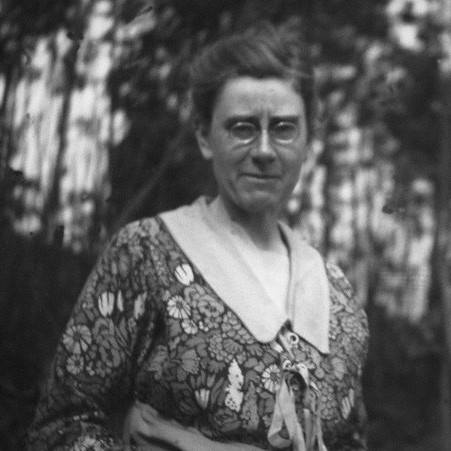
Pippa Strachey in 1921

The task of organising the event, scheduled for Saturday, 9 February 1907, was delegated to Pippa Strachey of the Central Society for Women's Suffrage. (Note: In 1907 the Central Society for Women's Suffrage, the organiser of the Mud March, became the London Society for Women's Suffrage (LSWS). Based at 25 Victoria Street, with 62 London branches, it was a middle-class organisation with the aim of "equal suffrage", according to Sowon S. Park. By 1912 it had 4,000 members and 20,000 "friends". It became the London Society for Women's Service in 1919. Pippa Strachey was secretary of the LSWS from 1914 to 1919 and secretary of the London Society for Women's Service from 1919 to 1926, when the latter became the London and National Society for Women's Service.) Her mother, Lady [Jane] Strachey, a friend of Fawcett, was a long-standing suffragist, but Pippa had shown little interest in the issue before a meeting with the educationalist and feminist Emily Davies, who quickly converted her to the cause. She took on the organisation of the London march with no previous similar experience, but carried out the task so effectively that she was given responsibility for the planning of all future large processions of the NUWSS. On 29 January the executive committee of the London Society determined the order of the procession and arranged for advertisements to be placed in the Tribune and The Morning Post.

Regional suffrage societies and other organisations were invited to bring delegations to the march. The art historian Lisa Tickner writes that "all sensibilities and political disagreements had to be soothed" to make sure the various groups would take part. The Women's Cooperative Guild would attend only if certain conditions were met, and the British Women's Temperance Association and Women's Liberal Federation (WLF) would not attend if the WSPU was formally invited. The WLF—a "crucial lever on the Liberal government", according to Tickner—objected to the WSPU's criticism of the government. At the time of the march, ten of the twenty women who sat on the NUWSS executive committee were connected with the Liberal Party. Strachey arranged for some of the men from the Bloomsbury Group to help with the march; several assisted, including her brother—the psychoanalyst James Strachey—and the economist John Maynard Keynes.

The march was scheduled to begin at Hyde Park Corner and progress via Piccadilly to Exeter Hall, a large meeting venue in the Strand. A second open-air meeting was scheduled for Trafalgar Square. Members of the Artists' Suffrage League produced posters and postcards for the march. In all, around forty organisations from all over the country chose to participate.

=== 9 February ===
On the morning of 9 February, large numbers of women converged on the march's starting point, the statue of Achilles near Hyde Park Corner. Between three and four thousand women were assembled, from all ages and strata of society, in appalling weather with incessant rain; "mud, mud, mud" was the dominant feature of the day, wrote Fawcett. The marchers included Lady Frances Balfour, sister-in-law of Arthur Balfour, the former Conservative prime minister; Rosalind Howard, the Countess of Carlisle, of the Women's Liberal Federation; the poet and trade unionist Eva Gore-Booth; and Emily Davies. In addition to the aristocratic representation, attendees included a large number of professional women—doctors, schoolmistresses, artists—and large contingents of working women from northern and other provincial cities, marching under banners that proclaimed their varied trades: bank-and-bobbin winders, cigar makers, clay-pipe finishers, power-loom weavers and shirt makers.

Although the WSPU was not officially represented, many of its members attended, including Christabel Pankhurst, Emmeline Pethick-Lawrence, Annie Kenney, Anne Cobden-Sanderson, Nellie Martel, Edith How-Martyn, Flora Drummond, Charlotte Despard and Gertrude Ansell. It was common for women to be members of both organisations and to attend the events of both and wear the two badges they provided for members.

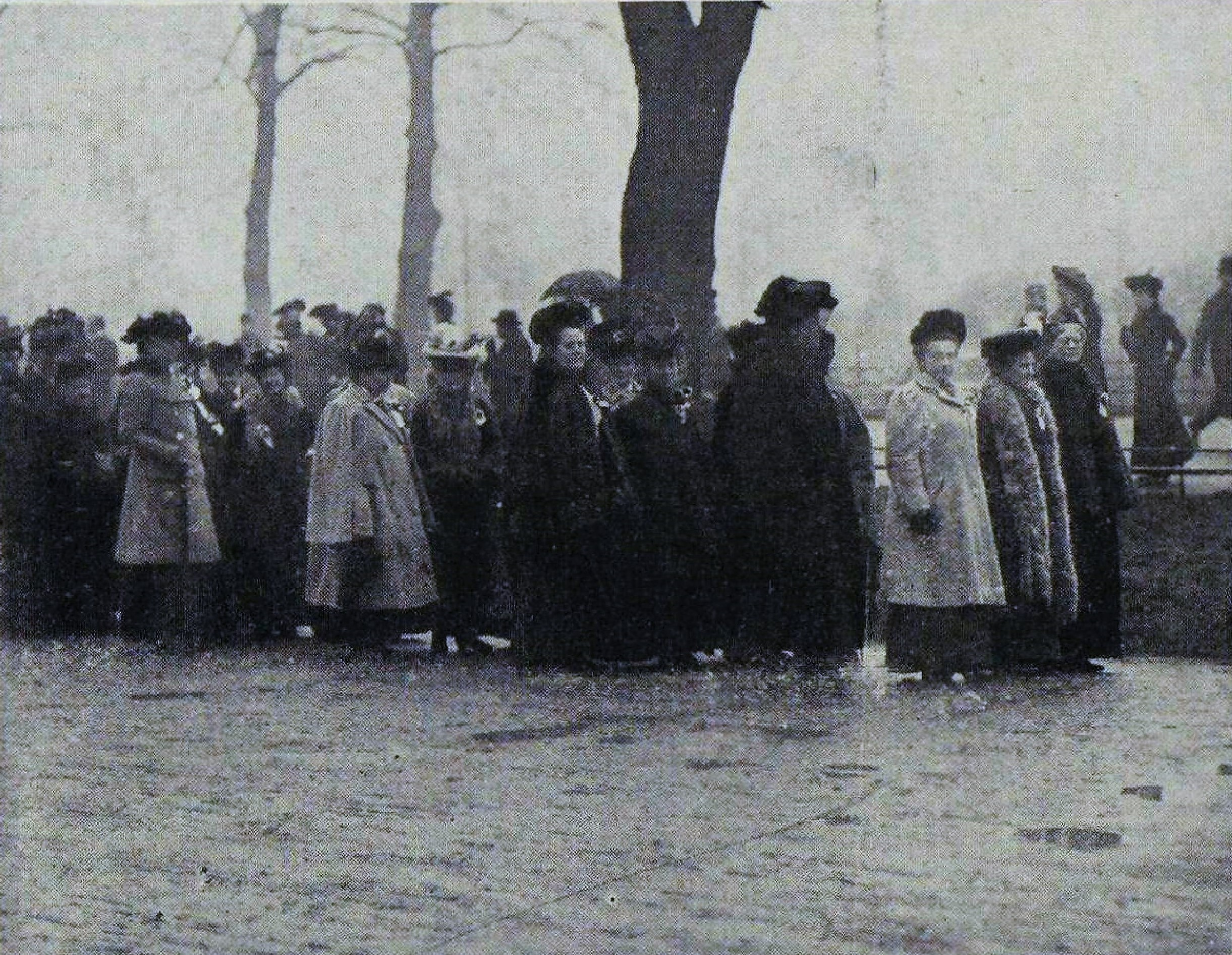
At the head of the march (left to right), Lady Frances Balfour in the light coat, Millicent Garrett Fawcett and Lady Strachey

By around 2:30 pm in pouring rain, the march had formed a column that stretched far down Rotten Row. It was led by Lady Frances Balfour, Millicent Fawcett and Lady Strachey, immediately followed by a brass band. They were followed by carriages and motor cars, many of which carried flags bearing the letters "WS", red-and-white banners and bouquets of red and white flowers. Around 7,000 red-and-white rosettes had been provided for the marchers by the manufacturing company of Maud Arncliffe-Sennett, an actor and leader among the London Society for Women's Suffrage and the Actresses Franchise League. Despite the weather, thousands thronged the pavements; according to the historian Harold Smith they were there to enjoy the novel spectacle of "respectable women marching in the streets".

Contemporary reports differ in their reporting of how the spectators behaved. The Observer's reporter recorded that "there was hardly any of the derisive laughter which had greeted former female demonstrations", although The Morning Post reported "scoffs and jeers of enfranchised males who had posted themselves along the line of the route, and appeared to regard the occasion as suitable for the display of crude and vulgar jests". Katharine Frye, who joined the march at Piccadilly Circus, recorded "not much joking at our expense and no roughness". The Daily Mail—which supported women's suffrage—carried an eyewitness account, "How It Felt", by Constance Smedley of the Lyceum Club. Smedley described a divided reaction from the crowd "that shared by the poorer class of men, namely, bitter resentment at the possibility of women getting any civic privilege they had not got; the other that of amusement at the fact of women wanting any serious thing ... badly enough to face the ordeal of a public demonstration".

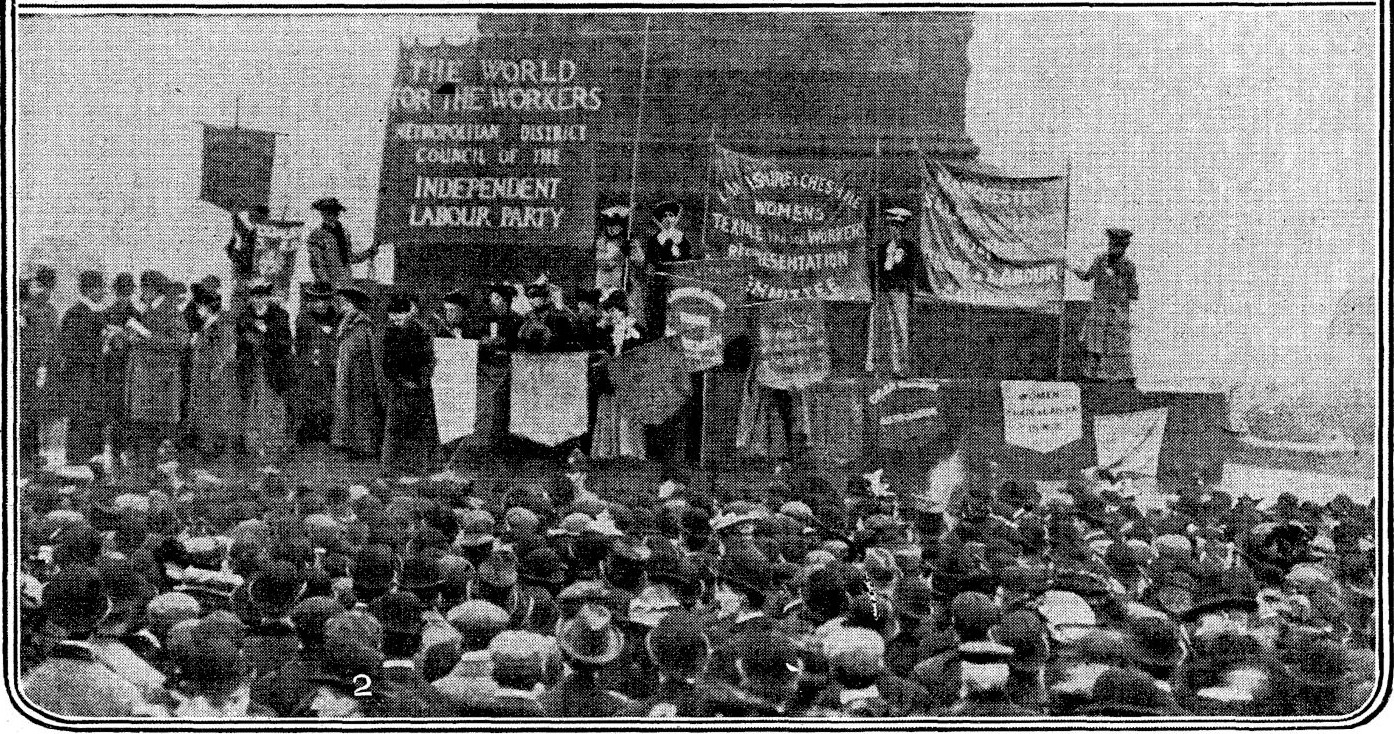
The rally at the base of Nelson's Column, Trafalgar Square

Approaching Trafalgar Square the march divided: representatives from the northern industrial towns broke off for an open-air meeting at Nelson's Column, which had been arranged by the Northern Franchise Demonstration Committee. The main march continued to Exeter Hall for a meeting chaired by the Liberal politician Walter McLaren, whose wife, Eva McLaren, was one of the scheduled speakers. Keir Hardie, leader of the Labour Party, told the meeting, to hissing from several Liberal women on the platform, that if women won the vote, it would be thanks to the "suffragettes' fighting brigade". He spoke strongly in favour of the meeting's resolution, which was carried, that women be given the vote on the same basis as men, and demanded a bill in the current parliamentary session. At the Trafalgar Square meeting Eva Gore-Booth referred to the "alienation of the Labour Party through the action of a certain section in the suffrage movement", according to The Observer, and asked the party "not to punish the millions of women workers" because of the actions of a small minority. When Hardie arrived from Exeter Hall, he expressed the hope that "no working man bring discredit on the class to which he belonged by denying to women those political rights which their fathers had won for them".

== Aftermath ==
=== Press reaction ===
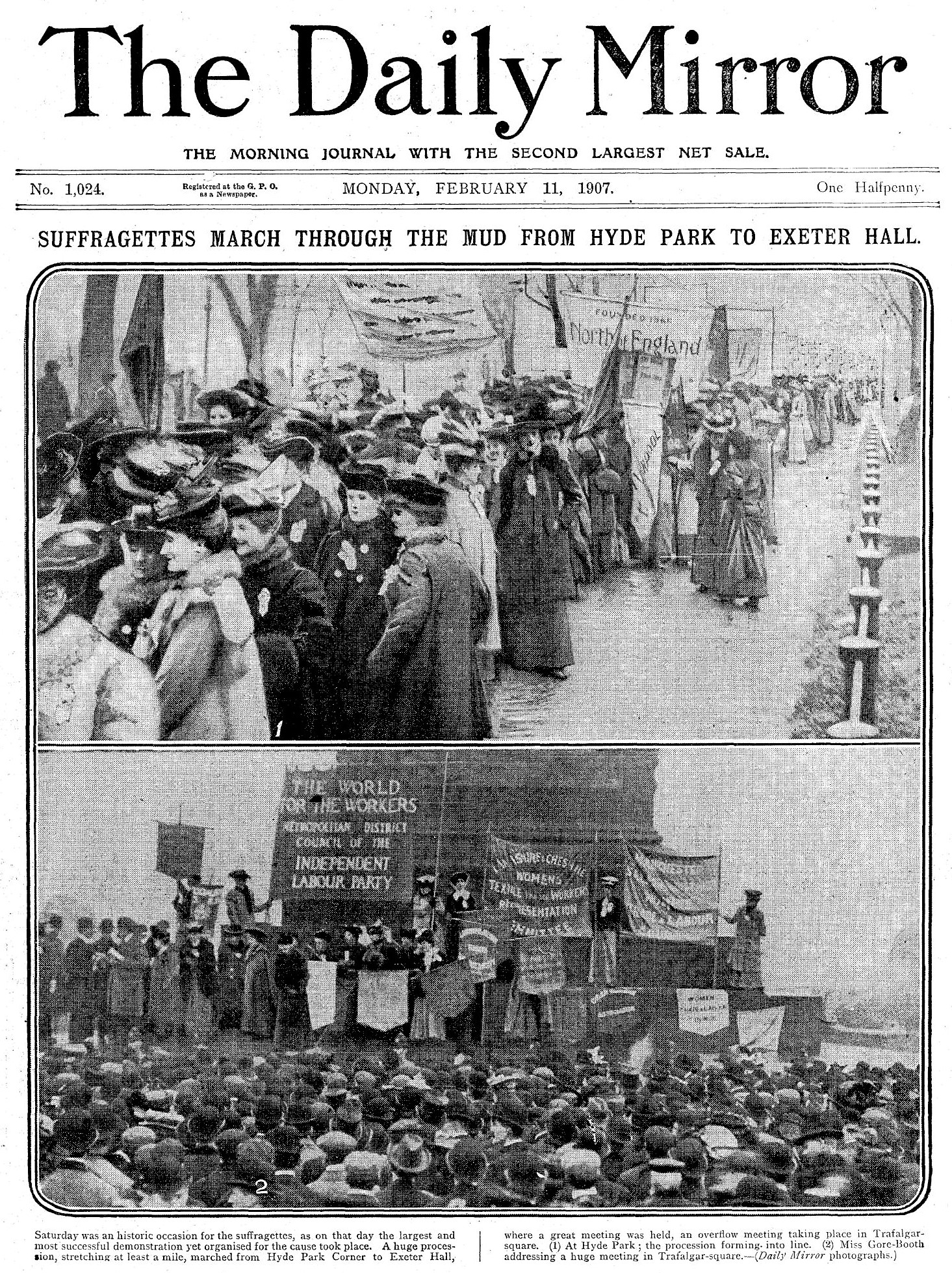
Front page of The Daily Mirror, 11 February 1907

The press coverage gave the movement "more publicity in one week than it had enjoyed in the previous fifty years", according to one commentator. Tickner writes that the reporting was "inflected by the sympathy or otherwise of particular newspapers for the suffrage cause". The Daily Mirror, which was neutral on the issue of women's suffrage, offered a large photospread and praised the crowd's diversity of classes. The Tribune also commented on the mix of social classes represented in the marchers. The Times, an opponent of women's suffrage, thought the event "remarkable as much for its representative character as for its size" and described the scenes and speeches in detail over 20 column inches.

The protesters had had to "run the gauntlet of much inconsiderate comment", according to the Daily Chronicle, a publication supportive of women's suffrage. The pictorial journal The Sphere provided a montage of photographs under the headline "The Attack on Man's Supremacy". The Graphic, a pro-suffrage paper, published a series of illustrations sympathetic to the event. It also carried one that showed a man holding aloft a pair of scissors "suggesting that demonstrating women should have their tongues cut out", according to Katherine Kelly in a study of how the suffrage movement was portrayed in the British press. Some newspapers, including The Times and the Daily Mail, carried pieces written by some of the marchers.

In its leading article, The Observer warned that "the vital civic duty and natural function of women ... is the healthy propagation of race" and that the aim of the movement was "nothing less than complete sex emancipation". It was concerned that women were not ready for the vote and opined that the movement should educate women rather than "seeking to confound men". The newspaper nevertheless welcomed that there had been "no attempts to bash policemen's helmets, to tear down the railings of the Park, to utter piercing war cries ..." Likewise, The Daily News compared the event favourably to the actions of suffragettes: "Such a demonstration is far more likely to prove the reality of the demand for a vote than the practice of breaking up meetings held by Liberal Associations." The Manchester Guardian agreed: "For those ... who, like ourselves, wish to see this movement—a great movement, as will one day be recognised—carried through in such a way as to win respect even where it cannot command agreement Saturday's demonstration was of good omen."

=== Dickinson Bill ===
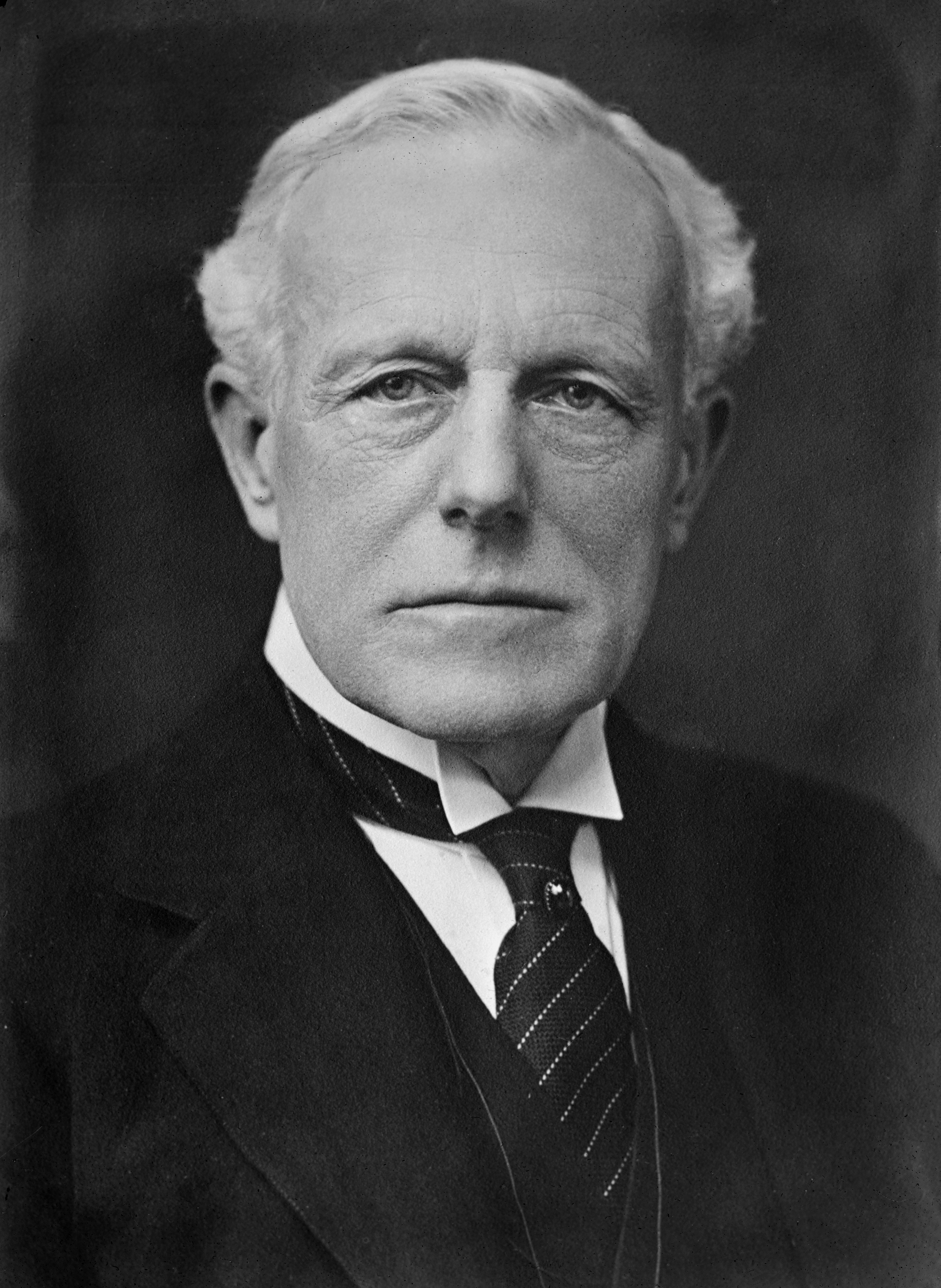
Willoughby Dickinson, the sponsor of the failed 1907 suffrage bill

Four days after the march, the NUWSS executive met with the Parliamentary Committee for Women's Suffrage (founded 1893) to discuss a private member's bill. On the same day, the suffragettes held their first "Women's Parliament" at Caxton Hall, after which four hundred women marched toward the Commons to protest against the omission of a women's suffrage bill from the King's Speech the day before; over sixty were arrested and fifty-three chose prison over a fine.

On 26 February 1907 the Liberal MP for St Pancras North, Willoughby Dickinson, published the text of a bill proposing that women should have the vote subject to the same property qualification that applied to men. That would, it was estimated, enfranchise between one and two million women. (Note: At the time sixty per cent of the male population were enfranchised, a result of the Representation of the People Act 1884.) Although the bill received strong backing from the suffragist movement, it was viewed more equivocally in the House of Commons, some of whose members regarded it as giving more votes to the propertied classes but doing nothing for working women. On 8 March Dickinson introduced his Women's Enfranchisement Bill to the House of Commons for its second reading, with a plea that members should not be swayed by their distaste for militant actions; the House's "Ladies' Gallery" was kept closed during the debate for fear of protests by the WSPU. The debate was inconclusive and the bill was "talked out" without a vote. The NUWSS had worked hard for the bill and found the response insulting.

=== Legacy ===
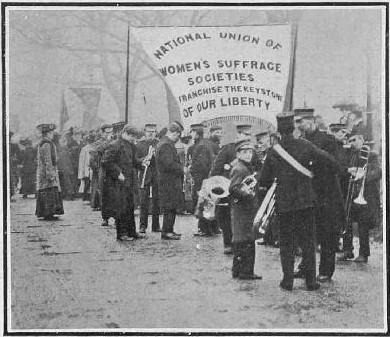
The band and lead banner

The Mud March was the largest public demonstration in support of woman's suffrage until that point. Although it brought little by way of immediate progress on the parliamentary front, its significance in the general suffrage campaign was considerable. By embracing activism, the constitutionalists' tactics become closer to those of the WSPU, at least in relation to the latter's non-violent activities. In her 1988 study of the suffrage campaign, Tickner observes that "modest and uncertain as it was by subsequent standards, [the march] established the precedent of large-scale processions, carefully ordered and publicised, accompanied by banners, bands and the colours of the participant societies". The feminist politician Ray Strachey wrote:

In that year the vast majority of women still felt that there was something very dreadful in walking in procession through the streets; to do it was to be something of a martyr, and many of the demonstrators felt that they were risking their employments and endangering their reputations, besides facing a dreadful ordeal of ridicule and public shame. They walked, and nothing happened. The small boys in the streets and the gentlemen at the club windows laughed, but that was all. Crowds watched and wondered; and it was not so dreadful after all ... the idea of a public demonstration of faith in the Cause took root.

The historian Sophia A. van Wingerden considers the Mud March a success, as it "display[ed] the unity of the suffrage movement and secur[ed] wide publicity for the movement and the cause.

The march marked a change in perception of the NUWSS from what The Manchester Guardian described as "regional debating society" into the sphere of "practical politics". According to Jane Chapman, in her study Gender, Citizenship and Newspapers, the Mud March "established a precedent for advance press publicity". According to the historian Chien-hui Li, the Mud March was a "political spectacle and media sensation"; it influenced other campaigning organisations, including the Animal Defence and Anti-Vivisection Society, who took elements of the Mud March—including the use of colourful banners and bands—for their 1909 march at the International Anti-Vivisection and Animal Protection Congress in London.

The failure of Dickinson's bill brought about a change in the NUWSS's strategy; it began to intervene directly in by-elections on behalf of the candidate of any party who would publicly support women's suffrage. In 1907 the NUWSS supported the Conservatives in Hexham and Labour in Jarrow; where no suitable candidate was available they used the by-election to propagandise. This tactic met with enough success for the NUWSS to decide that it would become active in all future by-elections, and between 1907 and 1909 they had been involved in 31, campaigning in support of any candidate who supported women's suffrage, regardless of their political affiliation.

From 1907 to the start of the First World War in 1914, the NUWSS and suffragettes held several peaceful demonstrations. On 13 June 1908 over ten thousand women took part in a London march organised by the NUWSS, and on 21 June the suffragettes organised Women's Sunday in Hyde Park, which was attended by up to half a million. During the NUWSS's Great Pilgrimage of April 1913, women marched from all over the country to London for a mass rally in Hyde Park, which fifty thousand attended. Women were partly enfranchised by the Representation of the People Act 1918, which granted the vote to women over 30 who owned property with a rateable value above £5, or whose husbands did; (Note: £5 in 1918 is approximately equivalent to £246 in 2025, according to calculations based on the Consumer Price Index measure of inflation.) women then constituted 39.6 per cent of the electorate. The restriction that only those eligible to vote in the local elections by virtue of their property status meant that approximately 22 per cent of women aged 30 and above were not enfranchised. The Act also extended the franchise for men aged 21 or over. Full enfranchisement of all women over 21 came ten years later, when the Representation of the People (Equal Franchise) Act of 1928 was passed by a Conservative government under Stanley Baldwin.

The Mud March is featured in window number four of the stained-glass Dearsley Windows in St Stephen's Hall in the Palace of Westminster. The window includes panels depicting, among other things, the formation of the NUWSS, WSPU and Women's Freedom League, the NUWSS's Great Pilgrimage, the force-feeding of suffragettes, the Cat and Mouse Act 1913 and the death of Emily Davison the same year. The window was installed in 2002 as a memorial to the long and ultimately successful campaign for women's suffrage.

== See also ==
- List of MPs elected in the 1906 United Kingdom general election
- Women's Sunday, 1908 suffrage march and rally in London
- Women's Coronation Procession, 1911 suffrage march in London
- Suffrage Hikes, 1912 to 1914 marches in the US
- Woman Suffrage Procession, 1913 march in Washington, DC
- Great Pilgrimage, 1913 suffrage march in the UK
- Silent Sentinels, 1917 to 1919 protest in Washington, DC
- Selma to Montgomery marches, 1965 suffrage marches in the US

== Notes and references ==
=== Sources ===
==== Books ====
- Atkinson, Diane (2018). Rise Up, Women! The Remarkable Lives of the Suffragettes. London: Bloomsbury. ISBN 978-1-4088-4407-6.
- Chapman, Jane (2013). Gender, Citizenship and Newspapers: Historical and Transnational Perspectives. London: Palgrave Macmillan. ISBN 978-1-1373-1459-8.
- Cowman, Krista (2010). Women in British Politics, c. 1689–1979. Basingstoke: Palgrave Macmillan. ISBN 978-0-2305-4556-4.
- Crawford, Elizabeth (2003). The Women's Suffrage Movement: A Reference Guide 1866–1928. London: UCL Press. ISBN 978-1-1354-3402-1.
- Crawford, Elizabeth, ed. (2013). Campaigning for the Vote: Kate Parry Frye's Suffrage Diary. London: Francis Boutle Publishers. ISBN 978-1-9034-2775-0.
- Fara, Patricia (2018). A Lab of One's Own: Science and Suffrage in the First World War. Oxford: Oxford University Press. ISBN 978-0-1987-9498-1.
- Fawcett, Millicent Garrett (1925). What I Remember. New York: Putnam. OCLC 917605074.
- Hawksley, Lucinda (2017). March, Women, March. London: Andre Deutsch. ISBN 978-0-2330-0525-6.
- Hill, Leslie (2000). "Suffragettes Invented Performance Art". In de Gay, Jane; Goodman, Lizabeth (eds.). The Routledge Reader in Politics and Performance. London: Routledge. pp. 150–156. ISBN 978-1-1346-8666-7.
- Holton, Sandra Stanley (2003) [1986]. Feminism and Democracy: Women's Suffrage and Reform Politics in Britain, 1900–1918. Cambridge: Cambridge University Press. ISBN 978-0-5215-2121-5.
- Hume, Leslie (2016) [1982]. The National Union of Women's Suffrage Societies 1897–1914. London: Routledge. ISBN 978-1-3172-1327-7.
- Li, Chien-hui (2019). Mobilizing Traditions in the First Wave of the British Animal Defense Movement. London: Palgrave Macmillan. doi:10.1057/978-1-137-52651-9. ISBN 978-1-1375-2650-2.
- Morris, Homer Lawrence (1921). Parliamentary Franchise Reform in England From 1885 to 1918. New York: Columbia University. OCLC 1002391306.
- Pankhurst, Sylvia (1911). The Suffragette: The History of the Women's Militant Suffrage Movement. New York: Sturgis & Walton Company. OCLC 66118841.
- Pilkington, Colin (1999). The Politics Today Companion to the British Constitution. Manchester: Manchester University Press. ISBN 978-0-7190-5303-0.
- Purvis, June (2018). Christabel Pankhurst: A Biography. London and New York: Routledge. ISBN 978-0-8153-7149-6.
- Raeburn, Antonia (1974). The Militant Suffragettes. London: New English Library. OCLC 969887384.
- Smith, Harold L. (2014). The British Women's Suffrage Campaign 1866–1928: Revised 2nd Edition. London: Routledge. ISBN 978-1-3178-6225-3.
- Strachey, Ray (1928). The Cause: A Short History of the Women's Movement in Great Britain. London: Bell and Sons. OCLC 1017441120.
- Tickner, Lisa (1987). The Spectacle of Women: Imagery of the Suffrage Campaign 1907–14. London: Chatto & Windus. ISBN 978-0-7011-2952-1.
- Tickner, Lisa (2004). "Banners and Banner-Making". In Schwartz, Vanessa R.; Przyblyski, Jeannene M. (eds.). The Nineteenth-century Visual Culture Reader. London: Routledge. pp. 341–347. ISBN 978-0-4153-0866-3.
- van Wingerden, Sophia A. (1999). The Women's Suffrage Movement in Britain, 1866–1928. London: Palgrave Macmillan UK. ISBN 978-0-3336-6911-2.

==== Journals ====
- Caine, Barbara (September 2001). "Feminism in London, Circa 1850-1914". Journal of Urban History. 27 (6): 765–778. doi:10.1177/009614420102700605.
- Holton, Sandra Stanley (2008). "National Union of Women's Suffrage Societies (act. 1896–1918)". Oxford Dictionary of National Biography (online ed.). Oxford University Press. doi:10.1093/ref:odnb/96378. (Subscription, Wikipedia Library access or UK public library membership required.)
- Kelly, Katherine E. (2004). "Seeing through Spectacles: The Woman Suffrage Movement and London Newspapers, 1906–13". European Journal of Women's Studies. 11 (3): 327–353. doi:10.1177/1350506804044466. S2CID 143436264.
- Park, Sowon S. (February 2005). "Suffrage and Virginia Woolf: 'The Mass behind the Single Voice'". The Review of English Studies. 56 (223): 119–134. doi:10.1093/res/hgi007. JSTOR 3661192.

==== Newspapers ====
- "(Unknown title)". Daily Chronicle. 11 February 1907. p. 6.
- "Enfranchisement of Women: The Bill "Talked Out"". The Manchester Guardian. 9 March 1907. p. 9.
- Fawcett, Millicent (27 October 1906). "The Imprisoned Suffragists". The Times. p. 9.
- "Lady Day". The Observer. 10 February 1907. p. 6.
- "Leading Article". The Manchester Guardian. 11 February 1907. p. 6.
- "London, Monday, February 11, 1907". The Times. 11 February 1907. p. 9.
- Smedley, Constance (11 February 1907). "How it Felt". Daily Mail. p. 7.
- "Titled Demonstrators". The Observer. 10 February 1907. p. 7.
  - "Titled Demonstrators: Mr Hardie's Speech". The Observer. 10 February 1907. p. 7.
  - "Titled Demonstrators: The Procession". The Observer. 10 February 1907. p. 7.
- "The Attack on Man's Supremacy". The Sphere. 16 February 1907. p. 138.
- "The Women's March". The Daily Mirror. 11 February 1907. p. 4.
- "The Women's March". The Daily News. 11 February 1907. p. 6.
- "The Women Suffragists: A Muddy Promenade". The Morning Post. 11 February 1907. p. 5.
- "Women's Suffrage Demonstration". The Times. 11 February 1907. p. 11.

==== Websites ====
- "1918 Representation of the People Act". Houses of Parliament.
- "1928 Equal Franchise Act". UK Parliament.
- Caine, Barbara (23 September 2004). "Strachey, Philippa [Pippa]". Oxford Dictionary of National Biography (online ed.). Oxford University Press. doi:10.1093/ref:odnb/48519. (Subscription, Wikipedia Library access or UK public library membership required.) (subscription required)
- Clark, Gregory (2023). "The Annual RPI and Average Earnings for Britain, 1209 to Present (New Series)". MeasuringWorth.
- Crawford, Elizabeth (21 November 2012). "Kate Frye's Suffrage Diary: The Mud March, 9 February 1907". Woman and her Sphere.
- "Dearsley Bequest Window" (PDF). Houses of Parliament.
- "Dearsley Window 4, 1897–1997". Houses of Parliament.
- McKee, Mary (21 February 2018). "Maud Arncliff-Sennett – A Militant Suffragette". The British Newspaper Archive – Blog.
- "Suffragists or Suffragettes – Who Won Women the Vote?". BBC. 6 February 2018.
- "Women and the Vote: Founding of the National Union of Women's Suffrage Societies (NUWSS), 1897". Houses of Parliament.
- Zangwill, Israel (1907). "Talked Out!". British Library.
