= Mud March =

Mud March may refer to:

- Mud March (American Civil War), a Union winter offensive in January 1863
- Mud March (suffragists), a 1907 procession through London staged by the National Union of Women's Suffrage Societies
