= Women's Sunday =

Suffragette mass demonstration, London 1908

- Part of first-wave feminism
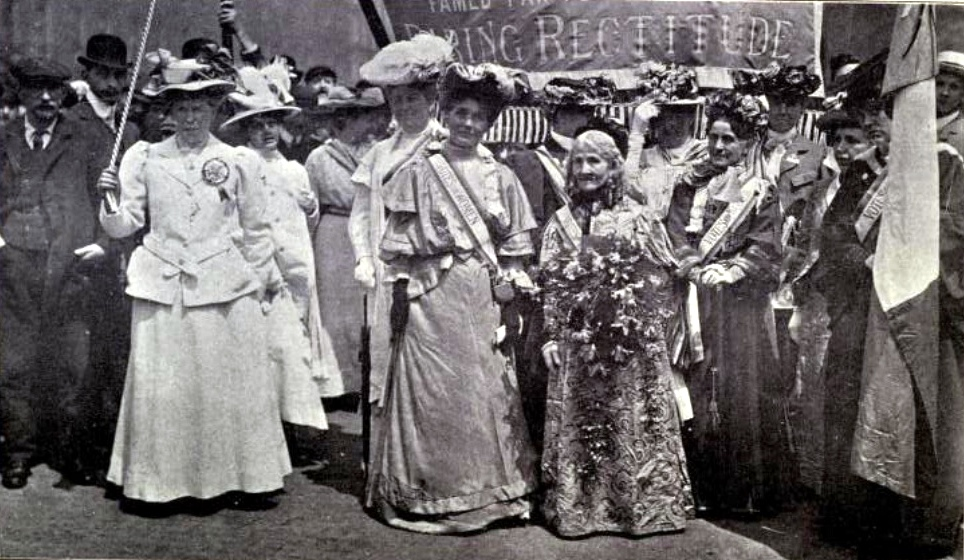
- Emmeline Pankhurst and Elizabeth Wolstenholme-Elmy of the Women's Social and Political Union at the head of the procession
- Date: 21 June 1908; 118 years ago
- Location: Hyde Park, London, England; 51.508611°N 0.163611°W
- Caused by: Fight for women's suffrage
- Methods: Marches, direct action
- Result: Up to 500,000 people participate

Parties
Women's Social and Political Union (WSPU)	Liberal government, 1905–1915

Lead figures
Emmeline Pankhurst (WSPU)	Prime Minister H. H. Asquith

Women's Sunday was a suffragette march and rally held in London on 21 June 1908. Organised by Emmeline Pankhurst's Women's Social and Political Union (WSPU) to persuade the Liberal government to support votes for women, it is thought to have been the largest demonstration to be held until then in the country.

Up to 500,000 women and men from all over the country attended the event, and 30,000 women marched to Hyde Park in seven processions and carried 700 banners, including one that read, "Not chivalry but justice".

== Processions ==
The event was organised by Emmeline Pethick-Lawrence, the WSPU's treasurer, and featured the WSPU colours (purple, white and green) for the first time in public. Women were asked to wear white dresses, and leading up to the event, shops offered displays of clothing for attendees. The Daily Chronicle noted: "White frocks will be prominent in the windows with a plentiful supply of dress accessories in violet and green". In the two days before the event, over 10,000 scarves in the colours were sold at two shillings and elevenpence each. Men wore ties in the colours.

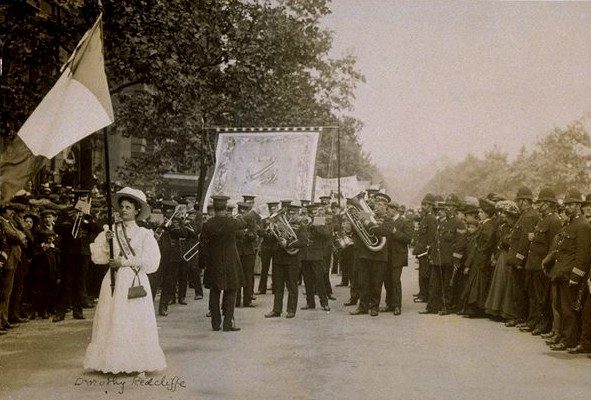
Dorothy Radcliffe holding aloft a purple, white and green flag in front of one of the seven bands

Stewards met attendees at the stations when they arrived in London in special trains from around the country. Around 30,000 women marched to Hyde Park in seven processions, each of which was headed by a chief marshal, who, in turn, led group marshals, captains and banner marshals. Emmeline Pankhurst, dressed in purple and accompanied by Elizabeth Wolstenholme-Elmy, led a procession from Euston Road. At Paddington, Annie Kenney led women from Wales, the Midlands and the West of England. Christabel Pankhurst and Emmeline Pethick-Lawrence led a procession from the Victoria Embankment. Also, 5,000 marched from Kensington, along with five brass bands.

Other attendees included Sylvia Pankhurst, Maud Pember Reeves, Mary Gawthorpe, Ethel Snowden, Keir Hardie, Louie Cullen, Hanna Sheehy-Skeffington, George Bernard Shaw, H. G. Wells, Thomas Hardy and Israel Zangwill. It was said that 300,000 spectators had witnessed the 700 suffragettes with their embroidered banners. The Daily Chronicle stated, "Never, has so vast a throng gathered in London to witness a parade of political forces". The Standard claimed, "From first to last it was a great meeting, daringly conceived, splendidly stage-managed, and successfully carried out. Hyde Park has probably never seen a greater crowd of people".

== See also ==
- Mud March, 1907 suffrage procession in London
- Women's Coronation Procession, 1911 suffrage march in London
- Suffrage Hikes, 1912 to 1914 in the US
- Woman Suffrage Procession, 1913 suffrage march in Washington, D.C.
- Great Pilgrimage, 1913 suffrage march in the UK
- Silent Sentinels, 1917 to 1919 protest in Washington, D.C.
- Selma to Montgomery march, 1965 suffrage march in the US

== Works cited ==
- Atkinson, Diane (2018). Rise Up Women!: The Remarkable Lives of the Suffragettes. London: Bloomsbury Publishing.
- Holten, Sandra Stanley (2003) [1986]. Feminism and Democracy: Women's Suffrage and Reform Politics in Britain, 1900–1918. Cambridge: Cambridge University Press.
- Tickner, Lisa (1988). The Spectacle of Women: Imagery of the Suffrage Campaign 1907–14. Chicago: University of Chicago Press.
