= Lizbeth Goodman =

Social scientist

Lizbeth Goodman is a British social scientist who is Professor of Inclusive Design for Education at University College Dublin, and a professor in the university's School of Mechanical and Materials Engineering.

== Education and career ==
Formerly a scholar of the theatre and a BBC television presenter, Goodman has master's degrees from the University of Cambridge and Washington University in St. Louis, and a doctorate from the Open University. While at Cambridge she was a member of the Footlights, being executive producer for Amazons!: The Official Version in 1990-1991 and Daughters of England in 1989-1990 and Women's Officer in 1989-1990.

After eight years teaching theatre at the Open University, leading the Institute for New Media Performance Research at the University of Surrey, and directing the SMARTlab Centre at Central Saint Martins College of Art & Design, she became Chair of Creative Technology Innovation at the University of East London in 2005, before moving to her present position at University College Dublin. She founded SMARTLab, now based at UCD, in 1992 and its ethos is "creative technology innovation for real social change".

Her research interests include inclusive design using technology including virtual reality to help people with autism or intellectual disabilities.

She is a member of the board of governors of Ravensbourne University London.

== Selected books ==
Goodman is the author or co-author of:

- Contemporary Feminist Theatres: To Each Her Own (Gender & Performance) by Lizbeth Goodman (Routledge, 1993). ISBN 978-0-415-07306-6. (Note: Reviews of Contemporary Feminist Theatres: Jill Dolan, TDR, doi:10.2307/1146431, JSTOR 1146431; Lesley Ferris, Modern Drama, doi:10.1353/mdr.1995.0020; E. D. Huntley, NWSA Journal, JSTOR 4316365; Bettina L. Knapp, World Literature Today, doi:10.2307/40150238, JSTOR 40150238; Ann Marie McEntee, Theatre Survey, doi:10.1017/S0040557400002684; Erika Munk, "Tragedy Tomorrow, Theory Tonight?", The Women's Review of Books, doi:10.2307/4021773, JSTOR 4021773; Janelle Reinelt, Theatre Research International, doi:10.1017/S0307883300007264; Sue Smith, Feminist Review, doi:10.2307/1395269, JSTOR 1395269; Esther Beth Sullivan, Theatre Journal, doi:10.2307/3208473, JSTOR 3208473)
- Literature and Gender: An Introductory Textbook (Approaching Literature) by Lizbeth Goodman (Routledge, 1996). ISBN 978-0-415-13574-0.
- Shakespeare, Aphra Behn and the Canon: An Introductory Textbook (Approaching Literature) by Lizbeth Goodman and W.R. Owens (Routledge, 1996). ISBN 978-0-415-13576-4. (Note: Reviews of Shakespeare, Aphra Behn and the Canon: Verna A. Foster, Restoration and 18th Century Theatre Research, ProQuest 1037990261; Kathy Howlett, The Scriblerian and the Kit-Kats, ProQuest 1220459307; Deborah Kaplan, Theatre Survey, doi:10.1017/S0040557400002234; Elizabeth Kraft, Medieval & Renaissance Drama in England, JSTOR 24322202; Andrew McCann, Australasian Drama Studies, ProQuest 1300402117)
- Feminist Stages: Interviews with Women in Contemporary British Theatre (Contemporary Theatre Studies) by Lizbeth Goodman and Jane de Gay (Routledge, 1997). ISBN 978-3-7186-5882-4. (Note: Reviews of Feminist Stages: Helen Nicholson, Research in Drama Education, ProQuest 217923120; Laurie J. Wolf, Theatre Research International, doi:10.1017/S0307883300018368)

Her edited volumes include:

- Imagining Women: Cultural Representations and Gender, Frances Bonner, Lizbeth Goodman, Richard Allen, Linda Janes, and Catherine King, editors (Polity Press, 1992) (Note: Reviews of Imagining Women: Rosemary Betterton, Women's Art Magazine, K. Gibson, K. Hewitt, and P. Saunders, Environment and Planning D: Society and Space, doi:10.1068/d1102; Cathy Lubelska, European Journal of Women's Studies, doi:10.1177/1350506894001001; Elizabeth C. Ramírez, Theatre Journal, doi:10.2307/3208472, JSTOR 3208472)
- The Routledge Reader in Gender and Performance by Lizbeth Goodman, and Jane de Gay, editors (Routledge, 1998). ISBN 978-0-415-16582-2. (Note: Reviews of The Routledge Reader in Gender and Performance: Glen Johnson, Lambda Book Report, EBSCOhost 1838775; Nicola Shaughnessy, New Theatre Quarterly, doi:10.1017/S0266464X00013191)
- The Routledge Reader in Politics and Performance by Jane de Gay and Lizbeth Goodman, editors (Routledge, 2000). ISBN 978-0-415-17473-2. (Note: Reviews of The Routledge Reader in Politics and Performance: Anna Birch, Critical Survey, JSTOR 41557095; Nadine George-Graves, Modern Drama, doi:10.1353/mdr.2003.0047; Estella Lauter, "Feminist Activist Art: Losing the Edge?", NWSA Journal, JSTOR 4317236)
- Languages of Theatre Shaped by Women by Jane de Gay and Lizbeth Goodman, editors (Intellect, 2003) (Note: Reviews of Languages of Theatre Shaped by Women: Elaine Aston, New Theatre Quarterly, doi:10.1017/S0266464X04290273; Rebecca D'Monté, Theatre Research International, doi:10.1017/S0307883304240603; Theresa Smalec, TDR, doi:10.1162/1054204042442062, JSTOR 4488603)
