= Gertrude Ansell =

English suffragette and animal welfare activist (1861–1932)

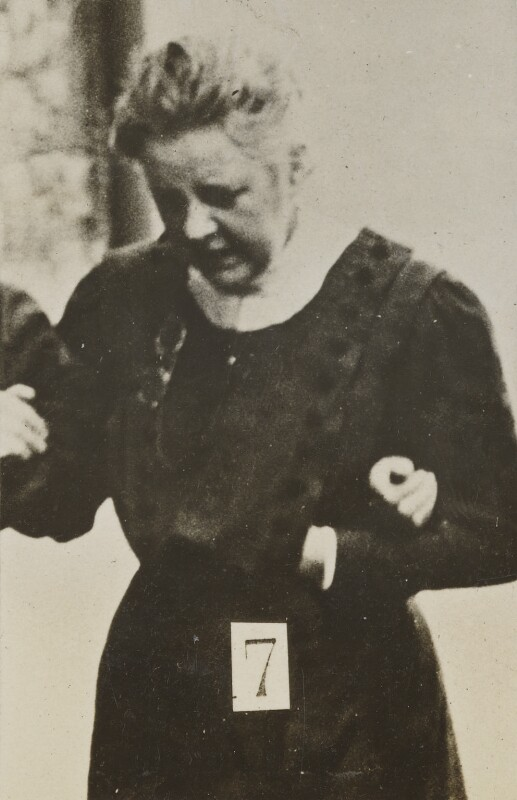
- Ansell c. 1914
- Born: Gertrude Mary Ansell; 2 June 1861; Bloomsbury
- Died: 7 March 1932 (aged 70)
- Occupation: Activist

Gertrude Mary Ansell (2 June 1861 – 7 March 1932) was an English suffragette, animal welfare activist and businesswoman. She was arrested, imprisoned and force fed hundreds of times. She was awarded the Hunger Strike Medal by the WSPU.

== Life ==
Ansell was the third child and only daughter of the metallurgist George Frederick Ansell (1826–1880) and his wife, Sarah (née Cook). Her father had, in 1856, been appointed to a clerkship in the Royal Mint with a brief to eliminate waste and mismanagement but was forced to give up his position in 1868. He died in 1880 leaving his family little. She attended Essex University. In 1881 Gertrude Ansell was working in a telephone office. By 1900, she had set up in business as a "typewriter".

Gertrude Ansell's thinking was dominated by the welfare of animals and the enfranchisement of women. In 1909, she became honorary treasurer of the Animal Defence and Anti-Vivisection Society and one of the organisers of that year's International Anti-Vivisection and Animal Protection Congress.

She believed that the economic position of women would never be satisfactory without political freedom and in December 1906 she joined the Women's Social and Political Union (WSPU). Ansell took part in the 'Mud March' of 9 February 1907 to Hyde Park at a time when 4000 people, both suffragists in NUWSS and more militant suffragettes in WSPU listened to Millicent Fawcett and many were less sympathetic to Keir Hardie speak up for a 'fighting brigade' to achieve female suffrage.

On 13 October 1908, she was arrested after taking part in a WSPU "raid" on the House of Commons and was sentenced to one month's imprisonment in Holloway Prison. At the end of that year she has heckling David Lloyd George dressed in her prison clothes at the Albert Hall. Lloyd George was trying to address a meeting of women Liberals.

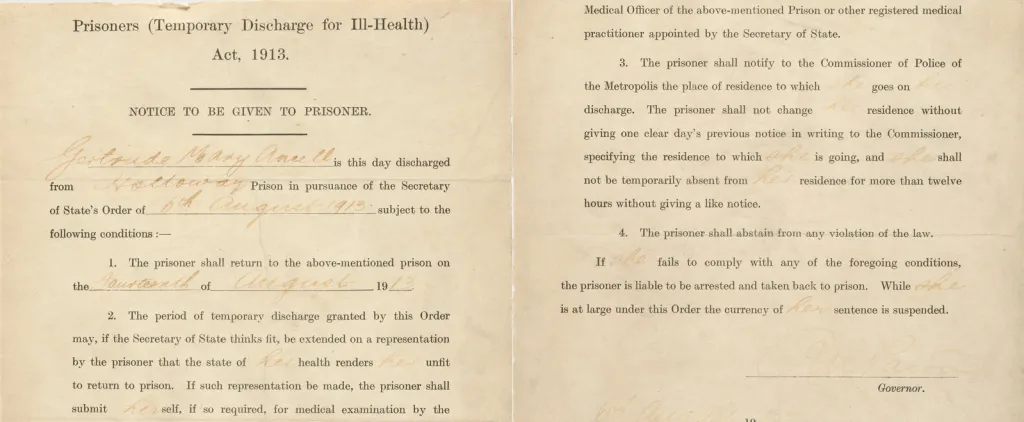
Gertrude Ansell release under the Cat and Mouse act on 6 August 1913

During the next five years, Ansell took part in all of the major WSPU spectacles, but she had given an undertaking to one of her animal committees not to take part in militant activity. She worked for the Dogs Exemption Bill and the Plumage Bill, but when they were rejected by the House of Commons in 1913 she returned to WSPU actions. On 31 July, she smashed a window at the Home Office and was sentenced to a month's imprisonment. She went on hunger strike and was released under the "Cat and Mouse Act". She was rearrested on 30 October at Holborn tube station while selling the WSPU's newspaper, The Suffragette. The UK's Criminal Record Office had circulated her photograph and description as a "known militant suffragette" (5 feet 4 inches, grey eyes, hair turning grey). She then followed a pattern of hunger strike, release, rearrest and imprisonment until she managed to evade the police.

On 12 May 1914, she smashed Hubert von Herkomer's portrait of the Duke of Wellington in the Royal Academy with an axe, causing £15 worth of damage. When arrested, she was reported to have said, "I have done my duty, and I wish that every other woman would do the same." She was sentenced to six months' imprisonment but this time she was not released and, because she continued her hunger and thirst strike, she was forcibly fed.

She was finally released on 10 August, under an amnesty for suffragette prisoners at the outbreak of the First World War. She had been forcibly fed 236 times. Ansell was given a WSPU Hunger Strike Medal, the citation engraved on the bar is 'For Valour' and the inscription says

"PRESENTED BY THE WOMEN'S SOCIAL AND POLITICAL UNION IN RECOGNITION OF A GALLANT ACTION, WHEREBY THROUGH ENDURANCE TO THE LAST EXTREMITY OF HUNGER AND HARDSHIP A GREAT PRINCIPLE OF POLITICAL JUSTICE WAS VINDICATED."

The medal ribbons were in the WSPU colours of green white and purple.

One of her brothers was the barrister J. E. Ansell, who later published a history of the family name. It was to his children that Gertrude Ansell left her small estate. She died at the General Hospital in Saffron Walden on 7 March 1932 following an operation for gallstones.
