= George Frederick Ansell =

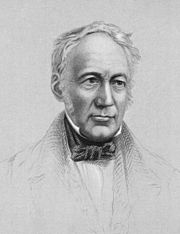
George Frederick Ansell

George Frederick Ansell (4 March 1826 – 21 December 1880) was an English scientific inventor, chemist and assayer, and author of a standard work on the Royal Mint.

== Biography ==
Ansell was born at Carshalton on 4 March 1826. He was the 5th child and second son to Robert and Sarah Ansell. Robert was a wealthy mill owner from Carshalton and his family all were wealthy to some extent, with the Ansell family well known in the district. George was apprenticed for four years to a surgeon, and studied medicine with the intention of adopting a medical life as his profession, but abandoned it for chemistry. After undergoing a course of instruction at the Royal College of Chemistry, he became an assistant to August Wilhelm Hofmann at the Royal School of Mines. In 1854, he gave lectures in chemistry at the Panopticon in Leicester Square, London, but that institution did not last long, and Ansell accepted from Thomas Graham, in November 1856, a situation in the Royal Mint.

In 1859, the Royal Mint rejected a batch of gold that was found to be too brittle for the minting of gold sovereigns. Analysis revealed the presence of small amounts of antimony, arsenic and lead. With Ansell's background in chemistry, he persuaded the Royal Mint to allow him to experiment with the alloy and was ultimately able to produce 167,539 gold sovereigns. The only identifying feature to single out an 'Ansell' sovereign is the presence of an additional line on the ribbon, used to tie back Victoria's hair. Today, only 15 - 25 examples of this coin are known to exist and are therefore extremely rare & collectable.

He remained at the Royal Mint for more than ten years, when differences of opinion between him and its chiefs led to the loss of his position. A contemporary history suggests his criticisms influenced the Coinage Act 1870. After his retirement, and until his death on 21 December 1880, he practised as an analyst.

Ansell devoted much attention to the dangers arising from firedamp in collieries, and made a valuable series of experiments on the subject in the Ince Hall colliery near Wigan. The ‘firedamp indicator’, which he subsequently patented, was adopted with considerable success in many of the collieries on the continent. For the cyclopædia of Charles Tomlinson he wrote a treatise on coining — one hundred copies of which were struck off for private circulation — and his work on the Royal Mint was an amplification of this article. This volume first appeared in 1870, and was reissued in the next year; its popularity was somewhat marred by the introduction of the narrative of his quarrels with his colleagues in the office, but it contained much information not to be found elsewhere. Several articles on the subjects in which he took most interest were contributed by him to the seventh edition of Andrew Ure's ‘Dictionary of Arts’.

His daughter Gertrude Mary Ansell was a noted suffragette and animal rights activist.

== Publications ==
- The Royal Mint: its working, conduct, and operations, fully and practically explained, 1870
