= Great Pilgrimage =

Suffrage march of 1913

- Part of first-wave feminism
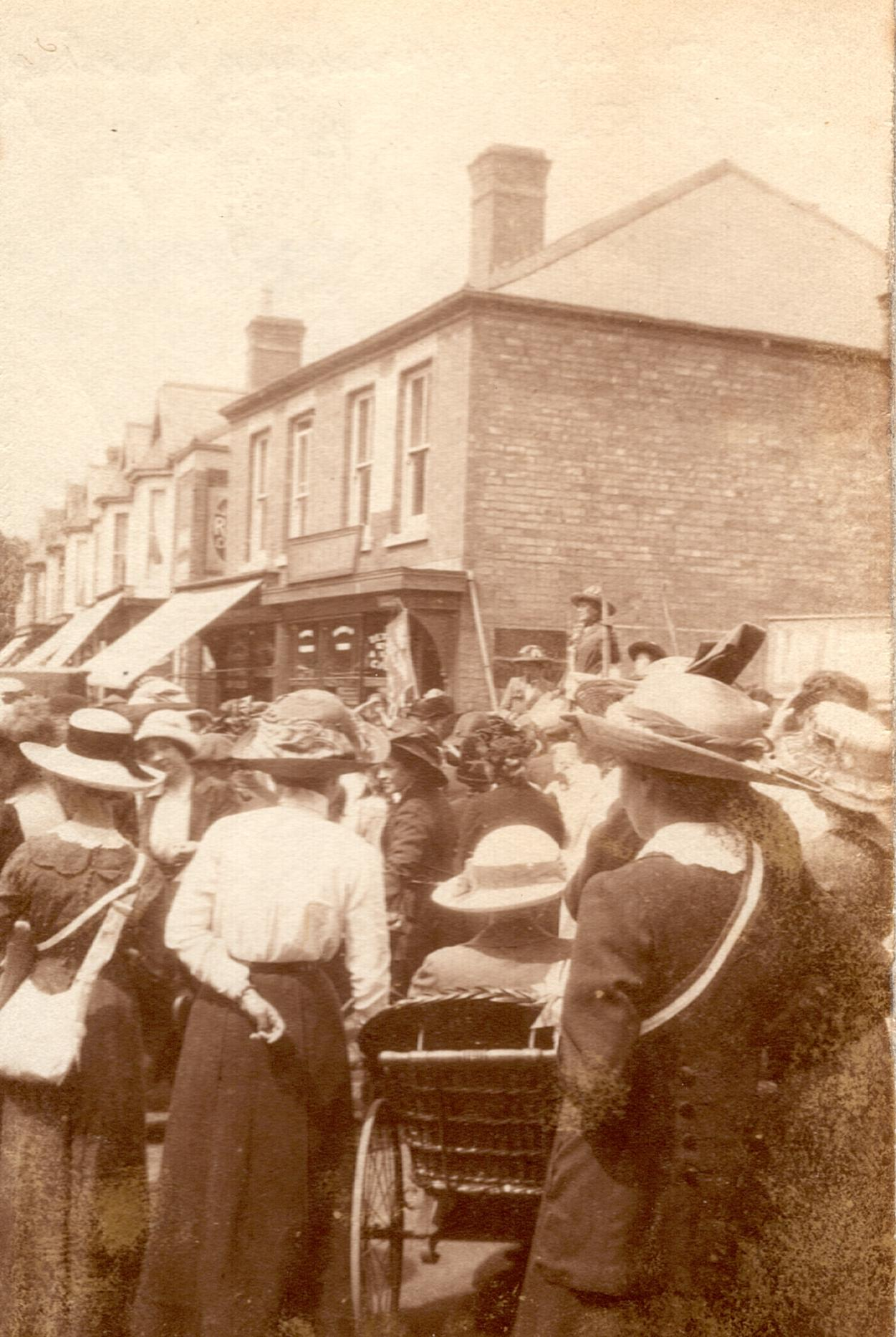
- Katherine Harley addresses a meeting at Olton during the Great Pilgrimage.
- Date: 18 June – 26 July 1913
- Location: Marchers converged on Hyde Park, London, England; 51.508611°N 0.163611°W
- Caused by: Fight for women's suffrage
- Methods: Demonstrations, marches

Parties
National Union of Women's Suffrage Societies (NUWSS)	Liberal government, 1905–1915

Lead figures
Millicent Fawcett (NUWSS)	Prime Minister H. H. Asquith

The Great Pilgrimage of 1913 was a march in Britain by suffragists campaigning nonviolently for women's suffrage, organised by the National Union of Women's Suffrage Societies (NUWSS). Women marched to London from all around England and Wales and 50,000 attended a rally in Hyde Park.

== Background ==
The idea for the march was first put forward by Katherine Harley at an NUWSS subcommittee meeting in London on 17 April 1913. Plans were rapidly drawn up, and publicised through the NUWSS newsletter Common Cause, for six routes along which marchers would converge on London for a rally in Hyde Park on 26 July 1913. These were named the Great North Route (from Newcastle and East Anglia); the Watling Street Route (from Carlisle, Manchester and north Wales); the West Country Route (from Land's End and south Wales); the Bournemouth Route; the Portsmouth Route; and the Kentish Pilgrim Way.

== March ==
The first marchers set off on 18 June, allowing six weeks to reach London from Carlisle and Newcastle. Each contingent was preceded by banners declaring the march to be law-abiding and non-militant, clarifying the stance of the NUWSS compared to the militancy of the WSPU. Women of all classes joined the march, including Lady Rochdale (wife of George Kemp, 1st Baron Rochdale), who marched from Carlisle to London and Scottish suffragist and politician, Helen Fraser, who marched with the Welsh contingent including the Liberal Party politician, Aneurin Williams.

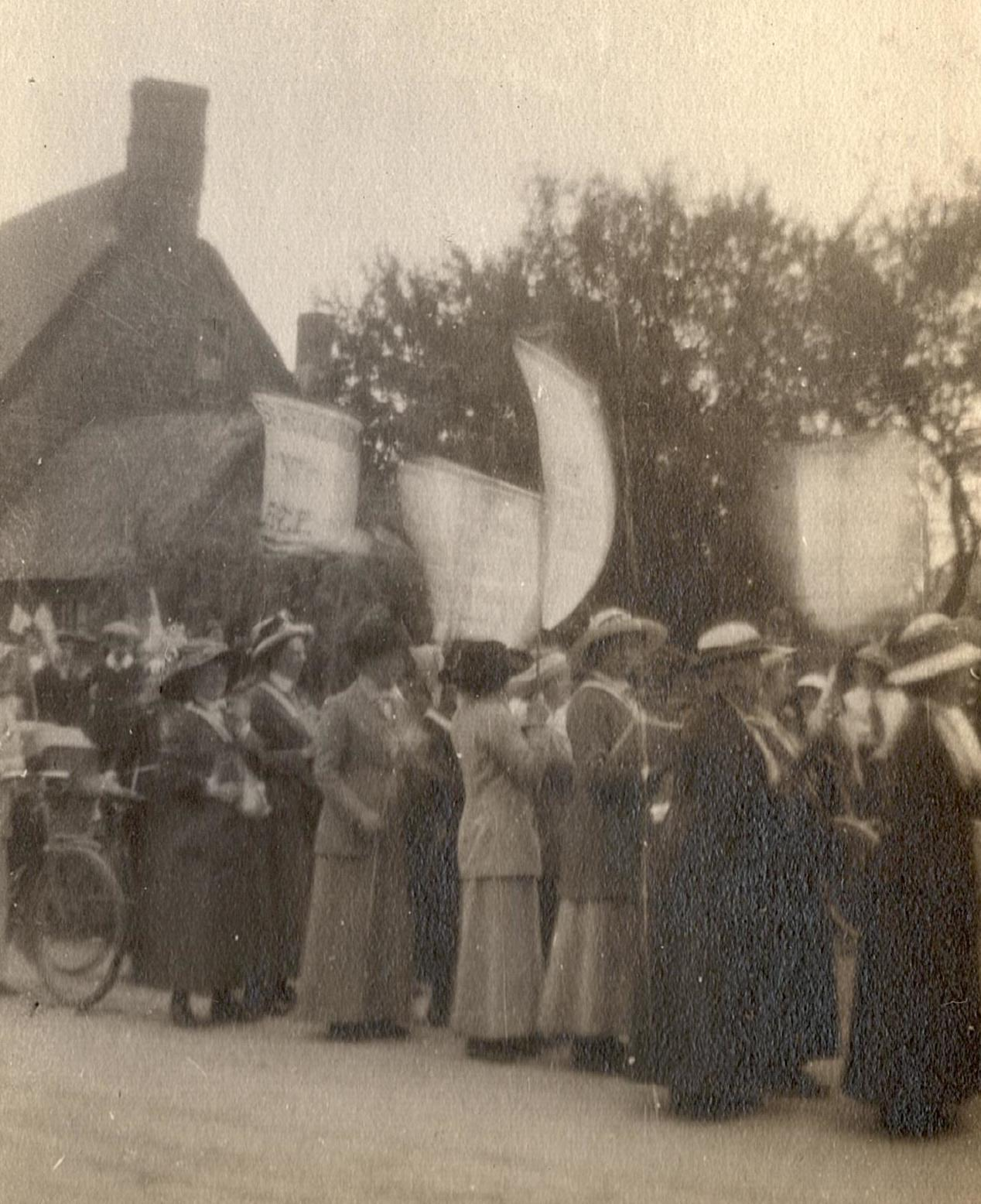
The procession leaving Drayton for Banbury

The march was organised in great detail. Advance information provided to marchers included a "village-by-village itinerary" with details about accommodation and facilities. A single piece of luggage per person would be transported, there were daily roll calls, and marchers were asked to wear rosettes in green, white and red - not the purple of the suffragettes. Some marchers brought horse-drawn caravans to accommodate themselves en route, while others stayed with local supporters or were found other accommodation. Marchers were welcome to join the pilgrimage for as long as they could: while some women marched for six weeks others could only spare a shorter time.

Public meetings were organised along the routes of the march, and in some cases the women were met with violence from hostile locals, as at Ripon where they were attacked by drunks celebrating the local agricultural show, and at Thame where an attempt was made to burn one of the marchers' caravans while they slept in it.

== Rally ==
On Saturday, 26 July, the marchers and others converged on Hyde Park for their rally. They assembled at pre-arranged points to march to the park, where 78 speakers addressed the crowd from 19 platforms, one for each federation within the NUWSS. At 6pm a vote was taken at each platform, and those present unanimously passed the motion "That this meeting demands a Government measure for the enfranchisement of women".

== Impact ==
A 2025 study found that "proximity to the Pilgrimage increased women’s registration in local elections."

== Centennial commemoration ==
In 2013 a series of walks were held to commemorate the centenary of the pilgrimage. Playwright Natalie McGrath's play Oxygen, which was inspired by the 1913 march, was performed by the arts organisation Dreadnought South West at venues along the march route.

== See also ==
- Mud March, 1907 suffrage procession in London
- Women's Sunday, 1908 suffrage march and rally in London
- Women's Coronation Procession, 1911 suffrage march in London
- Suffrage Hikes, 1912 to 1914 in the US
- Woman Suffrage Procession, 1913 suffrage march in Washington, D.C.
- Silent Sentinels, 1917 to 1919 protest in Washington, D.C.
- Selma to Montgomery march, 1965 suffrage march in the US
