= Jane de Gay =

British academic

Jane de Gay is a British academic, lecturer, Virginia Woolf scholar and current Director of Ministry at Swansea & Brecon Diocese. De Gay's works on Woolf include a series of articles and a 2006 book, Virginia Woolf's Novels and the Literary Past, published by Edinburgh University Press. Her work has been recognised by the Virginia Woolf Society of Great Britain. She has co-edited four books on gender and theatre, including Languages of Theatre Shaped by Women (with Lizbeth Goodman).

De Gay is also an Anglican priest. In 2023 she was appointed as honorary Associate Priest and Lecturer at Leeds Minster.

== Academia ==
She is Professor of English Literature and co-director of the Leeds Centre for Victorian Studies at Leeds Trinity University.

== Quotes ==
- “The invitation is a great honour, and I will be following in the footsteps of distinguished Woolf scholars Dame Gillian Beer and the late Professor Julia Briggs. I continue to work on Woolf, and the Virginia Woolf Birthday Lecture will draw on my new research into Woolf and Spirituality.”

== Publications ==
- Virginia Woolf's Novels and the Literary Past (2006) ISBN 978-0-7486-2349-5; Paperback (2007) ISBN 978-0-7486-3302-9
