= 1906 WSPU march =

Women's suffrage protest in London, England

- Part of first-wave feminism
- Date: 19 February 1906; 120 years ago
- Location: House of Commons, England; 51°29′59.6″N 0°07′28.8″W
- Caused by: Fight for women's suffrage
- Methods: Demonstrations, marches, hectoring politicians
- Result: 300–400 women march to the House of Commons

Parties
Women's Social and Political Union (WSPU)	Liberal government, 1905–1915

Lead figures
Emmeline Pankhurst (WSPU)	Prime Minister Henry Campbell-Bannerman
- Followed by: Mud March (organized by the NUWSS)

The 1906 WSPU march on 19 February 1906 was the first march held in London to demand the right to vote for women in the United Kingdom. Organized by Sylvia Pankhurst and Annie Kenney of the Women's Social and Political Union (WSPU), the event saw around 300–400 women march through central London to the House of Commons. It was held to coincide with the King's Speech and the opening of Parliament.

Two hundred women from Bow, Bromley, Canning Town and Poplar in the East End marched to Caxton Hall, near the Commons, from St James's Park tube station. There, Emmeline Pankhurst heard there was no mention of votes for women in the King's Speech and led the women on another march to the Commons Strangers' Entrance. Over the following two hours, the women were allowed to enter in groups of 20 to lobby their MPs. The Daily Mirror reported the event on page 5: "Voteless Women. 3,000 [sic] Demonstrators March Behind a Red Banner. Smiling but Earnest."

Emmeline Pankhurst saw the march as the beginning of a militant women's suffrage movement. The women "were awake at last", she wrote. "They were prepared to do something that women had never done before—fight for themselves. Women had always fought for men, and for their children. Now they were ready to fight for their own human rights. Our militant movement was established."

== Works cited ==
- Kelly, Katherine E. (2004). "Seeing through Spectacles: The Woman Suffrage Movement and London Newspapers, 1906–13". European Journal of Women's Studies. 11 (3): 327–353. doi:10.1177/1350506804044466. S2CID 143436264.
- Pankhurst, Emmeline (1914). My Own Story. London: Eveleigh Nash.
- Purvis, June (2002). Emmeline Pankhurst: A Biography. London and New York: Routledge.
- Van Wingerden, Sophia A. (1999). The Women's Suffrage Movement in Britain, 1866–1928. New York: Palgrave Macmillan.
