= Lisa Tickner =

British art historian

Lisa Tickner FBA (born 21 December 1944) is a British art historian. She has taught at Middlesex University (where she is now Emeritus Professor), Northwestern University, and the Courtauld Institute of Art (where she is now Honorary Professor). In 2008 she was elected a Fellow of the British Academy.

Tickner's work focuses on the history of modern art in Britain, and on feminist and theoretical approaches to the history of art. In 1979 she was one of the founders of BLOCK magazine. Her first book, The Spectacle of Women (1987), looked at the imagery of the Suffragette movement in Britain, and has been seen as an early model for visual culture studies. Her second book, Modern Life and Modern Subjects (2000), was described on publication as 'simply the best book yet written by an art historian about British modernism'.

== Early life ==
Tickner initially studied Fine Art at the Hornsey School of Art, but was encouraged to pursue art history by Nikolaus Pevsner. She completed a PhD on the arts and crafts movement in 1970.

== Career ==
In the 1970s Tickner was involved with the Women's Art History Collective in a way that influenced her scholarship. Her paper "The Body Politic: Female Sexuality and Women Artists Since 1970", presented at the 1977 AAH conference, was published in the second issue of the newly formed journal Art History, and led to the resignation of one of the members of the journal's editorial board.
