= Mildred Mansel =

19th- and 20th-century British suffragette

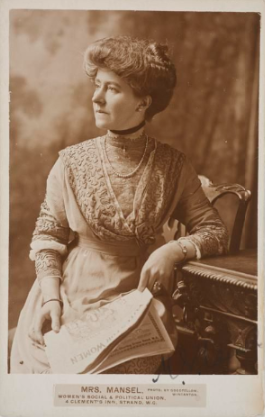
- Mansel on a WSPU postcard
- Born: 1868; Roehampton, Surrey, England
- Died: 11 March 1942 (aged 73–74); Binsted, Arundel, Sussex, England
- Children: 3
- Parent(s): Arthur Guest; Adeline Chapman
- Relatives: Lady Charlotte Guest (grandmother); Ivor Guest, 1st Viscount Wimborne (cousin)

Mildred Ella Mansel (née Guest, c. 1868 – 11 March 1942) was a British suffragette and organiser for the Women’s Social and Political Union (WSPU) in Bath.

== Family ==
Mansel was born in 1868 in Roehampton, Surrey. Her parents were the conservative politician Arthur Guest (1841–1898) and suffragist Adeline Chapman (1847–1931). Her mother was a member of the Central Society for Women's Suffrage and the Women's Tax Resistance League. She had a brother, Arthur Rhuvon Guest. Her family were well connected in society, as Mansel’s grandmother was the aristocrat and linguist Lady Charlotte Guest (1812–1895) and her first cousin was Ivor Churchill Guest, 1st Viscount Wimborne (1873–1939), member of Parliament for Cardiff and the Liberal Party chief whip.

She married Colonel John Delalynde Mansel of Bayford Lodge, Wincanton in 1888. They had three children, two daughters and a son. Her daughter Juliet Mansel (born 1898) lived with the Catholic religious writer Baron Friedrich von Hügel and his wife, Mary Catherine Herbert, while she attended boarding school in High Wycombe and was considered a fourth daughter by von Hügel. During World War I, both her daughters Marcia and Juliet became nurses.

== Activism ==
=== Suffrage ===
Mansel became a campaigner for women's enfranchisement and was a member of the WSPU by 1909. During the Bill of Rights March on 29 June 1909, Mansel was arrested with Evelina Haverfield and Emmeline Pankhurst as they had tried to break into the House of Commons and present a petition to Herbert Asquith, the Prime Minister.

Mansel became an organiser of the Bath WSPU branch in 1910 and supported the establishment of a new branch in Yeovil. When Grace Roe was sent to Ipswich to recruit for the WSPU and set up a branch, she invited Mansel and Marie Brackenbury to support her there.

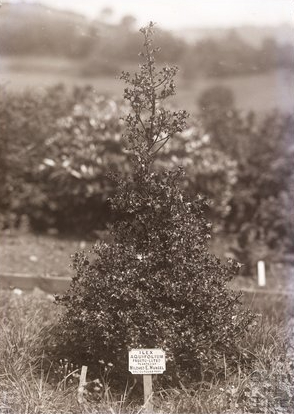
Mary Blathwayt's dad's photo of the Fructu-Luteo Holly planted on 21 October 1910 by Mansel

On 21 October 1910, Mansel was invited to plant a tree at Eagle House, known as "suffragette's rest". She planted an Ilex Aquifolium Fructu-Luteo Holly and the surviving plaque is held in the collection of the Roman Baths Museum. She became friends with Mary Blathwayt of Eagle House, who helped Mansel to balance the local WPSU accounts.

In 1911, Mansel participated in the suffragette boycott of the 1911 census and hired 12 Lansdowne Crescent in Bath to be used by the 35 local census evaders, including Blathwayt. She also participated in an 'at home' meeting in the home of Mary Morris in preparation for a London Procession, and gave a speech in support of women's suffrage with Annie Kenney at Melksham Town Hall.

Mansel was arrested again in November 1911 in Wales and was sentenced to a week in prison. Mansell was sent to Holloway Prison for a week after an action where she broke windows at the War Office, London.

After the failure of the Conciliation Bill on 19 February 1912, Mansel wrote in WSPU newspaper Votes for Women that the bill's fate was "an object-lesson" for women about what they could expect from "a man-made Parliament responsible to men only."

From 1913 Mansel was put in charge of coordinating the movement of suffragettes between safe houses to shelter them after being released from prison under the "Cat and Mouse Act." Due to her familial connection with Ivor Guest she was considered "untouchable". As part of this role, she rented a flat in London for Grace Roe. Also during 1913, Mansel visited her friend Christabel Pankhurst in Paris, France.

In 1914, Mansel said to a group of suffrage supporters: “Something has been said about our Union being “underground. Does this meeting look as though we were underground? We are underground, and overground, and everywhere.

== Poverty ==
Mansel is considered as the possible author of the 1911 book Five Months in a London Hospital, which recounted poverty and medical treatment in London's poor areas.

== Later life ==
Mansel attended a reunion dinner on 11 February 1928 to celebrate Equal Franchise, which was also attended by Nina Boyle, Teresa Billington-Greig, Edith How-Martyn, Muriel Matters, Anna Munro, Emmeline Pethwick-Lawrence and Daisy Solomon.

When Emmeline Pankhurst died on 14 June 1928, Mansel was one of her pallbearers, alongside other former suffragettes Georgiana Brackenbury, Marie Brackenbury, Marion Wallace Dunlop, Harriet Kerr, Kitty Marshall, Rosamund Massy, Marie Naylor, Ada Wright and Barbara Wylie.

Mansel founded the Mid Somerset Musical Competitive Festival in 1934.

She died in 1942 in Binsted, Arundel, Sussex.
