= Rosamund Massy =

English suffragette (1870–1947)

- detail from 1913 WSPU postcard by Rita Martin
- Born: 1870; London, Middlesex, England
- Died: 1947 (aged 76–77)

Rosamund Nora Massy (1870–1947) was an English suffragette and a "fierce woman". She was one of three women who organised the Emmeline and Christabel Pankhurst Memorial, and was awarded the Hunger Strike Medal.

== Family ==
Rosamund Massy was born in London in 1870, the daughter of Sir Casey Knywett and Lady Knyvett. Her mother was also a prominent suffragette. She married Percy Hugh Hamon Massy, an officer of the 6th Dragoon Guards; her husband was supportive of her activism. They had one daughter.

== Activism ==
She joined the Women's Suffrage movement around 1908 and had become a paid organiser of the Women's Social and Political Union (WSPU) by the following year.

In 1909. Massy helped Edith Rigby gate-crash a meeting featuring Winston Churchill in Preston and threw a stone through the window of the post office. It was wrapped in paper containing the statement: 'Message to Mr Winston Churchill: This stone through your post office window is to remind you of your broken promises to the Suffragists of Manchester and Dundee.’ She was arrested and pleaded guilty to causing £2 damage. She was imprisoned for the first time and went on an hunger-strike. After a week her mother paid the fine and she was released. She was arrested another three times and imprisoned again in 1910 for one month, after she had joined the Black Friday event.

In 1913, together with her mother, she enquired with Sir William Byrne at the Home Office about the condition of Emmeline Pankhurst who was imprisoned in Holloway Prison. The impression of Sir Byrne was that Lady Knyvett was a dear old lady and Massy a fierce woman. Lady Knyvett had given money to the WSPU while Massy warned of what she thought might happen if Pankhurst died in prison. Massy later supported Pankhurst in her election campaigns.

== Pankhurst's funeral and memorials ==
Emmeline Pankhurst died on 14 June 1928, Massy was one of her pallbearers, alongside other former suffragettes Georgiana Brackenbury, Marie Brackenbury, Marion Wallace Dunlop, Harriet Kerr, Mildred Mansel, Kitty Marshall, Marie Naylor, Ada Wright and Barbara Wylie.

Kitty Marshall, Margaret, Lady Rhondda and Massy decided to arrange and fundraise for Pankhurst's memorials, with Massy serving as the fund's secretary. They raised money for her gravestone in Brompton Cemetery and a statue of her outside the House of Commons (which she had frequently been stopped from entering). They also raised money to buy the painting that had been made by fellow suffragette Georgina Brackenbury so that it could be given to the National Portrait Gallery.

Massy's prison badge and Hunger Strike Medal were placed in a casket in the plinth of Emmeline Pankhurst's statue in the Victoria Tower Gardens. It was unveiled by Stanley Baldwin in 1930.
