= Hunger Strike Medal =

Medal awarded to British suffragettes

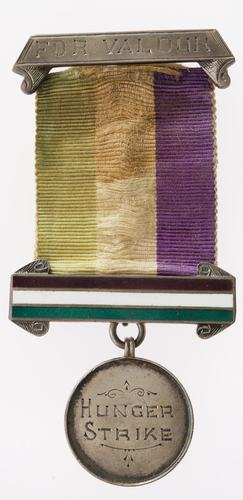
- Medal awarded to Myra Sadd Brown in 1912

Awarded by Women's Social and Political Union
- Established: August 1909
- Ribbon: Green, White, Purple
- Motto: For Valour
- Criteria: Awarded to suffragette prisoners who had gone on hunger strike during their imprisonment.
- Grades: Force-feeding – additional striped enamel bar

Statistics
- Total inductees: 81 known

The Hunger Strike Medal was a silver medal awarded between August 1909 and 1914 to suffragette prisoners by the leadership of the Women's Social and Political Union (WSPU). During their imprisonment, many went on hunger strike while serving their sentences in the prisons of the United Kingdom for acts of militancy in their campaign for women's suffrage. Many women were force-fed and their individual medals were created to reflect this.

The WSPU awarded a range of military-style campaign medals to raise morale and encourage continued loyalty and commitment to the cause. The Hunger Strike Medals were designed by Sylvia Pankhurst and first presented by the leadership of the WSPU at a ceremony in early August 1909 to women who had gone on hunger strike while serving a prison sentence. Later the medals would be presented at a breakfast reception on a woman's release from prison.

== Background ==
On 5 July 1909, suffragette Marion Wallace Dunlop began her hunger strike in Holloway Prison. She had been sentenced to one month for stenciling a message from the Bill of Rights on the wall of the House of Commons. The prison authorities considered her a criminal prisoner whereas she viewed herself as a political prisoner and began her strike in objection to this classification. Her strike lasted 91 hours, ending only because the prison released her to avoid her death.

The hunger strike was Wallace Dunlop's idea and she did it without informing the leadership of the WSPU. Many others quickly imitated her.

== Description ==
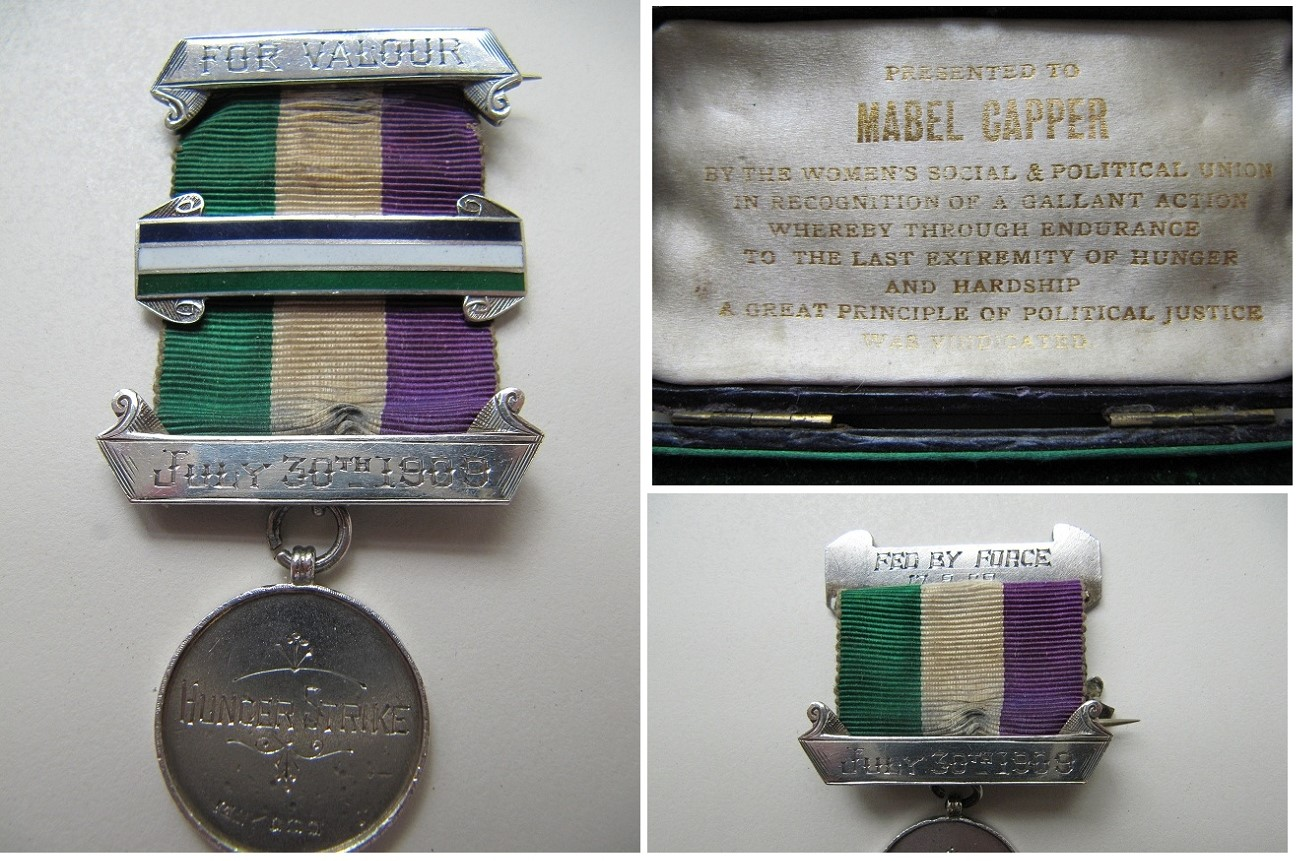
Medal in its presentation case with silver bar for a hunger strike and enamel bar for force-feeding awarded by the WSPU to Mabel Capper

The round and hallmarked silver medals hang on a length of ribbon in the purple, white and green colours of the WSPU. This hangs from a silver pin bar engraved with For Valour, in imitation of the inscription found on the Victoria Cross. The front of the medal is inscribed Hunger Strike, while the reverse is engraved with the recipient's name surrounded by a laurel wreath. The medals were made by Toye & Co. and their manufacture cost the WSPU £1.00 each.

The silver bars on the medal were awarded for periods of hunger strike and are engraved on the reverse with the date that the recipient was arrested leading to a hunger strike. The enamelled purple, white and green bars for force-feeding are similarly engraved on the reverse.

The sculptor Edith Downing's medal bar is engraved with Fed by Force 1/3/12 – the date that she was imprisoned which subsequently led to her hunger strike and forcible feeding. The medals could be issued with more than one bar representing multiple hunger strikes or force-feeding.

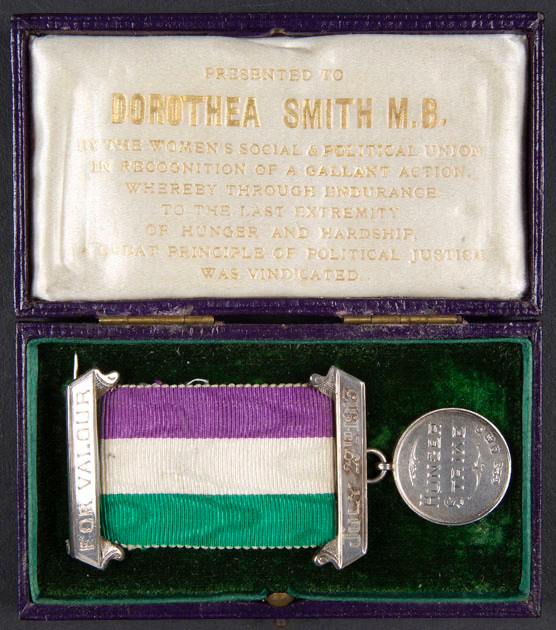
Dorothea Chalmers Smith's Hunger Strike Medal and Case

== Presentation ==
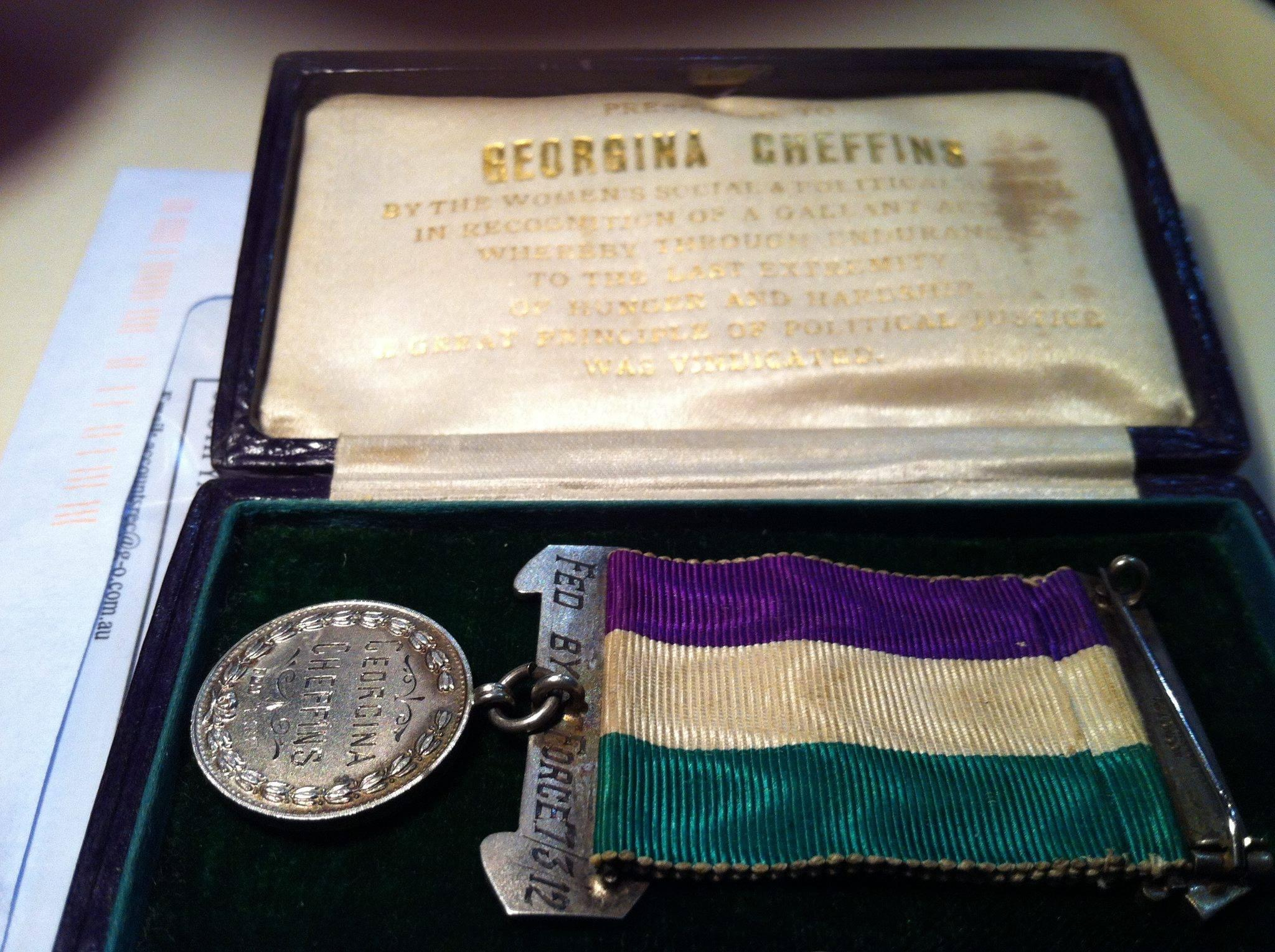
Hunger Strike Medal awarded to Georgina Fanny Cheffins

Each Hunger Strike Medal was presented in a purple box with a green velvet lining. A piece of white silk was fitted inside the lid which was printed in gold with the dedication: "Presented to [name] by the Women's Social and Political Union in recognition of a gallant action, whereby through endurance to the last extremity of hunger and hardship a great principle of political justice was vindicated."

== Surviving medals ==
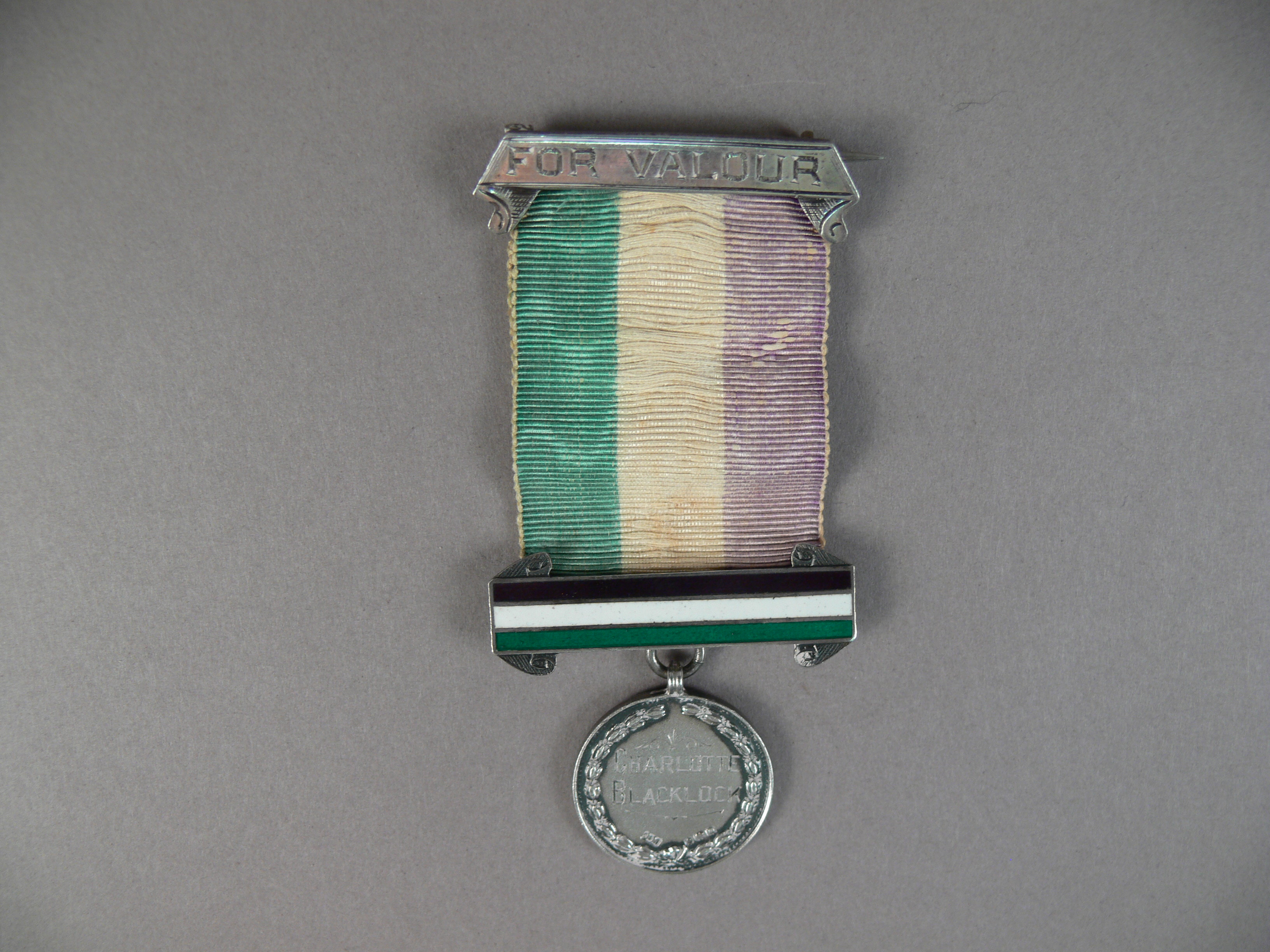
Charlotte Blacklock's Hunger Strike Medal, Museum of Australian Democracy collection

The Museum of London holds the medal awarded to the suffragette leader Emmeline Pankhurst who went on hunger strike during a two-month prison sentence in 1912 for throwing a stone at a window of 10 Downing Street.

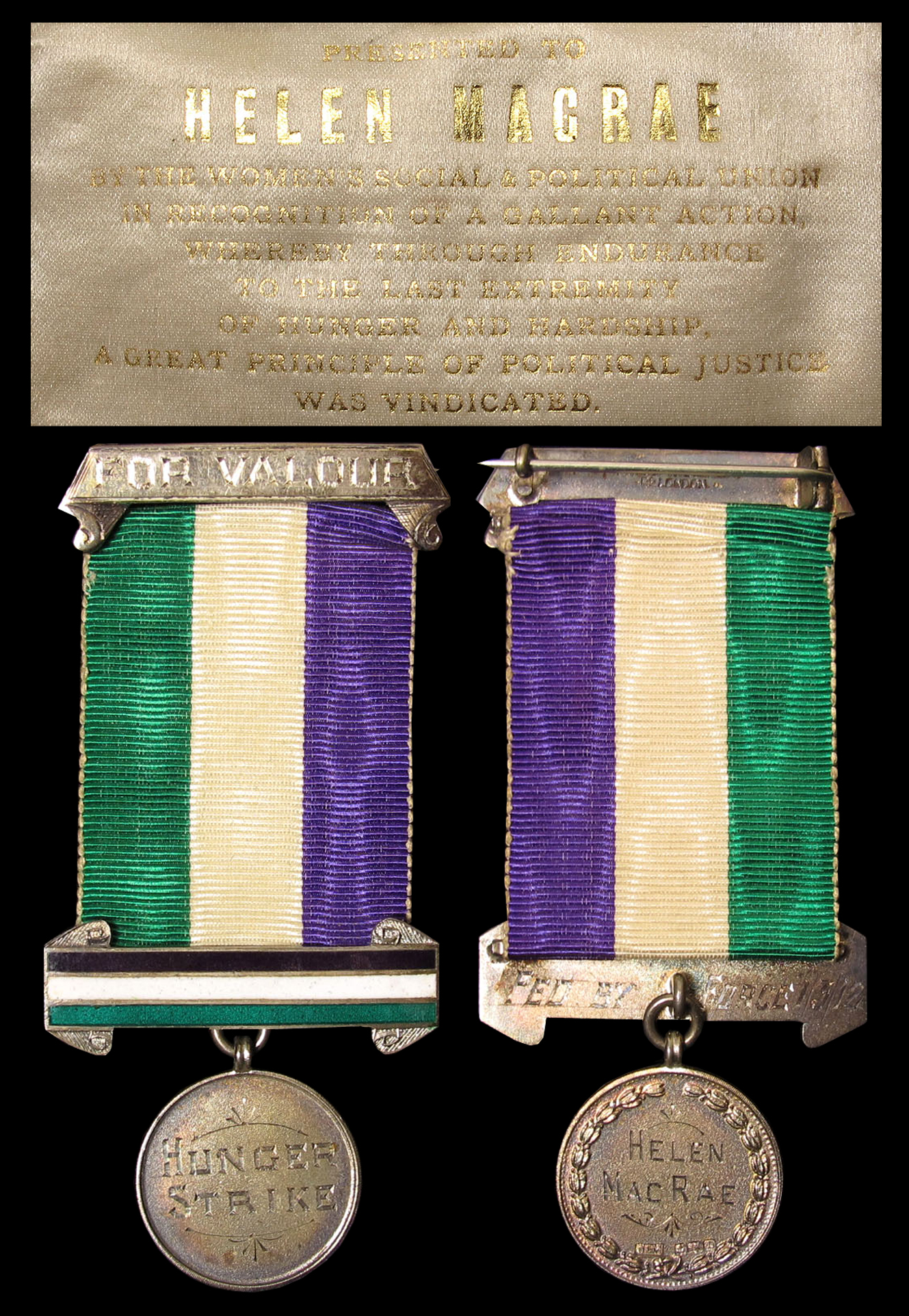
Helen MacRae's Hunger Strike Medal, auctioned by Lockdales Auctioneers in 2015. Author: Chris Elmy

Helen MacRae's Hunger Strike Medal in its case was auctioned in 2015 to a private collector, for £12,300. Lockdales Auctioneers' auction manager, James Sadler, said "these are among the most historically important items we have ever dealt with."

A medal found in a drawer awarded to suffragette Elsie Wolff Van Sandau who was arrested for smashing a window in Covent Garden on 4 March 1912 and who went on hunger strike in prison was sold at auction in 2019 for £12,500. A medal belonging to suffragette Selina Martin, auctioned in Nottingham in 2019 and expected to fetch £15,000–20,000, was bought by the National Gallery of Victoria for £27,000.

The Museum of New Zealand Te Papa Tongarewa purchased Frances Parker's medal in 2016.

The Museum of Australian Democracy holds the medal awarded to Charlotte Blacklock. The medal awarded to Kate Williams Evans was sold at auction as part of a collection in 2018 which realised £48,640. It is now in the collection of Amgueddfa Cymru – Museum Wales.

Rosamund Massy's medal and Holloway brooch are buried inside the plinth of the statue of Emmeline Pankhurst in London.

In September 2023, Glasgow Women's Library decided to buy Maud Joachim's medal as it was awarded for the first WSPU hunger strike in Scotland. The money-raising campaign was successful and it was brought back to the library in October.

== In popular culture ==
The BBC television series Call the Midwife featured an episode with an elderly suffragette played by Annette Crosbie who gifted her Hunger Strike Medal to one of the nurses who cared for her.

== Medal recipients ==
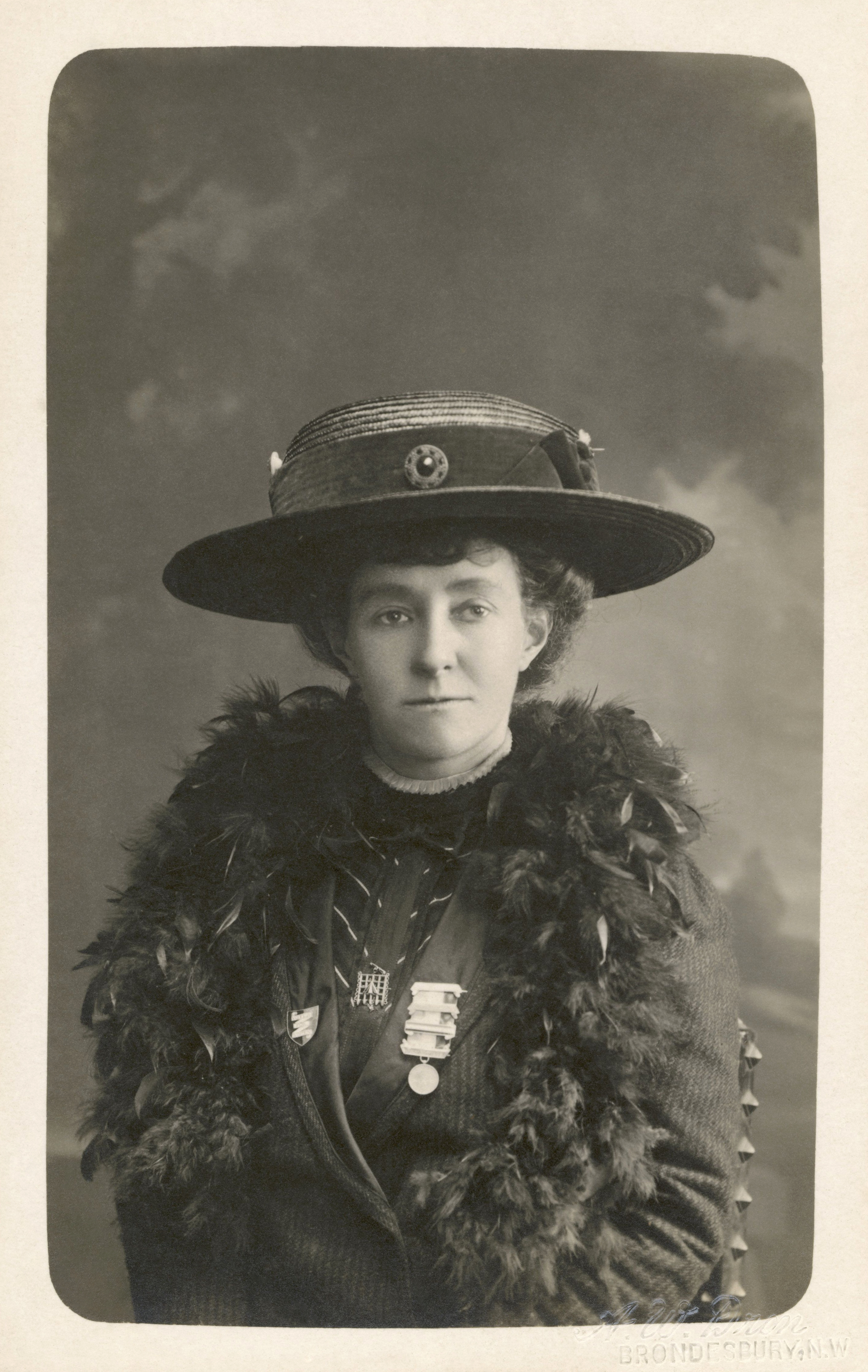
Emily Davison wearing her Hunger Strike Medal and Holloway brooch c. 1910–1912

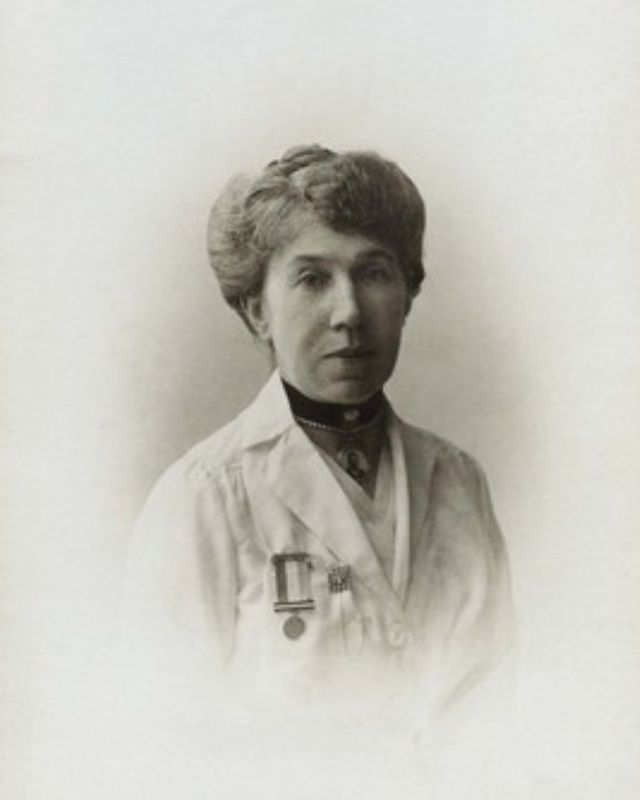
Janie Terrero wearing her Hunger Strike Medal and Holloway brooch c. 1912

As of October 2025 there are 91 known medal recipients. If known, this list also contains the dates of their arrest(s) as inscribed on their medals.

- Mary Ann Aldham
- Mary Sophia Allen
- Laura Ainsworth
- Helen Archdale – 19 October 1909
- Charlotte Blacklock
- Violet Bland
- Myra Sadd Brown
- Constance Bryer
- Evaline Hilda Burkitt
- Lucy Burns
- Leila Gertrude Garcias de Cadiz
- Kate E. Teresa Cardro
- Mabel Capper – 30 July 1909
- Eileen Mary Casey
- Joan Cather – 4 March 1912
- Grace Chappelow – 4 September 1909
- Georgina Fanny Cheffins
- Leonora Cohen
- Constance Collier
- Jessie Landale Cumberland – 21 May 1914
- Alice Davies
- Emily Davison
- Violet Mary Doudney
- Caroline Lowder Downing
- Edith Downing
- Flora Drummond
- Elsie Duval
- Norah Elam – 28 July
- Kate Williams Evans – 4 March 1912
- Caprina Fahey – 14 March 1914
- Theresa Garnett
- Ellison Scotland Gibb
- Margaret Skirving Gibb
- Nellie Godfrey
- Joan Lavender Bailie Guthrie
- Florence Haig
- Nellie Hall – 21 July 1913
- Alice Hawkins – 4 September 1909
- Gladys Mary Hazel
- Georgina Healiss
- Beth Hesmondhalgh
- Mary Ann Hilliard
- Anna Hutchinson
- Elsie Howey
- Maud Joachim – 19 October 1909, 1 March 1912
- Ellen Isabel Jones
- Violet Jones – 4 [illegible] 1909, 8 December 1909
- Winifred Jones (suffragette)
- Clara Lambert
- Laura Geraldine Lennox
- Lilian Lenton
- Anna Lewis – 10 February 1914
- Ethel Lewis
- Louise Lilley
- Gertrude Golda Lowy
- Constance Lytton – 9 October 1909
- Margaret Macfarlane
- Helen MacRae
- Grace Marcon – 26 October 1913
- Kitty Marion
- Charlotte Marsh
- Katherine "Kitty" Marshall
- Selina Martin – 20 August 1909
- Rosamund Massy
- Frances McPhun
- Margaret McPhun
- Lillian Metge – 10 August 1914
- Ethel Moorhead – 29 August 1912, 29 November 1912, 29 January 1913, 15 October 1913
- Edith New
- Marie du Sautoy Newby – 4 March 1912
- Frances Outerbridge
- Emmeline Pankhurst – 1 March 1912
- Frances Parker
- Alice Paul
- Pleasance Pendred
- Mary Phillips
- Mary Richardson
- Edith Rigby
- Rona Robinson – 20 August 1909, 15 October 1909
- Grace Roe
- Bertha Ryland
- Arabella Scott
- Genie Sheppard
- Dorothea Chalmers Smith
- Geraldine Stevenson
- Grace Cameron Swan
- Janie Terrero
- Catherine Tolson – 4 September 1909
- Leonora Tyson
- Elsie Wolff Van Sandau – 4 March 1912
- Marion Wallace Dunlop
- Olive Grace Walton
- Helen Kirkpatrick Watts
- Olive Wharry
- Gertrude Wilkinson
- Agnes Wilson
- Laetitia Withall

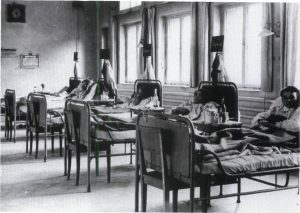
Suffragettes on hunger strike in 1909 – photo by Elin Wagner

=== Likely medal recipients ===
These women are WSPU hunger strikers who therefore meet the conditions to have been awarded a medal but the evidence of their medals has yet to be located.

- Violet Aitken
- Janie Allan
- Doreen Allen
- Gertrude Ansell
- Sarah Jane Baines
- Elizabeth Baker
- Ellen Barnwell
- Edith Marian Begbie
- Olive Beamish
- Sarah Benett
- Rosa May Billinghurst
- Eugenie Bouvier
- Janet Boyd
- Grace Mary Branson
- Bertha Brewster
- Amy Bull
- Rosalind Garcias de Cadiz
- Mary Jane Clarke
- Meg Connery
- Catherine Corbett
- Margaret Cousins
- Helen Crawfurd
- Lillian Dove-Willcox
- Maude Edwards
- Zelie Emerson
- Dorothy Evans
- Lara Evans (Note: Potentially the same woman.)
- Laura Evans
- Lettice Floyd
- Katharine Gatty
- Mary Gawthorpe
- Clara Giveen
- Frances Gordon
- Margaret Haig Thomas
- Edith Hudson
- May R. Jones
- Annie Kenney
- Kitty Kenney
- Alice Stewart Ker (Note: Crawford states it's unclear if force-feeding or another illness was the reason for her release.)
- Harriet Kerr
- Agnes Lake
- Mary Leigh
- Kate Lilley
- Florence Macfarlane
- Lizzie Mckenzie
- Lillias Tait Mitchell
- Adela Pankhurst
- Sylvia Pankhurst
- Dorothy Pethick
- Emmeline Pethick-Lawrence
- Ellen Pitfield
- Isabella Potbury
- Gladys Roberts
- Margaret Rowlatt
- Beatrice Sanders
- Alice Maud Shipley
- Jane Short
- Helen Margaret Spanton
- Dora Spong
- Florence Spong
- Ella Stevenson
- Elizabeth Thomson
- Helen Tolson
- Vera Wentworth
- Annie Williams
- Sarah Winstedt
- Patricia Woodlock
- Ada Wright

== See also ==
- Holloway banner
- Holloway brooch
- Suffrage jewellery
- The Suffragette Handkerchief
