= Jane Murphy =

Jane Murphy may refer to:

- Jane Murphy, Irish suffragette was one of the Cadiz sisters
- Jane Hamsher (born 1959), US film producer, author, and blogger, born Jane Murphy

== See also ==
- Murphy (surname)
