= Marie Naylor =

British artist and militant suffragette (1856–1940)

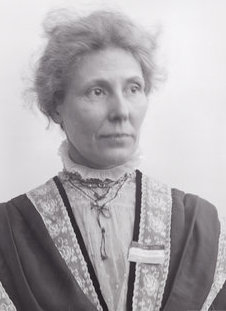
- Naylor in 1909
- Born: 1856; London, England
- Died: 1940 (aged 83–84); Richmond, England
- Cause of death: Air raid
- Other name: Mary Jane
- Occupation: Artist
- Known for: Militant suffragette

Marie Naylor (1856–1940) was a British artist and militant suffragette.

== Life ==
Naylor was born in London, England, in 1856. She studied art and had a self portrait exhibited at the Royal Academy in 1890, which was commented on by the Illustrated London News.. In all, she exhibited six times at Royal Academy exhibitions, between the years 1886 and 1900. During this time she also studied in Paris, where she exhibited in various exhibitions, including a one-woman exhibition at Galerie Dosbourg in 1898 before returning to the UK where she took an interest in women's suffrage.

In 1907, she joined the Women's Social and Political Union (WSPU), after previously belonging to the non-militant women's suffrage societies the National Union of Suffrage Societies and the Central Society for Women's Suffrage. Emily Blathwayt described her as "one of their (WSPU) best London speakers."

In February 1908, Naylor was one of several suffragettes, including Vera Wentworth and the sisters Georgiana Brackenbury and Marie Brackenbury, who were arrested for the Pantechnicon Raid. This WSPU stunt was to drop off a large group of women from a removal van (a pantechnicon) so they could storm the House of Commons.

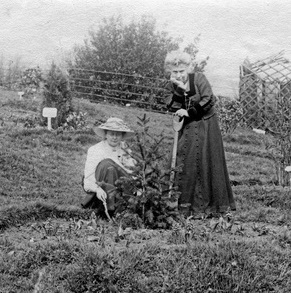
Naylor planting Abies lasiocarpa with Mary Blathwayt in 1910

In 1909 and 1910 she stayed at Eagle House with Linley and Emily Blathwayt. On 9 April 1910 she was given the honour of planting a tree in "Annie's Arboretum".

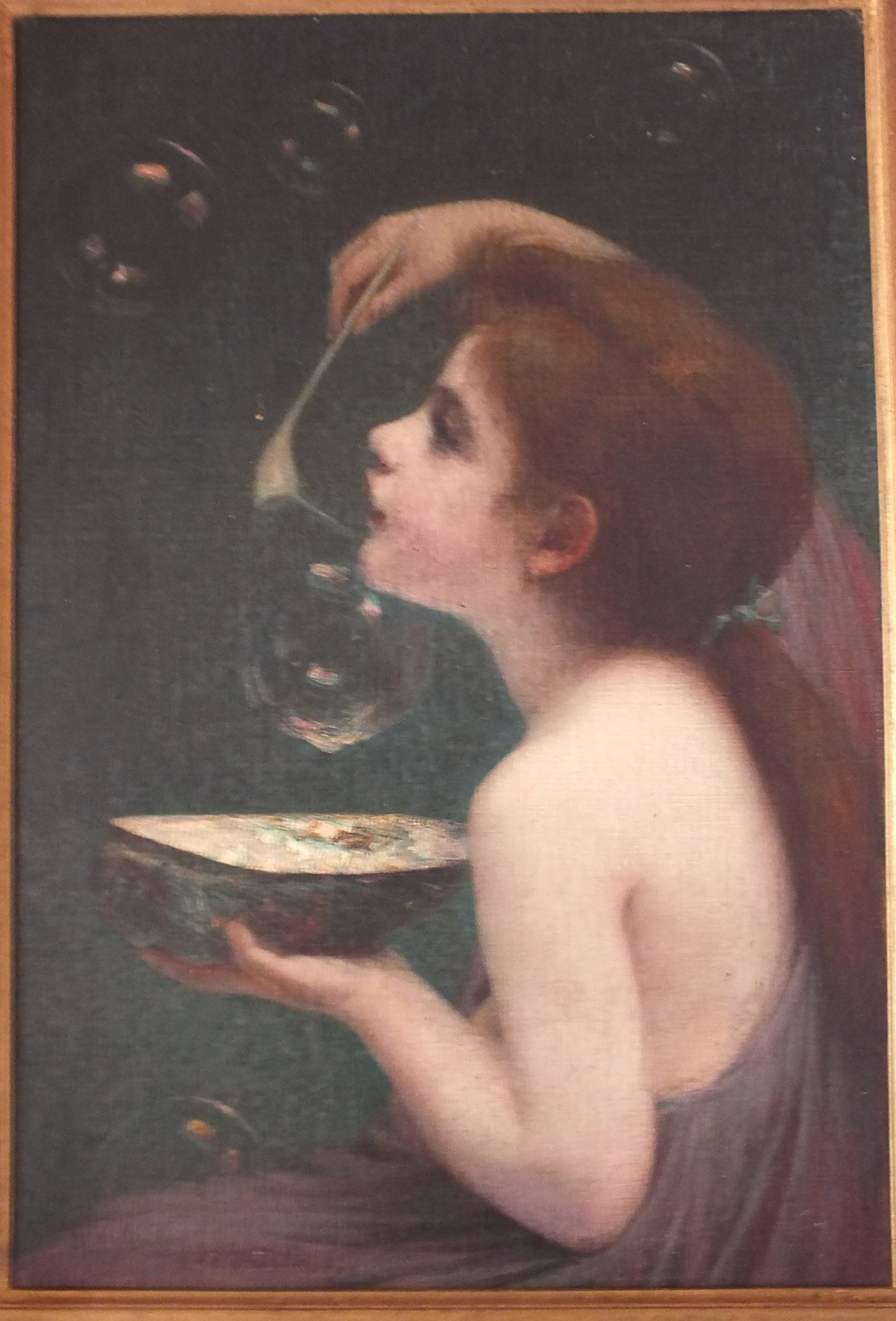
Bubbles, by Naylor. Painted in Paris circa 1890 and exhibited at one of the artist's Paris exhibitions

When Emmeline Pankhurst died on 14 June 1928, Naylor was one of her pallbearers, alongside other former suffragettes Georgiana Brackenbury, Marie Brackenbury, Marion Wallace Dunlop, Harriet Kerr, Mildred Mansel, Kitty Marshall, Rosamund Massy, Ada Wright and Barbara Wylie.

Naylor died in Richmond in 1940 after an air raid.
