= Selina Martin =

Selina Martin (21 November 1882 – 1972) was a member of the suffragette movement in the early 20th century. She was arrested several times. Her Hunger Strike Medal given 'for Valour' by the Women's Social and Political Union (WSPU) was sold at auction in Nottingham in 2019.

== Early life ==
Born on 21 November 1882, in Ulverston, Lancashire, England, Selina Martin was the daughter of Elizabeth Martin and the seventh of her 11 living children. Her father was a picture framer and book seller.

== Women's suffrage ==
In March 1909, Selina Martin was the Lancaster representative among a delegation of suffragettes led by Emily Pankhurst and Georgina Solomon seeking to speak with the Prime Minister at the House of Commons. The women were arrested and imprisoned. On 21 December 1909, Selina Martin and Leslie Hall (Laetitia Withall), again directly approached the Prime Minister H. H. Asquith as he was leaving his motor car, and tackled him on the subject of women's rights. He did not answer the ladies, causing Selina Martin to throw an empty ginger beer bottle into the empty car.

Both women were immediately arrested, and were afterwards remanded in custody for six days. Bail was refused, though Martin promised that both she and Hall would refrain from militant action until their trial. The women were removed to Walton Gaol, and were treated as though they were convicted criminals.

A WSPU poster showing the force feeding of Suffragettes in prison.

As with many suffragettes, they protested by refusing to eat. Martin also barricaded her cell, but the officials forced their way in, pulled her off the bed and flung her on the floor, shaking and striking her unmercifully. Shortly afterwards her cell was visited by the deputy medical officer, who ordered that she should get up and dress. She explained that she had been wet through by the snow storm on the previous day and that her clothes were still saturated, for no attempt had been made to get them dry, but she was forcibly dressed and, with her hands handcuffed behind her, was dragged to a cold, dark punishment cell and flung on the stone floor. She lay there in an exhausted state for some hours, being unable to rise without the aid of her hands and arms, which were still fastened behind her back, until, at last, a wardress came in and lifted her onto the bed board. The irons were kept on all night.

On Friday, the third day of her imprisonment, Martin was brought up before the visiting magistrates. She protested against the way in which she was being treated, pointing out that she was still an unconvicted prisoner, but she was told that the officials were quite justified in all that they might do. The same evening several wardresses entered her cell and ordered her to go to the doctor's room to be forcibly fed. "I refused," she says, "and was dragged to the foot of the stairs with my hands handcuffed behind. Then I was frog-marched, that is to say, carried face downwards by the arms and legs to the Doctor's room. After a violent struggle I was forced into a chair, the handcuffs removed, my arms being held by the wardresses, whilst the doctor forcibly fed me by that obnoxious instrument, the stomach tube. Most unnecessary force was used by the assistant medical officer when applying the gag. The operation finished, I walked handcuffed to the top of the stairs but refused to return to the punishment cell. Then two wardresses caught me by the shoulders and dragged me down the steps, another kicking me from behind. As I reached the bottom step they relaxed their hold and I fell on my head. I was picked up and carried to the cell." Next day she was forcibly fed and afterwards again refused to return to the dark cell, but she says, " I was seized by a number of wardresses and carried down the steps, my head being allowed to bump several times."

On Monday, 27 December, the women were again brought into court, when Leslie Hall was ordered one month's imprisonment with hard labour, and Martin to two months. On returning to prison both the women refused to wear prison dress and recommenced the hunger strike. Each one was then clothed in a straitjacket and placed in a punishment cell. Forcible feeding was continued and they both grew rapidly weaker until 3 February, when they were released.

Meanwhile, the facts as to their treatment whilst imprisoned on remand had been widely circulated, for they had dictated statements for their friends' use whilst their trial was being conducted. The Home Secretary Herbert Gladstone wrote to The Times denying the truth of the statements, declaring that the reason for refusing bail to the women was that they had refused to promise to be of good behaviour until their trial came on, that no unnecessary violence had been used and that the women themselves had made no complaint. But indeed, the inaccuracy of Mr. Gladstone's statements had become proverbial, for he was constantly denying the truth of charges which were clearly substantiated by the most reliable evidence.

Martin's case inspired Lady Constance Lytton to dress as a working class seamstress to prove that poorer prisoners were treated badly. Martin made a significant impact on the women's suffrage movement in Great Britain, and also on the treatment of suffragettes who decided to hunger strike, prompting the Prisoners Temporary Discharge for Ill Health Act 1913 (also known as the "Cat and Mouse Act")

== Illness ==
Selina may have suffered from dyspepsia after her imprisonment. She had an abrasion of the mucous membrane on the front of the inferior turbinated bone of the right nostril, the nostril through which she had last been fed.

Selina had been given a Hunger Strike Medal 'for Valour' by WSPU.

This is now in possession of The National Gallery of Victoria, Australia who bought it at auction in 2019.
