= Mathilde Wolff Van Sandau =

British suffragette

Elise Eugenie Mathilde Wolff Van Sandau
- Born: 1843; Dresden, Germany
- Died: 1926 (aged 83); Putney, London, England
- Burial place: Putney Vale Cemetery, London, England
- Other names: Matilda Wolff
- Organization: Women's Social and Political Union
- Known for: Suffragette activism, vegetarianism and woman's chess.
- Relatives: Grandfather Dr. E Schwabe, private chaplain to the Duchess of Kent
- Honours: Elsie Wolfe Van Sandau - Hunger Strike Medal for Valour

Elise Eugenie Mathilde Wolff Van Sandau (1843–1926) was a British suffragette. She was imprisoned three times, for smashing windows and went on hunger strike. She was awarded the Women's Social and Political Union Hunger Strike Medal 'for Valour'. She was also a musician and a founder of London's women's chess club and an active vegetarian. Research by the British Library suggests that she used different spellings of her name, including Elsie when arrested as a suffragette.

== Life and suffrage activism ==
Elise Eugenie Mathilde Wolff was born in Dresden, Germany, in 1843. She was the granddaughter of Dr. E. Schwabe, private chaplain to the Duchess of Kent. She was a pianist, a music teacher and became a founder member of the London Ladies Chess Club, and became a leader in vegetarian groups. Research by the British Library suggests that she used different spellings of her name, including Elsie when arrested as a suffragette.

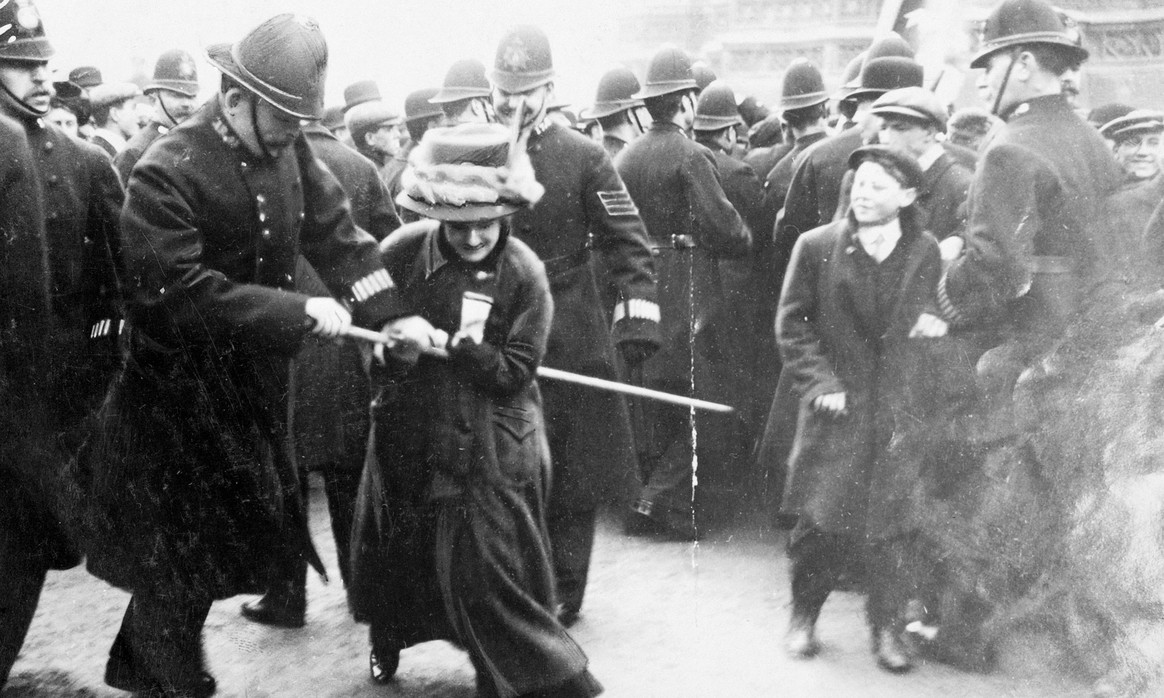
Black Friday: police and a suffragette

Wolff Van Sandau joined the militant Women's Social and Political Union protesting on women's right to vote. She was among the three hundred women brutally attacked by police and men in the crowd for about six hours, on what is known as 'Black Friday' on 18 November 1910, when the women's deputation approached the House of Commons but were prevented from entering. Over 100 women were arrested, including Miss Wolff de Sandau, as noted in the following day's Times newspaper but all women were eventually released, without charge.

Wolff Van Sandau joined two hundred women, organised on 1st and 4 March 1912, to carry out what was a second wave of window smashing protests in Covent Garden, London. This took place at the same time as the Parliament was debating a Conciliation Bill (for some women to get the right to vote, which was not passed). In the same month, she was arrested with Katie Mills for smashing the windows of the Howick Place Post Office, as postal services were seen by suffragettes as a 'symbol of oppressive male government'.

== Hunger strike ==
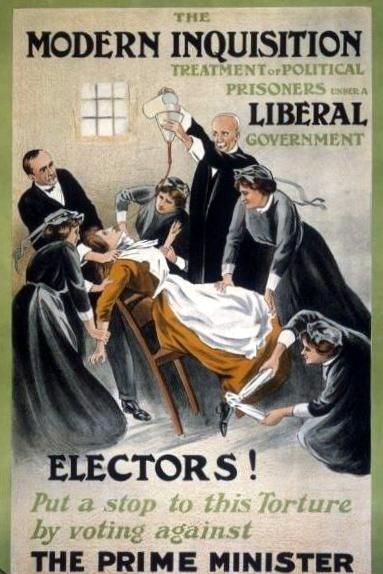
poster showing a suffragette being force-fed

Wolff Van Sandau was sent to prison and immediately went on hunger strike. Suffragettes on hunger strike were frequently force-fed and objected to this 'treatment' as well as being treated as criminals not as 'political' prisoners. A roll-call of those being released, excluding Patricia Woodlock, who got a longer sentence was created (probably for the WSPU welcome event). In recognition of her suffering in prison, the WSPU awarded her a Hunger Strike Medal 'for Valour' designed by Christabel Pankhurst, with the ribbon in the colours of the women's suffrage movement – green, white and purple, representing 'hope, purity and dignity' – and a bar dated 4 March 1912.

The presentation box was inscribed:

ELSIE WOLFF VAN SANDAU – BY THE WOMEN'S SOCIAL & POLITICAL UNION IN RECOGNITION OF A GALLANT ACTION, WHEREBY THROUGH ENDURANCE TO THE LAST EXTREMITY OF HUNGER AND HARDSHIP, A GREAT PRINCIPLE OF POLITICAL JUSTICE WAS VINDICATED.

The National Archive record lists suffragette prisoners who were officially pardoned when the WSPU discontinued militancy at the start of World War One. Elsie and Mathilde Wolff Van Sandau are listed separately with a total of three arrests.

== First women's chess club ==
In 1895, Wolff Van Sandau had set up one of the first women's chess clubs, being elected as the first vice-president of the London Ladies' Chess Club, which initially had to compete against men's clubs. She hosted chess committee meetings at her home 49 Elgin Crescent. She also advertised her music teaching and performances and availability for a more formal school engagement in the chess club magazine.

== Women leading in vegetarian societies ==
In 1897, Wolff Van Sandau, a confirmed vegetarian, was among those who performed to an audience of 700, at the 4th International Vegetarian Congress of the International Vegetarian Union in London. Later in her life, she was chosen to be the honorary secretary of Brighton and Hove Vegetarian Society.

In 1926, Wolff Van Sandau was lodging in Putney. She died in a local nursing home on 29 August 1926, aged 83 and was buried in Putney Vale Cemetery as Matilda Wolff.

== Hunger Strike Medal auctioned ==
Wolff Van Sandau's Hunger Strike medal came to light in a drawer in a home in East Sheen, London a hundred years later, and it was auctioned in Derbyshire in June 2019. It was sold privately for £12,500 and the valuer at Hansons Auctioneers, Helen Smith, said of her actions:

Her decision to go on hunger strike shows she was willing to die for her cause. Would today’s generation of women have been so selfless? We’re very proud to sell this medal, which is worthy of a museum or an important suffragette collection.

The auctioneer Isabel Murtough remarked:

I hope this find reminds people of the sacrifices Miss Wolff Van Sandau and her fellow suffragettes made a century ago to help women gain rights many of us now take for granted.
