= Charlotte Blacklock =

British suffragette

- Born: 1857; Brighton, England, United Kingdom of Great Britain and Ireland
- Died: 1931 (aged 73–74)
- Organisation: Women's Social and Political Union
- Known for: Suffragette activism
- Parent(s): Joseph and Emma Blacklock (pharmacists)
- Relatives: Cousin: Amy Sayers (artist)
- Honours: Hunger Strike Medal for Valour

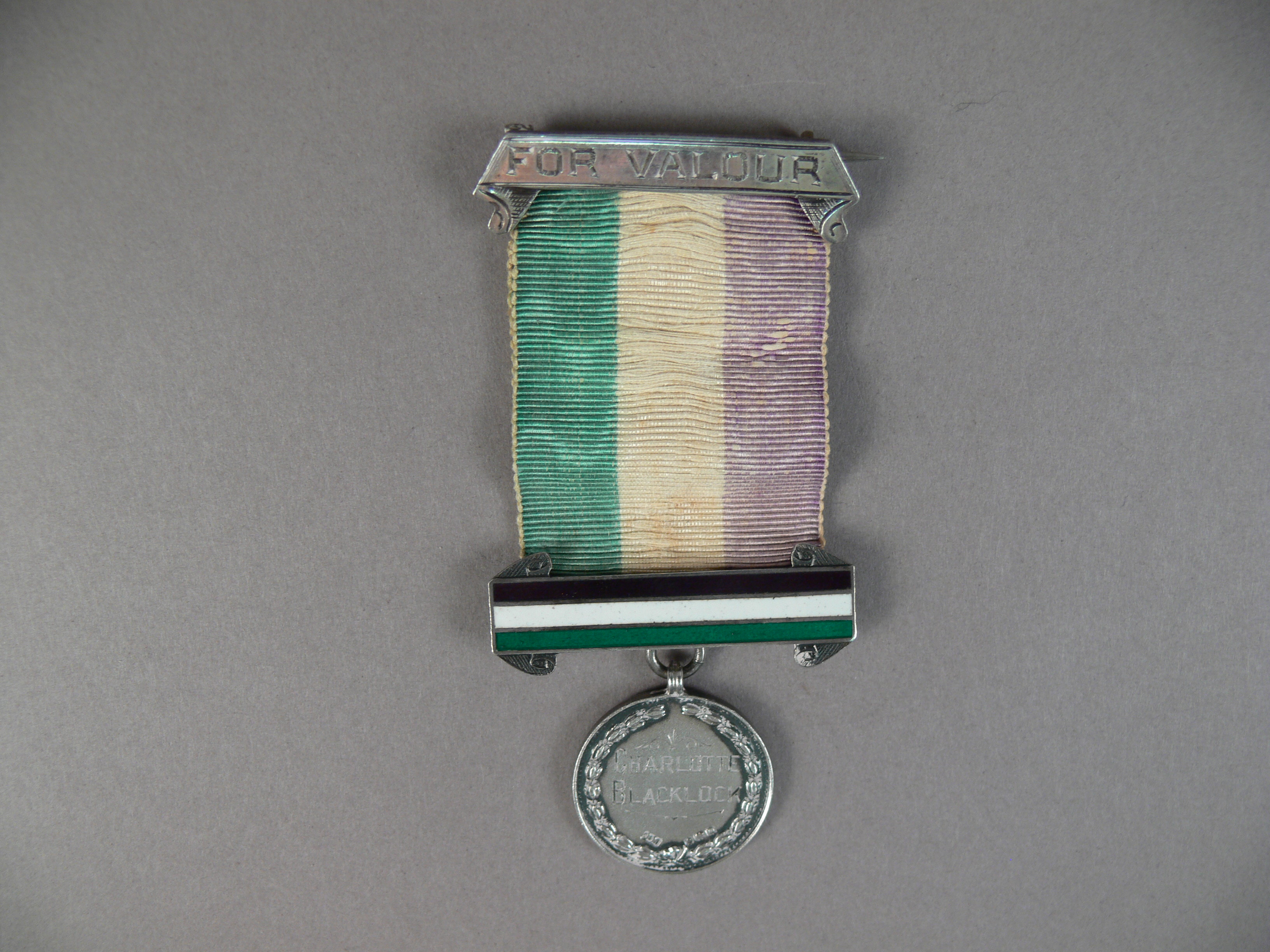
Charlotte Blacklock's Hunger Strike Medal

Charlotte Blacklock (1857–1931) was a British suffragette, given a Hunger Strike Medal for her going on a hunger strike in the cause of women's right to vote.

== Life ==
Blacklock was born in 1857 in Brighton, Sussex as the youngest child of Joseph Davidson (or Davison) Blacklock and Emma Walton Blacklock who ran two pharmacist shops at 32 Old Stiene and 109 Kings Road, Brighton (the contemporary term was a chemist, druggist and soda water manufacturer). She had a half brother, Arthur Woolsey Blacklock, (born 1840, who qualified as a Doctor in Aberdeen, later an astronomer) from her father's first marriage and had two older brothers Philip Walton, born 1853, who helped their mother continue the business when their father died in 1876, and William born 1855, and a sister Anne Maria, born 1854.

She was described as a governess in the 1881 census.

Blacklock was close to her cousin, an artist Amy Sawyers, who later painted her portrait.

She was based in London and then moved to Ditchling, Sussex in 1918.

Blacklock died in 1931.

== Involvement in the suffrage movement ==
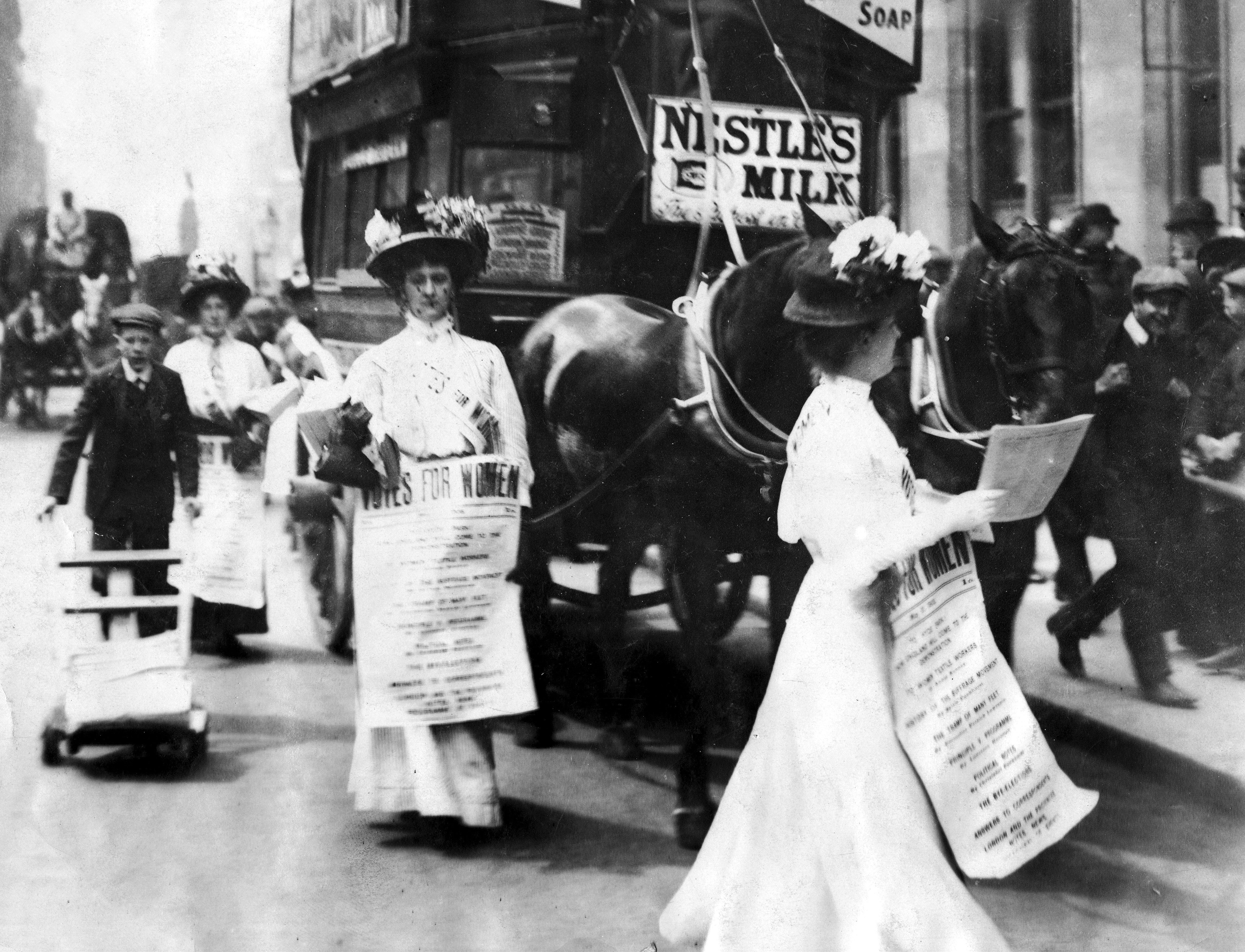
Votes for Women newspaper

Blacklock joined the London Chelsea branch of the Women's Social and Political Union before November 1908, when she wrote in Votes for Women about the parades wearing 'placards of purple, green, and white....acting the part of sandwich men' and speakers Mrs Penn Gaskell, Miss Naylor and (coming soon) Miss Canning being used to attract a 'fashionable audience' in Sloane Square.

In April the following year, Blacklock was writing about the Chelsea Art Stall for WSPU and visit by author Laurence Housman, co-founder of the Men's League for Women's Suffrage.

Blacklock was also among the first of seeking what would now be called 'crowdfunders' to help pay the rent for a local shop for merchandising materials for the WSPU in Chelsea

Blacklock was arrested on 11 March 1912, for breaking windows of Charles Lynton in Picadilly, London which were valued at £6 15shillings, a point disputed by her defence at the trial. Altogether one hundred and twenty-six (or two hundred and twenty women took part but not all were charged, depending on source) and the estimate of damage worth an estimated £4000 or even as much as £6000. The violence and arrests were described in the press as far away as Australia. Australian women had achieved the vote before the British women.

Blacklock was given a severe sentence of four months imprisonment. She went on hunger strike and was force-fed.

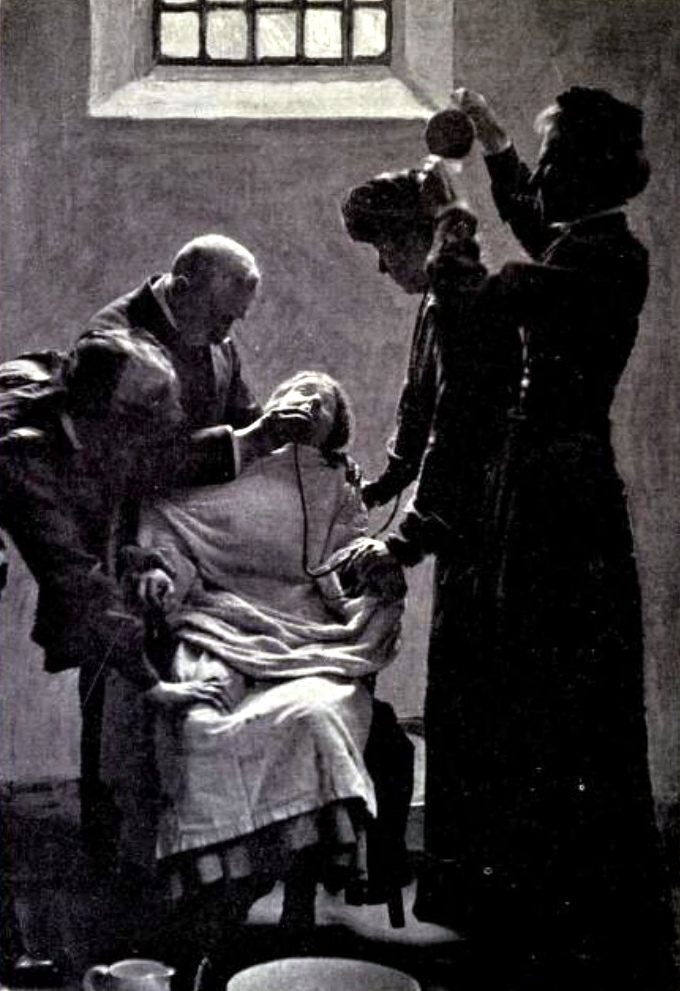
Force feeding suffragettes

She signed an autograph book 1 May 1912, along with other prisoners at Birmingham Prison, auctioned in 2012.

Blacklock was awarded one of the one hundred Hunger Strike Medals 'for Valour' with the date 1 March 1912 on the bar, in recognition of her suffering for the cause by the WSPU.

Since 2011 her medal has been displayed in the Museum of Australian Democracy, with a portrait of her painted by her cousin Amy Sawyers.
