= Laetitia Withall =

Australian-British poet, author, and suffragette

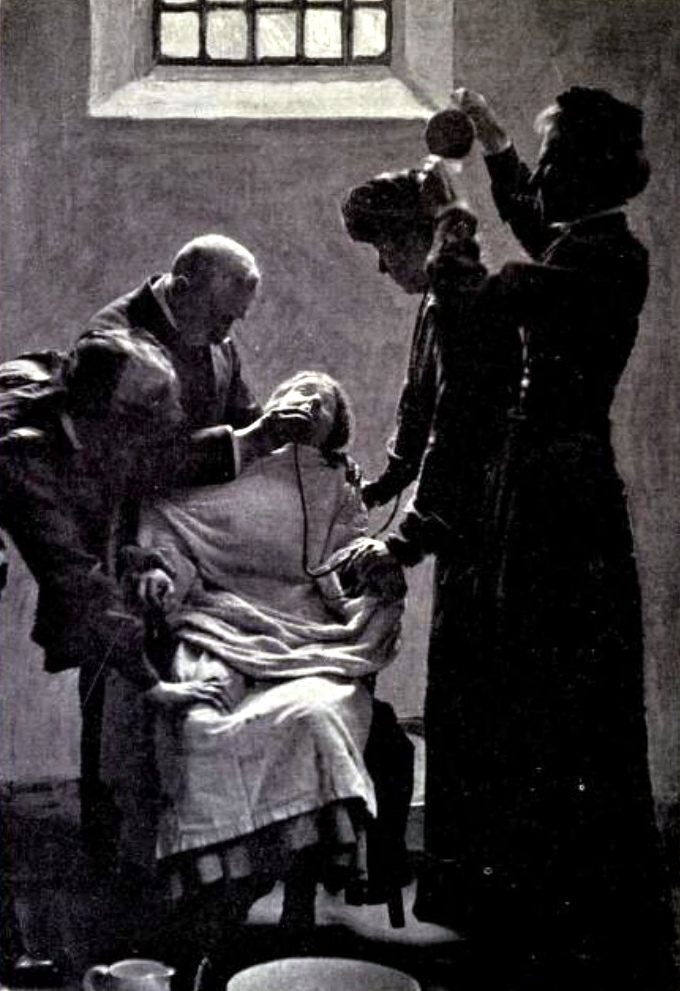
A suffragette being force-fed; Withall endured this treatment in prison in 1909

Laetitia Withall (30 August 1881 – 11 March 1963) was an Australian-born poet, author and militant suffragette who campaigned in the United Kingdom for the Women's Social and Political Union (WSPU) under the name Leslie Hall. On her imprisonment she went on hunger strike and was force-fed for which she received the Hunger Strike Medal from the Women's Social and Political Union (WSPU). This medal is now in the collection of the National Library of Australia.

== Early years ==
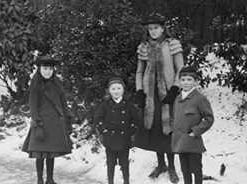
(Left to right) Laetitia Withall with her siblings Osborn, Adelaide and Richard (c1891)

Withall was born in Adelaide in Australia in 1881, the daughter of her British-born parents Louisa Margaret née Reed (1858–1951) and architect Latham Augustus Withall, OBE (1853–1925) and moved with her family to the United Kingdom when she was aged 7; here she was to remain for the rest of her life but never forgot the country of her birth.

== Activism ==
She was first arrested in Birmingham on 18 September 1909 as Leslie Hall (a name she had adopted so as to prevent the embarrassment of her parents). On 21 December 1909 in Liverpool she and Selina Martin approached the Prime Minister H. H. Asquith as he was leaving his motor car, and tackled him on the subject of women's rights. He didn't answer the ladies, causing Martin to throw an empty ginger beer bottle into the empty car. Both women were immediately arrested, and were afterwards remanded in custody for six days. Bail was refused, though Martin promised that both she and Withall would refrain from militant action until their trial. The women were removed to Walton Gaol, and were treated as though they were convicted criminals, being treated with considerable violence in prison.

On Monday, 27 December 1909 the two women were again brought into court, when Withall/Hall was ordered one month's imprisonment with hard labour, and Martin to two months. On returning to prison both the women refused to wear prison dress and recommenced the hunger strike. Each one was then clothed in a straitjacket and placed in a punishment cell. Force-feeding was continued and they both grew rapidly weaker until 3 February 1910, when they were released.

Meanwhile, the facts as to their treatment whilst imprisoned on remand had been widely circulated, for they had dictated statements for their friends' use whilst their trial was being conducted. The Home Secretary Herbert Gladstone wrote to The Times denying the truth of the statements, declaring that the reason for refusing bail to the women was that they had refused to promise to be of good behaviour until their trial came on, that no unnecessary violence had been used and that the women themselves had made no complaint. But indeed, the inaccuracy of Mr. Gladstone's statements had become proverbial, for he was constantly denying the truth of charges which were clearly substantiated by the most reliable evidence.

Her signature is among those embroidered on The Suffragette Banner designed at the Glasgow School of Art by Ann Macbeth (1875–1948) and her students and today held in the collection of the Museum of London.

== Later life ==
A poet and author on spiritual matters, Withall's books include: A Traveller Through Time: Glimpses Of A Soul's Past (1928); The Window And Other Poems (1927); Of Meditation And Prayer (1934); Of Prayer. A Simple Talk (1932), and When Half-Gods Go. A Spiritualistic Composition (1922).

In 1939 Withall was living at 8 Linden Avenue in Broadstairs in Kent and here she died in 1963 aged 82. She never married.

In 1961 aged 80 she donated her Hunger Strike Medal to the collection of the National Library of Australia.
