= Janie Terrero =

British suffragette

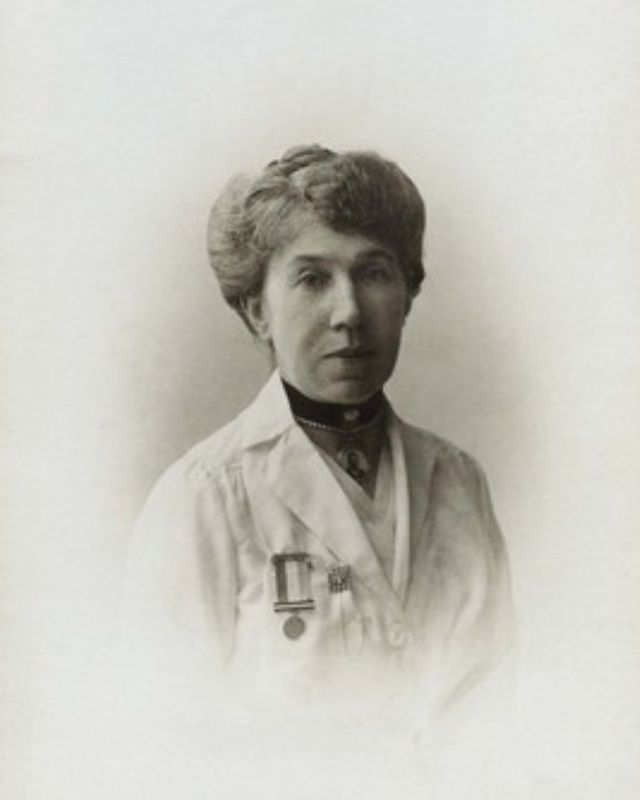
- Janie Terrero wearing her Hunger Strike Medal and Holloway brooch c.1912
- Born: 14 April 1858; Finchingfield, Essex, England
- Died: 22 June 1944 (aged 86)
- Burial place: Southampton Old Cemetery, Southampton, England
- Organisation(s): National Union of Women's Suffrage Societies (NUWSS); Women's Social and Political Union (WSPU)
- Awards: Hunger Strike Medal

Janie Terrero (14 April 1858 – 22 June 1944) was a militant suffragette who, as a member of the Women's Social and Political Union (WSPU), was imprisoned and force-fed for which she received the WSPU's Hunger Strike Medal.

== Early life ==
Born as Jane Beddall in Finchingfield, Essex in 1858, she was the youngest daughter of Eliza, née Fitch, (1815-) and Thomas Beddall (1795–1865), a gentleman farmer. Hers was a comfortable middle-class upbringing with two servants. She married Máximo Manuel Juan Nepomuceno Terrero y Ortiz de Rosas (1856–1926), known as Manuel Terrero, the son of Manuela Rosas and Máximo Terrero, and the grandson of General Juan Manuel de Rosas, in December 1885. The couple lived at Fir Tree Lodge on Bannister Road in Southampton from 1898 to 1910 when they moved to 'Rockstone House' in Pinner, Middlesex, which was built for them.

== Activism ==
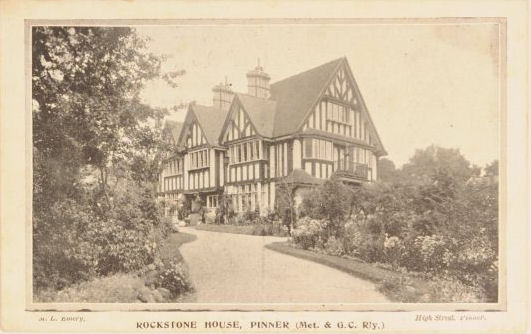
'Rockstone House' in Pinner was built for the Terreros and became the focus of their activities for the WSPU

A Suffragist since the age of 18, Janie Terrero joined the Women's Social and Political Union (WSPU) in 1908. She was also a member of the National Union of Women's Suffrage Societies (NUWSS). She formed a local branch of the Women's Social and Political Union in Pinner in Middlesex in 1910, becoming its Honorary Secretary. At her home 'Rockstone House' she and her husband gave drawing-room parties in support of the WSPU in 1905 and 1907. In 1911 Lady Constance Bulwer-Lytton was the guest speaker at a garden party given by the Terreros in support of the WSPU at their home. Like many other suffragettes, Janie Terrero boycotted the 1911 Census, which only lists her husband at their home address.

In 1910, following Black Friday, Terrero hosted four injured suffragettes in her home whilst they recovered from their injuries at the hands of the police. She supported suffragettes imprisoned in Holloway Prison over Christmas 1911 with a hamper, and received an embroidered handkerchief in thanks from Cissie Wilcox, who had been one of the injured suffragettes who recuperated at her home the previous year. By 1912 the Terreros were living in Harrow.

Terrero was among 200 women arrested in March 1912 who had taken part in a window-smashing campaign in London to coincide with the reading of the Conciliation Bill in Parliament. Terrero had the support of her husband Manuel, who was a member of the Men's League for Women's Suffrage. She had not wanted him to know of her involvement in the campaign beforehand “as I know with your usual kindness and consideration for me you would want to come too, this I could not allow” .... “I feel my honour as a woman at stake and I must take up my stand with the rest. If I should get into prison don't pay my fine but let me go through it properly ...” On 2 March 1912 she appeared at Bow Street Magistrates' Court to answer charges of wilful damage after smashing windows. On being convicted at the London Sessions on 19 March 1912 she received a sentence of four months in Holloway Prison where she went on hunger strike and was twice force-fed. A prison doctor ended her force-feeding, presumably because of the effect it was having on her health, and she was released a few days before the end of her sentence. Whilst she was imprisoned and on hunger strike, her cat Blackie refused to eat at home and died. Her signature is among those embroidered on The Suffragette Handkerchief in Holloway in March 1912.

Whilst she was incarcerated her husband Manuel was "officially informed" that he not allowed to see her, receive or write letters to her nor send in any food for the first two months, treatement that was not applied to other prisoners. He wrote a letter to the Pinner Gazette newspaper on 4 May 1912 highlighting the treatment of the women prisoners and describing how "weak and ailing" she was after hunger strike and forced feeding but full of "quite courage and determination".

She later wrote an account of her experiences in Holloway Prison:

“I was in close confinement for twelve days, was in two hunger strikes & was forcibly fed in April & again in June. To those who intend to be actively militant, I want to say this; you cannot imagine how strong you feel in prison. The Government may take your liberty from you & lock you up, but they cannot imprison your spirit. The only one thing the Government really fears is the hunger strike. They fear it not because of our pain & suffering, but because it damages their majorities. How strong that weapon made us feel. If they had only dared, they would have put us in a lethal chamber. Some people wonder at the courage of our women, but I believe physical courage is a common human attribute, & I do not see why women should possess it in a lesser degree than men... I should like to make it quite clear that the forcible-feeding was not carried out with any idea of saving life but as a deliberate act of brutality to terrorise and torture.”

Terrero refused to sign a petition calling for the 'ousting' of Emmeline Pethick-Lawrence and Frederick Pethick-Lawrence from the WSPU in 1912, and appears to have taken little part in the campaign for women's suffrage thereafter.

== Legacy ==
Jane Beddall Terrero de Rosas died in her home in 1944 aged 86. She and her husband Manuel are buried in the Anglican section of Southampton Old Cemetery in Southampton in Hampshire.

She left extensive notes detailing her treatment in Holloway and these are held in the Suffragette Fellowship Collection in the Museum of London. Under the terms of her husband's will, she bequeathed 2,000 books to the library of the Working Men's College. These were dispersed when the library was disbanded in the 1990s. The Museum of London holds an embroidery in its collection decorated in the suffragette colours of purple, white, and green, which was sewn in Holloway Prison by Janie Terrero. It is embroidered with the names of her fellow hunger strikers who were imprisoned with her at Holloway Prison for their involvement in smashing windows as part of a suffragette campaign in March 1912.
