= Muriel Robertson =

Scottish protozoologist, bacteriologist (1883–1973)

Muriel Robertson FRS, FRSTM
- Born: 8 April 1883; Glasgow, Scotland
- Died: 14 June 1973 (aged 90); Derry, Northern Ireland
- Education: University of Glasgow
- Known for: protozoology and bacteriology lifecycle of Trypanosoma gambiense in blood and in its insect carrier, the tsetse fly
- Scientific career
- Workplaces: Lister Institute
- Thesis: A study of the life histories of certain trypanosomes

Muriel Robertson FRS, FRSTM, F.I.Biol (8 April 1883 – 14 June 1973) was a Scottish protozoologist and bacteriologist at the Lister Institute, London from 1915 to 1961. She made key discoveries of the life cycle of trypanosomes. She was one of the founding members of the Society for Microbiology along with Alexander Fleming and Marjory Stephenson.

== Early life and education ==
Robertson was born in Glasgow, the seventh of 12 children of Elizabeth Ritter and her husband, engineer Robert Andrew Robertson. Up to the time of her entry to the University of Glasgow she was taught at home. After her father's sudden death, when she was 16, her initial thoughts were to study medicine; but her mother insisted on her taking a degree in Arts first. Preliminary scientific courses could be included in such a degree, and it was there she acquired her first formal scientific teaching. It was in studying with Graham Kerr that she was given her first chance to work on the life cycles of protozoa. This would prove a major theme and interest for the rest of her life. She worked for two years in Glasgow after graduating. An early project was a study of Pseudospora volvocis, a protozoan parasite of the alga Volvox.

== Career ==
In 1907 she was awarded a Carnegie Fellowship, which she held from 1907 to 1910. With this, she was able moved to Ceylon (now Sri Lanka) to study trypanosome infections in reptiles, being provided with space to work by Arthur Willey, curator of the museum at Colombo She then joined the staff at the Lister Institute in London under Professor Edward Alfred Minchin from 1910 to 1911.

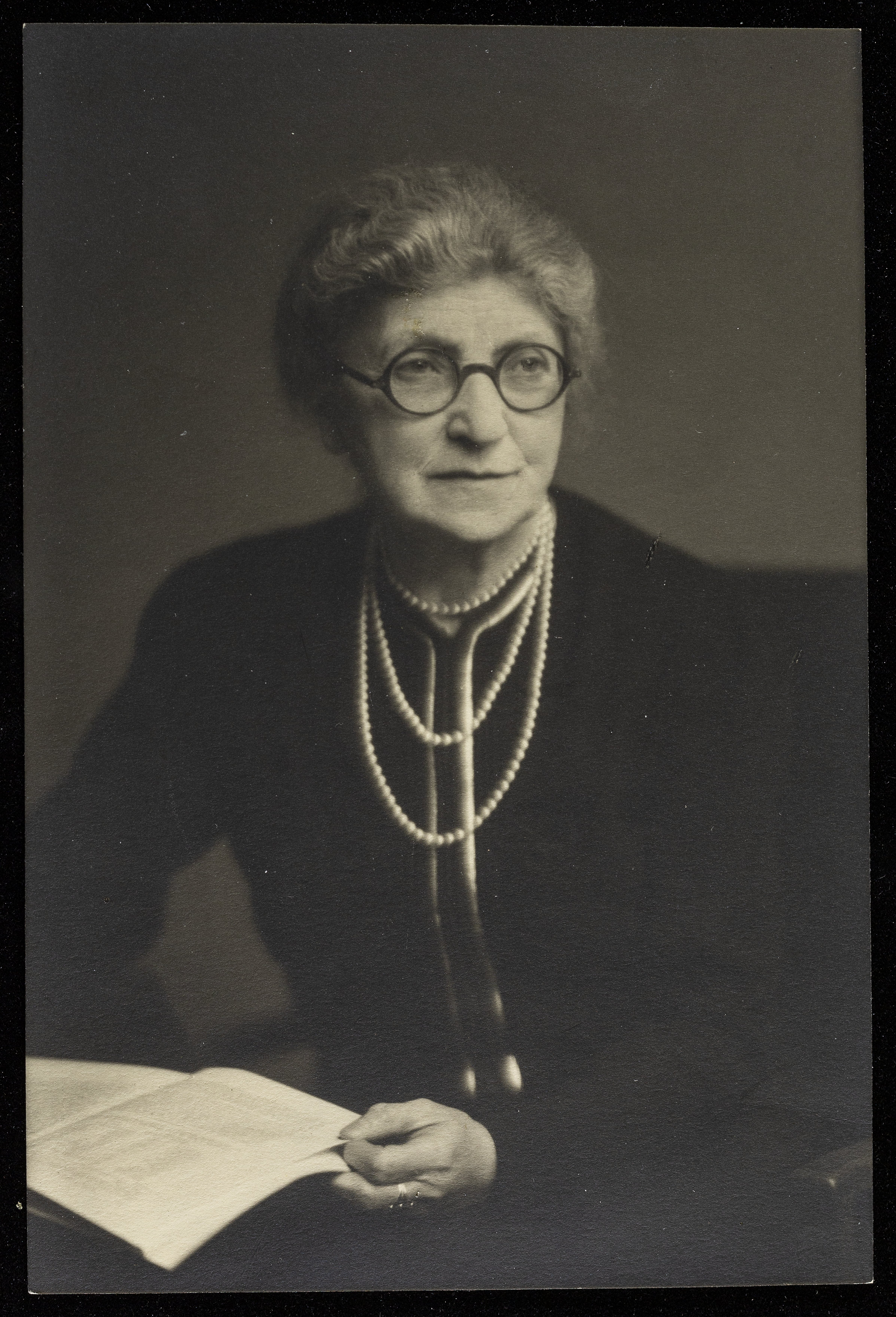
Muriel Robertson

It was at this time that a serious outbreak of sleeping sickness occurred in Uganda, believed to be responsible for more than 200,000 deaths. Three successive commissions were sent to study the disease, under the auspices of the Royal Society. Robertson was appointed protozoologist to what was then the Uganda Protectorate, from 1911 to 1914. She worked in the Royal Society laboratory at Mpumu, close to Lake Victoria Nyanza: the epicentre of the disease. At the laboratory she researched the lifecycle of Trypanosoma gambiense (which causes African trypanosomiasis or sleeping sickness) in blood and in its insect carrier, the tsetse fly, publishing her ground-breaking results, in particular establishing the path by which the trypanosome moves to the salivary glands of the fly. In 1923 she obtained her Doctor of Science from the University of Glasgow for a thesis entitled A study of the life histories of certain trypanosomes, which involved cytological studies of extreme delicacy. A review of this research in her obituary, in the journal Nature, states: ''Her work on this subject has never been superseded nor indeed equalled, and the accuracy of some of her conclusions ... is only now being fully appreciated.".

On the creation of the Tropical Medical Research Committee by the Medical Research Council in 1936, Robertson was amongst the first of those elected to the Committee.

Robertson returned to the Lister Institute in 1914 shortly before World War I. Except for a period at the Institute of Animal Pathology in Cambridge during the Second World War, she worked at the Lister Institute until 1961. Most of her work was as a protozoologist, but she worked on bacteriology during both world wars. Her work helped clarify and classify the anaerobic bacteria (Clostridia) primarily responsible for gas-gangrene.

She was elected a Fellow of the Royal Society in 1947, in the same year as Dorothy Hodgkin, and only two years after the first women, Marjory Stephenson and Kathleen Lonsdale, were elected. The following year, she became an Honorary Doctor of Law (LLD) at the University of Glasgow. She was also a fellow of the Royal Society of Tropical Medicine and of the Institute of Biology, and a member of the Pathological Society, the Society for Experimental Biology and the Medical Research Club. She was a founder of the Society of General Microbiology and served on its council from 1945 to 1948.

After officially retiring in 1948, Robertson continued to work, sponsored by the Agricultural Research Council, teaching her skills to research workers at the Lister Institute until 1961. She suffered from acute glaucoma in the 1950s and one eye was removed. She continued work in Cambridge for a short period before finally retiring to the family estate in Limavady in Northern Ireland. After a period of illness, she died at Altnagelvin Area Hospital in Derry on 14 June 1973.

== Commemoration ==
Robertson is described as a "Trailblazer" by the tour company Gallus Pedals, which organises bicycle tours in Glasgow. The company state on their website that ten women inspired the individual names of the bikes, and include a biography of each in several different categories. The category "Pioneers in Science and Medicine" includes Robertson, Marion Gilchrist and Dorothea Chalmers Smith.

== See also ==
- Protistology
