= Frances Olive Outerbridge =

British suffragette and nurse

Frances Olive Outerbridge (1846–1934) was a nurse and British suffragette, in 1912, she was rewarded the Women's Social and Political Union Hunger Strike Medal 'for Valour'.

== Family ==
Her parents were Stephen Outerbridge and Ann Williams. Her mother was from Swansea and her father was born in Bermuda, where the family had been based form the early 17th century. Amongst Stephen's eight siblings was Dr Thaddaeus Aubrey Outerbridge, who in an article discussing the family's links to slavery is described as: -

“born into this prominent family, which was known for its trading, shipbuilding, and privateering. The family built considerable wealth and held notable positions within the Bermuda government, and was very influential in the island’s early development.”

18 people in Bermuda with the surname Outerbridge claimed over £1100 for 83 slaves from the British Slave Compensation Commission following the abolition of slavery in 1833; This includes a Stephen Outerbridge (who might be Frances's father) for 14 slaves.

Anna Maria Outerbridge (who was a niece of Thaddaeus and a counsin of Frances) also campaigned for the women suffrage cause in Bermuda which resulted in two bills, which failed, being debated in 1895 and 1896 in the Bermuda Colonial Parliament of which Thaddaeus Outerbridge was a member and supported the bills.

== Life ==
Frances's early family life was based in Swansea and she is shown in the 1861 census, aged 14, living at Oxford Street Swansea and at school. By 1881 she is shown in the Census living with her brother, Thomas, in St Pancras, London, she is shown as having no occupation.

At the time of the 1891 census Frances lived in the same home as Caroline Downing, another Suffragette activist, both are described as trained nurses. In 1898 Caroline and Frances were jointly presented with a silver plated tray "in appreciation of their self-sacrificing labours among the sick and poor of the parish [of St Marks Victoria Park] for ten years. This was probably at the time they moved to Lewisham, where they are recorded in the 1901 census, Caroline is shown as the head of the household with Frances recorded as her relationship being "companion". Also part of the household is an adopted daughter, Olive Vaughan, aged 3.

In common with many women's suffrage campaigners Caroline and Frances refused to take part in the 1911 census, although Caroline's initials and name is written on the form alongside "Suffragette – information refused". At time of the 1921 census Caroline and Frances are living at the same address along with the adopted daughter Olive and her husband William and Dorothy, their one-year-old child.

== Suffragette Activity ==
Frances Outerbridge is one of 456 people listed as having been arrested in records found in the WSPU offices during a Police raid. It records Frances as having been arrested as part of the extensive window smashing on 1 March 1912 and she was subsequently sentenced to four months in prison.

However, there are no Police or Court records of an Outerbridge being charged for Suffragette offences. Frances Williams (which was her mother's maiden name) was arrested on 1 March 1912 and sentenced to four months in prison. And it is with this name that Frances is reported in WSPU newspaper Votes for Women. On 1 March an estimated 150 women took part in window smashing in London's West End. She was charged for breaking a window the value of £8 at Pound and Co, trunk makers in Regent Street and was sentenced by the Magistrates to four months in prison, she was reported as saying: -

“it was a political protest against injustice, made in her old age, and not with any malice”.

Even in prison Frances Williams make clear her intention to protest for "full rights of political prisoners" and wrote to the Home Secretary. These records also show that she was one of 26 prisoners who went on hunger strike but were considered in too ill to be force fed. Her release was authorised by the Home Office on 22 June 1912.

Another part of the same record notes the medical reasons for her being released: -

“Over 65 years of age and presented indication of arterial degeneration. Would not be fed without considerable resistance involving some danger. Refused food. Likely to suffer from continued abstinence.”

Corroboration for Williams being Outerbridge is also provided by her reception at a branch meeting of the Sydenham and Forest Hill branch of the WSPU, on her release, alongside Catherine Downing. The specific reasons for Frances using an alias is unclear but as discussed earlier the Outerbridge's were a strongly influential family in Bermuda.

== Death ==
Frances continued to reside with Caroline at 286 Devonshire Road Forest Hill until she died on 18 August 1934 at the age of 88. Probate was granted to Caroline on 11 October 1934.

== Sale of Hunger Strike Medal ==
Frances's Hunger Strike Medal was sold at Auction in Stroud, Gloucestershire in January 2022 for £13,400. Also sold during this sale was the silver plated tray presented to Frances and Caroline.
