= Barbara Wylie =

British suffragette (1861–1954)

Barbara Fanny Wylie
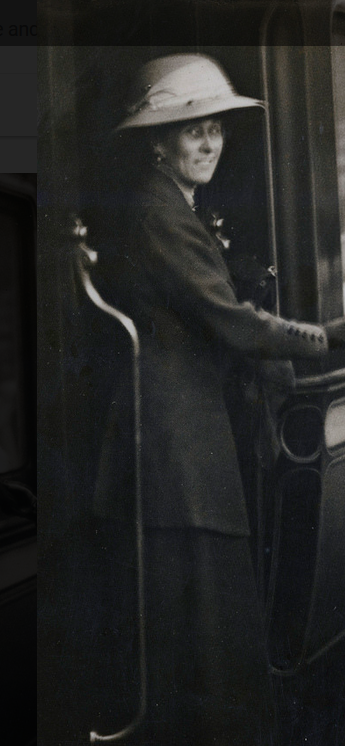
- Barbara Wylie
- Born: 11 September 1861; Shrewbury, Shropshire, England
- Died: 1954 (aged 91–92)
- Occupation: Political activist
- Organisation: Women's Social and Political Union
- Relatives: David James Wylie (brother)

Barbara Fanny Wylie (11 September 1861 – 1954) was a British suffragette. In 1909 she joined the Women's Social and Political Union (WSPU) and in 1910 she joined the Glasgow branch of WSPU as an activist and organizer. Wylie is best known for delivering a speech in support of women's suffrage during her 1912 Canadian speaking tour where she spoke the phrase "deeds not words".

== Family ==
Barbara Fanny Wylie was born on 11th September 1861 in Shrewsbury, Shropshire, England, daughter of Scottish civil engineer, David Wylie and Elizabeth Clarke.

Wylie had three sisters and six brothers. All four Wylie sisters were a part of the British women's movement.

== Women's Social and Political Union – WSPU ==
The Women's Social and Political Union was founded by Emmeline Pankhurst in 1903. The WSPU's agenda to achieve equal franchise for women and was known for its use of militant tactics. The women of the WSPU were not afraid to use violence, go against the law, break windows, rebel against the political leaders as well as spend time in jail. In 1909, Wylie joined the Glasgow branch, which had formed March 1906. By 1910 she was assigned as organizer, however, in 1913 she resigned when Sylvia Pankhurst took over as honorary secretary.

Wylie engaged in the militant action, gave speeches and rallied marches. On 25 July 1910, she was a speaker at Calton Hill, Edinburgh, delivering a synchronized speech that was also being delivered in London about the passing of the women's suffrage bill in its second reading, along with a plea to Parliament to allow the bill to pass into law.

In 1911, Wylie was arrested and imprisoned for seven days. On 11 September 1911, she addressed a suffrage meeting held at the Art Galleries in Kilmarnock, Ayrshire, and explained that women wanted enfranchisement as "only by its means could they express themselves as women and protect their interests as human beings”.

In March 1912, she took part in a window smashing raid in London and was arrested. On 10 August 1912, Wylie was a part of an open-air meeting that addressed the injustice women were facing due to their lack of ability to vote, supported by the fact that women were already, in fact, a part of politics as well as working and supporting themselves, but without a voice.

Also during 1912, the WSPU hosted an open-air meeting in Doncaster, South Yorkshire, and a crowd of anti-suffragists attacked the event, heckling Wylie who was speaking, snatching away leaflets and throwing rotten eggs and orange peel until the meeting was broken up. Violet Key Jones was one of the organisers of the event and later said: "this sort of rowdyism can only help the cause... I would have spoken if I could make my voice heard above the noise". When Wylie spoke in Bradford on Avon, Wiltshire, with Aethel Tollemache, the women had to be escorted to the railway station by the Police in order to protect them from a crowd of young men who had howled at and rushed at them.

== Canada tour (1912-1913) ==
Wylie went to Canada in 1912 on a speaking tour. The women's rights movement of Canada had asked for a representative of their sister branch the WPSU to speak across the country to bolster and unite the suffragists’ branches within Canada, to strengthen the position of the women in Canada, to offer them support and, according to Wylie, if all else fails to instil militant action in order to make change happen. Pankhurst felt that Wylie had an advantage in Canada as her brother David was in the Province of Saskatchewan Conservative government. David Wylie, however, was not a supporter of the women's movement until 1917. Another Conservative member Albert Bradshaw took Wylie's initiative to the legislature.

Wylie was initially not welcomed to Canada due to her militant reputation and was warned that if she started any riots that she would be deported immediately, as the suffragists in Canada did not display the same type of militant force as the WSPU. However, this would not stop Wylie, and she indicated that she would come to Canada by airplane if she had to.

Before her departure, Wylie met with Prime Minister Robert Borden of Canada in London. She laid a foundation for why the WSPU was coming to Canada, in the hope that he would show full support women's rights. She had a single major goal during her tour, to move Canadian women from passivity to demands to be heard.

The tour started in Quebec. On 4 November 1912, she was in Montreal, Quebec, giving a speech with Emmeline Pankhurst, Sylvia Pankhurst and Forbes Robertson Hale. She urged the women who attended to stand up for rights and freedoms and voice a stance for change.

On 3 April 1913, in Calgary, Alberta, Wylie gave a speech that became the speech she was known for and also became a slogan for the WPSU. She said: “Abandon ladylike constitutional methods. Don’t be docile, don’t be ladylike. Don’t dread being conspicuous. Now is the time for deeds, not words". She used descriptive language and implications that the women had not been standing up for themselves and that it was imperative that these women needed to start taking action and by any means possible, yet the women of Calgary did not take to these implications too lightly.

She also spoke in Vancouver and New Westminster in British Columbia and addressed meetings in Regina, Moose Jaw and Maple Creek in Saskatchewan.

== Return to England ==
Back in England, Wylie published articles about her tour including one called "Woman's position in Canada."

On 22 June 1914 Wylie was arrested again outside His Majesty's Theatre.

== Friendship with Emmeline Pankhurst ==
Wylie was a close friend and ally of Emmeline Pankhurst within the suffrage movement. There were many times that Wylie supported Pankhurst, including on 22 May 1914 when she was acting as a bodyguard to protect Pankhurst from being arrested at St. Andrew's Hall, Glasgow. This ended with Wylie being injured and arrested. Wylie's home was also considered a safe haven, nicknamed “the mouse hole” that Pankhurst used when she was hiding from the police.

In 1919, Wylie was among a group of former suffragettes who raised a "testimonial fund" to support Christabel and Emmeline Pankhurst through a time of financial difficulty. When Emmeline Pankhurst died on 14 June 1928, Wylie was one of her pallbearers, alongside other former suffragettes Georgiana Brackenbury, Marie Brackenbury, Marion Wallace Dunlop, Harriet Kerr, Kitty Marshall, Marie Naylor and Ada Wright.

== Later life ==
Wylie died in 1954.

== See also ==
- List of suffragists and suffragettes
