= Cadiz sisters =

Two Irish sisters notable for their involvement in the Irish suffrage movement

Rosalind Mary and Leila Gertrude Garcias de Cadiz
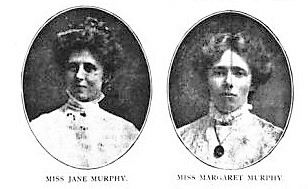
- Rosalind and Leila de Cadiz also known as Jane and Margaret Murphy
- Origin: Roscommon, Ireland
- Members: Rosalind, Leila

Rosalind Mary Garcias de Cadiz (15 June 1878 – 22 January 1955) and Leila Gertrude Garcias de Cadiz (born c. 1879), known as the Cadiz sisters, were two sisters notable for their militant involvement in the Suffragette movement in Ireland. They went by the names Jane Murphy and Margaret (Maggie) Murphy during their militancy.

== Biographies ==
Born in Madras, India to Margarita Lawder, a Roscommon woman travelling to India and Thomas Raymond de Cadiz, a Spanish lawyer born in Trinidad, the sisters were two of six children in total. There were twins born in Dublin and the remainder during their parents' time in India. The couple died within a few years of each other leaving the children to be raised first by their maternal aunt and cousins in St John’s House, Lecarrow, County Roscommon.

The sisters became interested in the suffrage movement. In 1910, they joined the Irish Women's Franchise League as well as the Women's Social and Political Union in Britain. In 1912 the sisters were jailed in Holloway in England where they had undergone hunger strikes and force feeding. Later that year they were part of a group of eight women who smashed windows of government buildings in Dublin. All the women were given jail time in Mountjoy Prison, the length depending on the damage done. The Cadiz sisters were giventwo months each for it. Once again they both refused food while in prison. More militant than the Irish suffrage movement wanted, the sisters were eventually expelled from the Irish organisation in 1913. The sisters sued the Irish organisation but the case was thrown out.

In 1914 they wrote to The Irish Times calling for the franchise to be given to women before they would respond to the need for nurses in the First World War. Despite that position both women did volunteer and spent the war, and the Easter Rising, as nurses for the Red Cross on the Voluntary Aid Detachment. Rosie was injured with severe spine damage during the war which caused her mobility issues; she was discharged as a result. Both women also lost their fiancés to the war and did not marry. They lived the rest of their lives in Dublin. Rosie died before her sister on 22 January 1955 aged 77 years old.

Both sisters received VAD certificates for their work as nurses but Leila also received a Hunger Strike Medal for the hunger strike she undertook in 1912. The medal has an engraving.

Presented to Leila Garcias de Cadiz by the Women's Social and Political Union in recognition of a gallant action, whereby through endurance to the last extremity of hunger and hardship, a great principle of political justice was vindicated.

== Sources ==
- "Irish Genealogy-Mother's death" (PDF). Irish Genealogy.
- "Irish Genealogy -Father's death" (PDF). Irish Genealogy.
- "Irish Genealogy -Rosie's death" (PDF). Irish Genealogy.
- "Joyce Smith (b. 1935)". Irish Life & Lore. 2 February 2017.
- "Hidden gems and Forgotten People" (PDF). COUNTY ROSCOMMON ARCHAEOLOGICAL AND HISTORICAL SOCIETY.
- "The Roscommon Suffragette Awarded by the Pankhursts for Hunger-Striking". Indie Tours. 20 July 1912.
- "Discovering Leila: Hunger-Striking Suffragettes Pictured". Indie Tours. 22 June 1912. Archived from the original on 28 March 2019.
- "Centenary of Women's Suffrage: Statements – Dáil Éireann (32nd Dáil) – Tuesday, 6 Feb 2018 – Houses of the Oireachtas". Houses of the Oireachtas website. 6 February 2018.
- Murphy, W. (2014). Political Imprisonment and the Irish, 1912-1921. OUP Oxford. ISBN 978-0-19-956907-6.
- "In the News – Militancy". Dublin Tenement Experience. 8 August 2013.
- "Tracing an Irish suffragette". The Irish Times. 12 October 2009.
- Atkinson, D. (2018). Rise Up Women!: The Remarkable Lives of the Suffragettes. Bloomsbury Publishing. ISBN 978-1-4088-4406-9.
- Ryan, L.; Ward, M. (2018). Irish Women and the Vote: Becoming Citizens, New Edition. Irish Academic Press. ISBN 978-1-78855-015-4.
- Ward, Maeve (19 February 2018). "Rise Up, Women!". Eason Edition.
- "Mountjoy prison". Woman and her Sphere. 27 August 2012.
- "Hanna Sheehy Skeffington Plaque". Dublin City Council. 13 June 1912. Archived from the original on 6 December 2018.
- independent (11 February 2018). "Hanna Sheehy-Skeffington: the woman who led the suffrage fight". Independent.ie.
- "Photo from Holloway prison". Picgnu. Archived from the original on 6 December 2018.
