= Eugenie Bouvier =

Russian political activist

Eugenie "Jeanie" Georgievna Bouvier (1865–1933) was a Russian political activist who participated in the suffragette movement in London, England. She was settled in England by 1891. She was active as a suffragette from 1908, but returned to Russia in 1921. She spent some time working for the Comintern before her death in 1933.

Jeanie was a member of the Women's Social and Political Union (WSPU) branch in Lewisham.

She later aligned herself with the East London Federation of Suffragettes (ELFS) following Sylvia Pankhurst's expulsion from the WSPU and participated in their anti-conscription activity in 1915-16. She served on the Committee of the ELFS and also subsequently on that of the Communist Party (British Section of the Third International) which the ELFS turned into. She gave Russian letters and frequently spoke at meetings about the Russian Revolution. Her family lost their wealth through the revolution, but Bouvier was in favour of this, saying “They ought to have taken it from me years ago, and from all of us who lived on the backs of the people.”

She returned to Russia in early 1921 travelling with delegates to the Third Congress of the Third International held in Moscow, in June–July 1921. She was employed as a translator for this event and subsequently continued to work in that capacity for the Comintern.
