= Marion Wallace Dunlop =

British artist and suffragette (1864–1942)

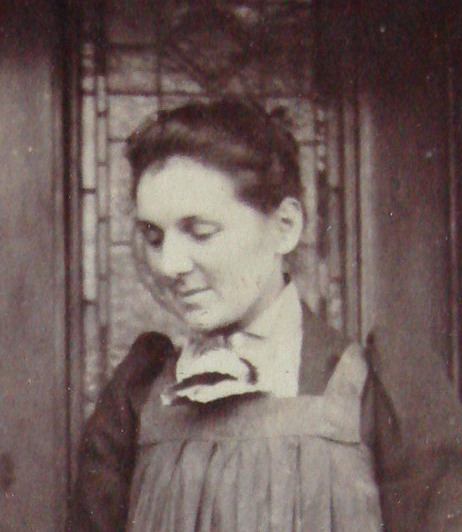
- Born: 22 December 1864; Leys Castle, Inverness, Scotland
- Died: 12 September 1942 (aged 77); Guildford, Surrey, England
- Occupations: Artist and writer
- Known for: Devising hunger strike as a means of suffragette protest

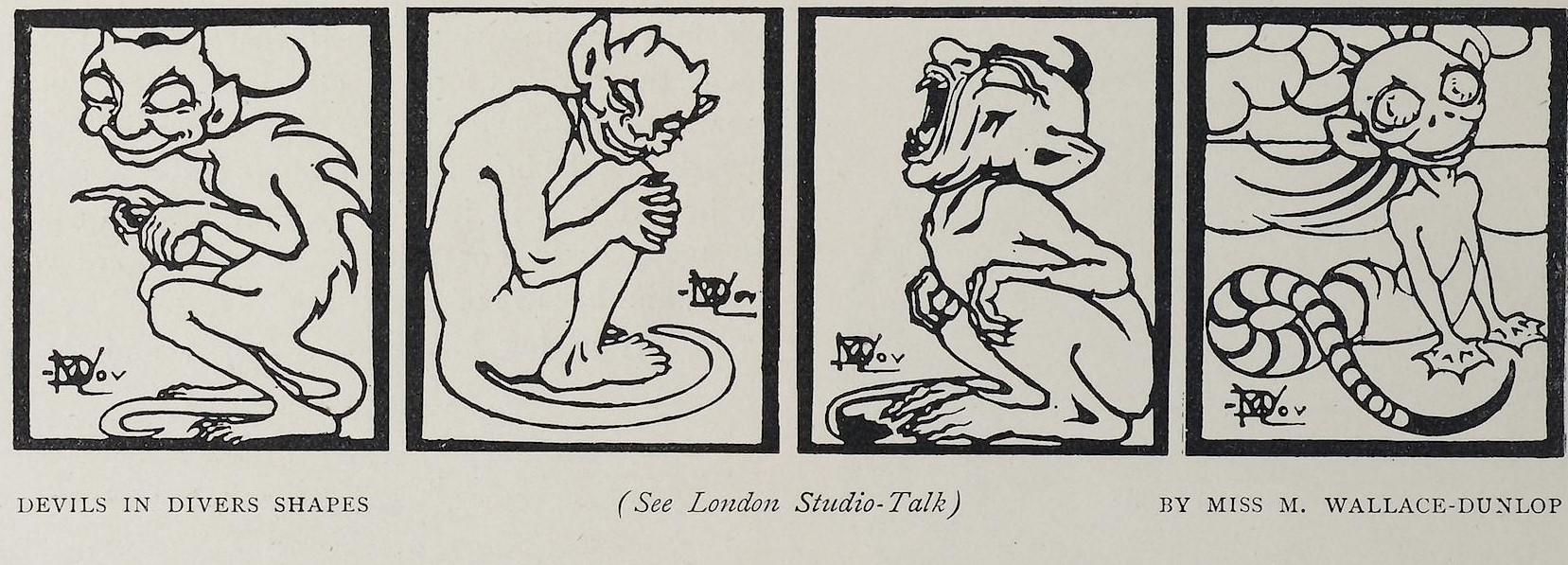
Woodcut illustration by Wallace Dunlop

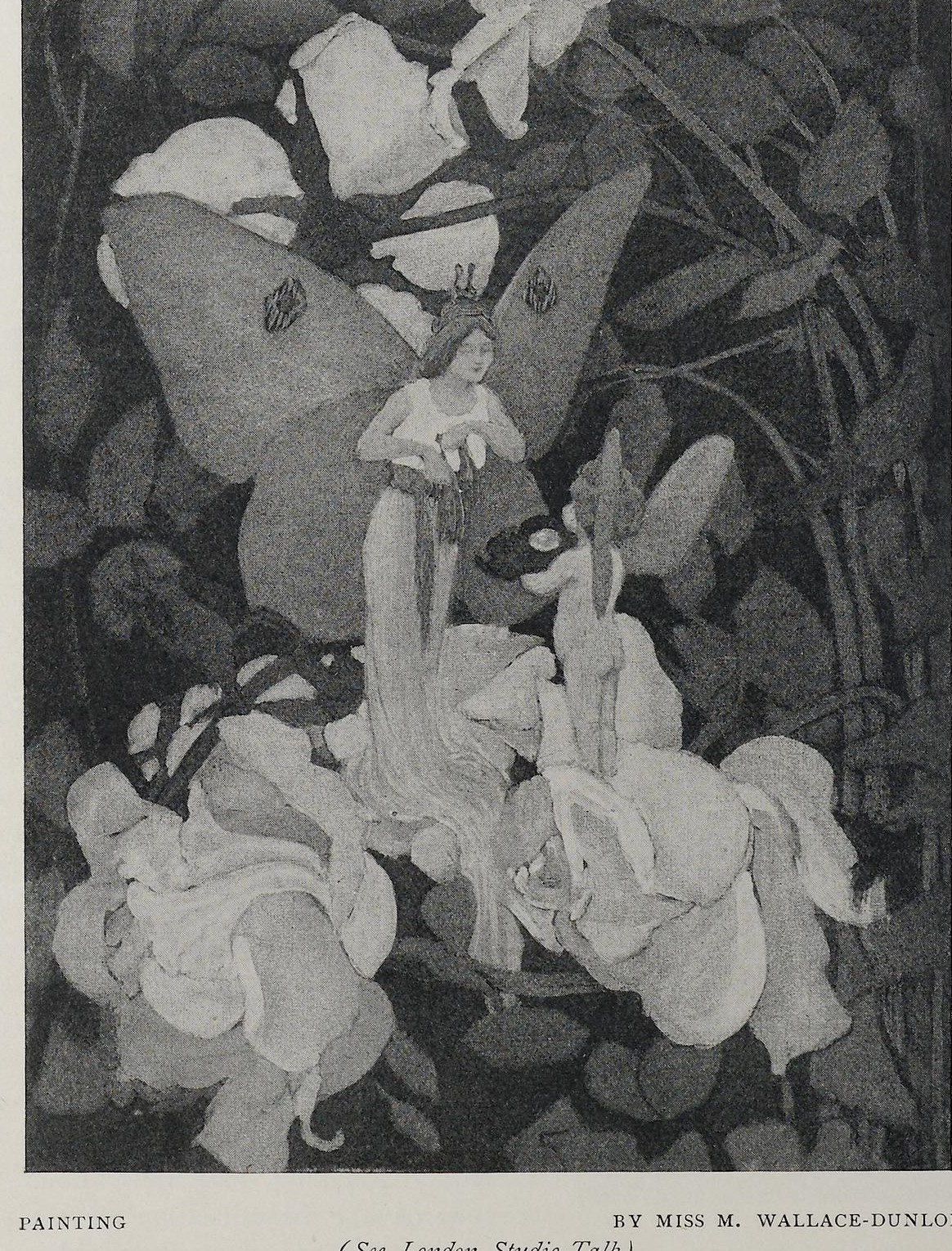
Illustration published in Studio: international art — 36.1906

Marion Wallace Dunlop (22 December 1864 – 12 September 1942) was a Scottish artist, author and illustrator of children's books, and suffragette. She was the first and one of the most well known British suffrage activists to go on hunger strike on 5 July 1909, after being arrested in July 1909 for militancy. She was at the centre of the Women's Social and Political Union and designed some of the most influential processions of the UK suffrage campaign, as well as designing banners for them.

== Biography ==
Wallace Dunlop was born at Leys Castle, Inverness, Scotland, on 22 December 1864, the daughter of Robert Henry Wallace Dunlop and his second wife, Lucy Wallace Dunlop (née Dowson; 1836–1914). Although commonly believed to have studied at the Slade School of Fine Art in London, there is no official record of Wallace Dunlop having attended school there. Her paintings were displayed at the Royal Academy in 1903, 1905 and 1906. In 1899, she illustrated Fairies, Elves, and Flower Babies and The Magic Fruit Garden in art-nouveau style.

Wallace Dunlop was a vegetarian and joined the Theosophical Society in 1911. She resigned in 1913.

=== Women's suffrage ===
Wallace Dunlop became an active member of the Women's Social and Political Union (WSPU) and was first arrested in 1908 for obstruction at the House of Commons along with others like Ada Flatman and again in 1908 for leading a group of women in a march. In June 1909 she was arrested a third time, in this case for stenciling a passage from the Bill of Rights on a wall of the House of Commons which read, "It is the right of the subject to petition the King, and all commitments and prosecutions for such petitioning are illegal." It was upon being arrested for this offence on 2 July 1909 that she commenced her first hunger strike.

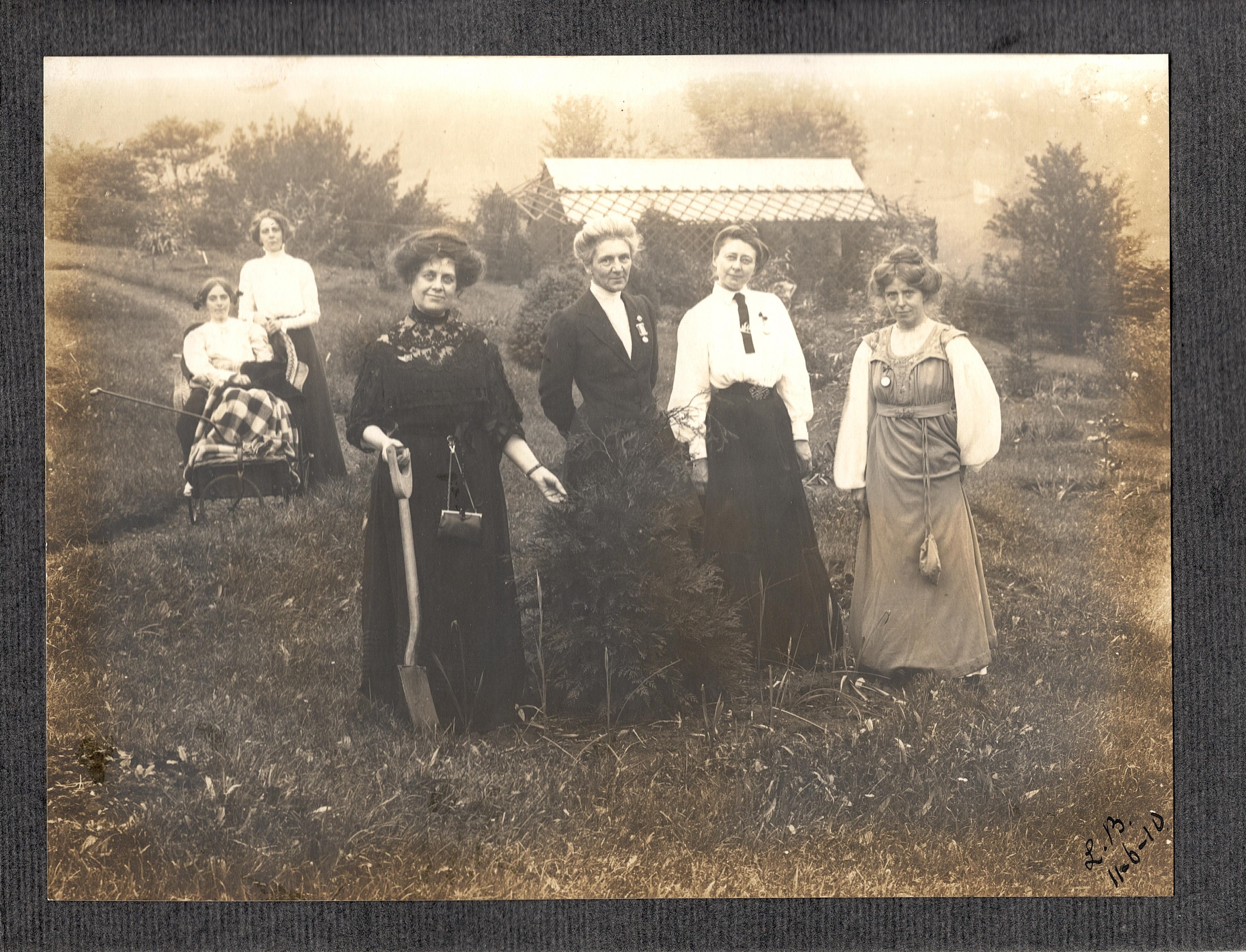

Wallace Dunlop's mode of protest influenced suffragettes after her and other leaders like M. K. Gandhi and James Connolly, who also used fasting to protest British rule.

There was never any suggestion that anyone advised or recommended that Wallace Dunlop go on a hunger strike, and all indications are that it was her idea. She said she would not take any food unless she was treated as a political prisoner instead of as a common criminal. After her actions became common knowledge, hunger-striking became standard suffragette practice. Christabel Pankhurst later reported: "Miss Wallace Dunlop, taking counsel with no one and acting entirely on her own initiative, sent to the Home Secretary, Mr. Gladstone, as soon as she entered Holloway Prison, an application to be placed in the first division as befitted one charged with a political offence. She announced that she would eat no food until this right was conceded." Mrs. Pethick-Lawrence noted that Wallace Dunlop had found a "new way of insisting upon the proper status of political prisoners, and had the resourcefulness and energy in the face of difficulties that marked the true suffragette".

Wallace Dunlop endured 91 hours of fasting before she was released on 8 July 1909 on the grounds of ill health. Hunger striking was her idea and after her success it became official WSPU policy. As a result, in September 1909, the British Government introduced force feeding in prisons. Along with other suffragettes who were imprisoned and went on hunger strikes, Wallace Dunlop was given a Hunger Strike Medal by WSPU.

== Death ==
Wallace Dunlop was a pallbearer when Emmeline Pankhurst died in 1928. She then took on the task of caring for Mary, who was Pankhurst's adopted daughter. Wallace Dunlop died on 12 September 1942 at Mount Alvernia Nursing Home in Guildford.

== Gallery ==
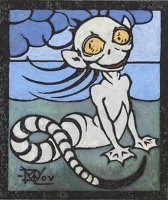
A "Google eyed Demon" woodcut c. 1906

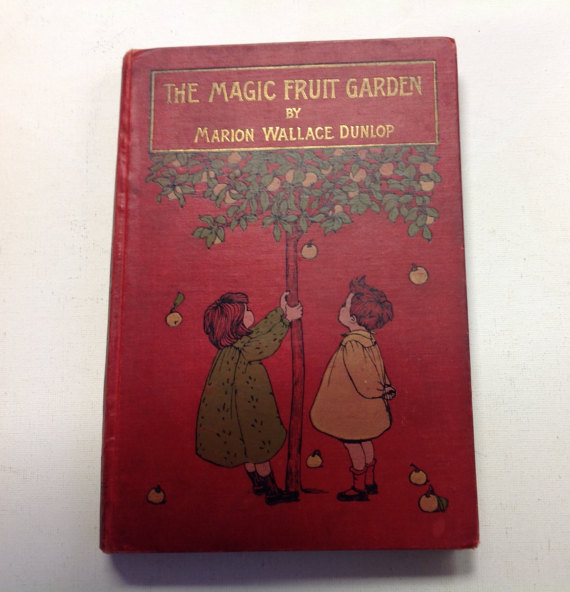
The Magic Fruit Garden by Marion Wallace Dunlop

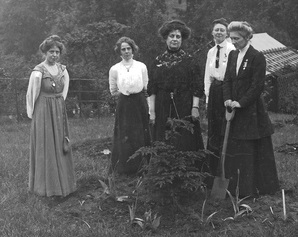
Annie Kenney, Kitty Kenney, Florence Haig, Mary Blathwayt and Marion Wallace-Dunlop at "Suffragette's Rest"

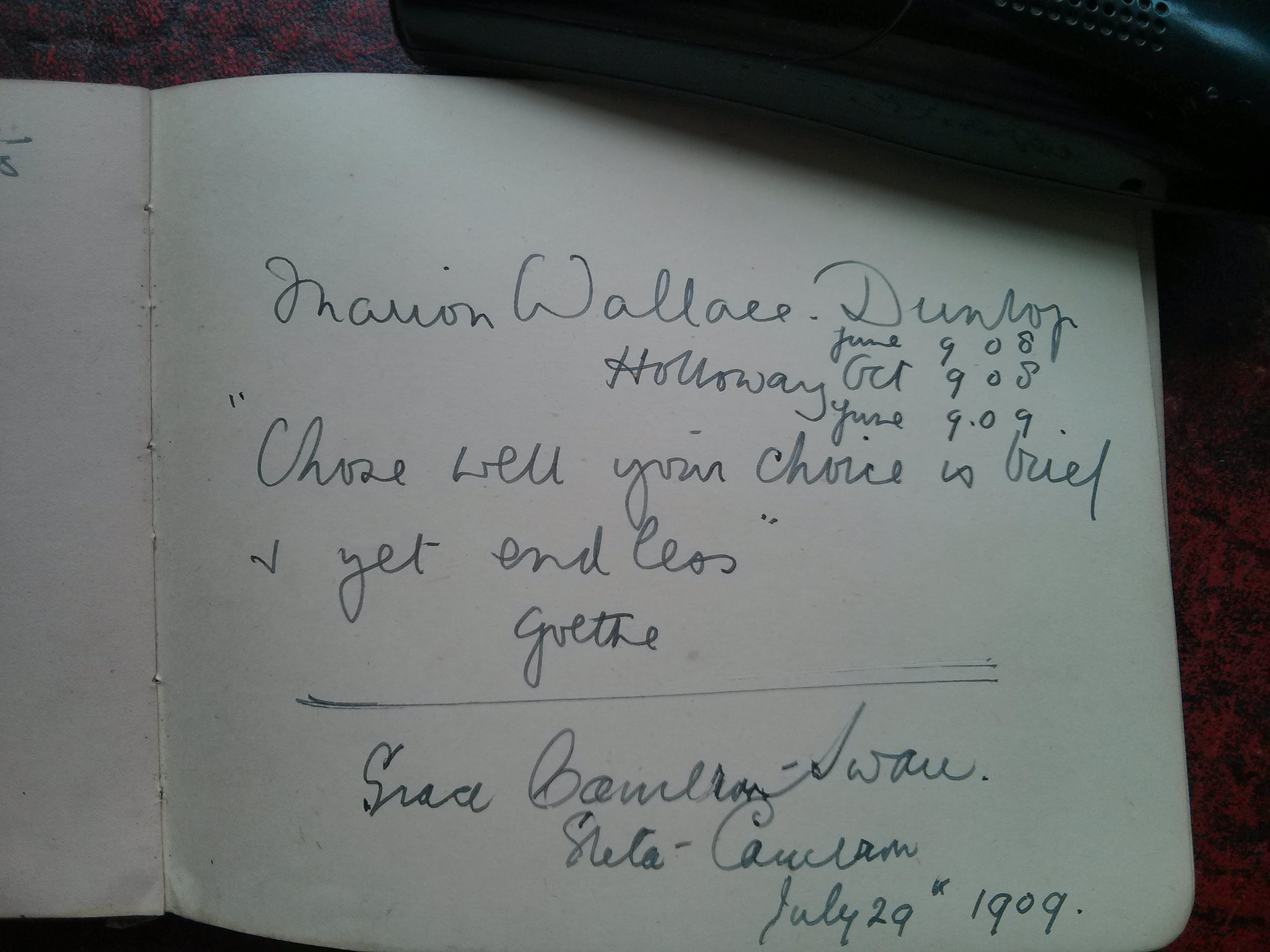
Entry by Marion Wallace Dunlop in Mabel Cappers WSPU prisoners scrapbook June 1909

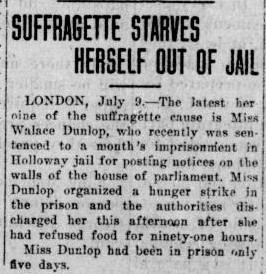
Article about Dunlop's hunger strike in the 10 July 1909, edition of the Daily Arizona silver belt

== See also ==
- Women's suffrage in the United Kingdom
