= Sarah Benett =

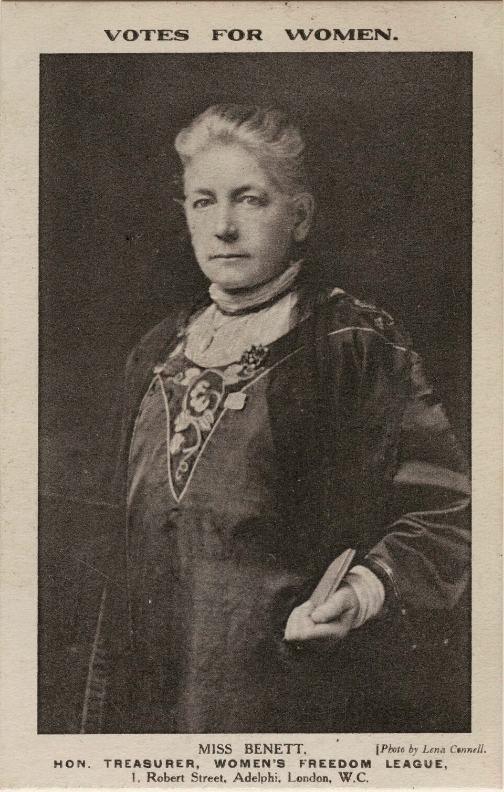
Sarah Benett as Treasurer of the Women's Freedom League in 1909 by Lena Connell

Sarah Barbara Benett (1850 – 8 February 1924) was a suffragette, a member of the Women's Social and Political Union (WSPU) and Treasurer of the Women's Freedom League (WFL). She was one of the "Brown Women" who walked from Edinburgh to London in 1912 and went on hunger strike during her imprisonment in Holloway Prison for which she received the WSPU's Hunger Strike Medal and Holloway brooch.

== Early life ==
Sarah Benett was born in St Pancras in London in 1850, one of nine children born to William Morgan Benett (1813–1891), a solicitor, and Barbara Sarah Waring (1819–1894). Before Sarah Benett became involved in fighting for women's suffrage she was active in social reform. She founded a co-operative society in the village she grew up in, in the New Forest in Hampshire. After the death of her mother in 1894 Benett moved to Burslem in Staffordshire where she started another co-operative society and a general store in nearby Hanley, which she managed. She campaigned in the Staffordshire Potteries to improve the health and working conditions of workers by trying to ban the use of lead in pottery glaze.

== Activism ==
In 1907 after attending a meeting where the speaker was Flora Drummond Bennet immediately realised that this important cause was where she needed to put her efforts and at the age of 57 joined the Women's Social and Political Union (WSPU) and the newly formed Women's Freedom League (WFL). Later that year, she was arrested for joining a WSPU deputation to the House of Commons. She refused to pay a 20s fine for which she received 14 days' imprisonment. In July 1907 Christabel Pankhurst stayed with her while campaigning in the Potteries. Bennet was present at the founding of the Women's Tax Resistance League becoming a tax resister herself and in 1908 was a WFL delegate to the Amsterdam conference of the International Woman Suffrage Alliance.

Benett joined the New Constitutional Society for Women's Suffrage (NCSWS) and was Treasurer of the Women's Freedom League from 1909 until her resignation in 1910 from which time she devoted her efforts to the more militant Women's Social and Political Union. She was one of 120 women arrested for demonstrating outside the House of Commons on 'Black Friday' in 1910 when many women were seriously assaulted by the police.

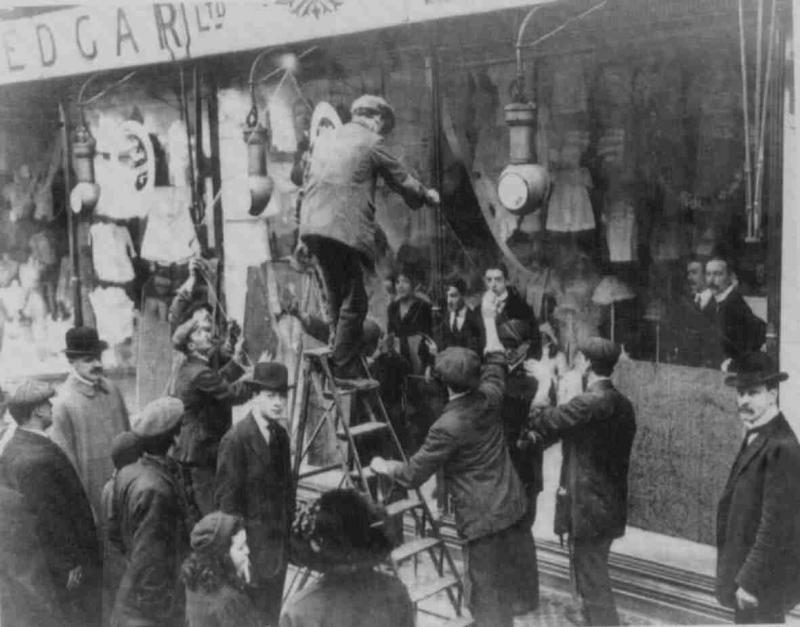
suffragette window smashing campaign

Benett took part in the WSPU's window smashing campaigns of 1911 and 1912 and was released early from her three-month jail sentence in Holloway Prison in 1912 after going on hunger strike, for which action she received the Hunger Strike Medal and Holloway brooch from the WSPU. The application by the elderly Benett (she was 62 in 1912) for skipping ropes and balls for the suffragette prisoners to keep fit in Holloway Prison caused some amusement in the Home Office. A fellow inmate at this time was Kate Williams Evans on whose release Benett wrote a note to her maid Jane which reads: 'Miss Evans will be my guest till she is a little stronger. She has been starving so treat her as an invalid...' Benett's pencilled signature is included in an autograph book collected by Evans in Holloway which also contains the signatures of suffragettes Emily Davison and Emmeline Pankhurst. Benett became a friend of Emily Davison for whom she arranged to smuggle a watch into HM Prison Holloway. In 1916 she organised the annual pilgrimage to Davison's grave in the churchyard of St. Mary's church at Morpeth.

== The march ==
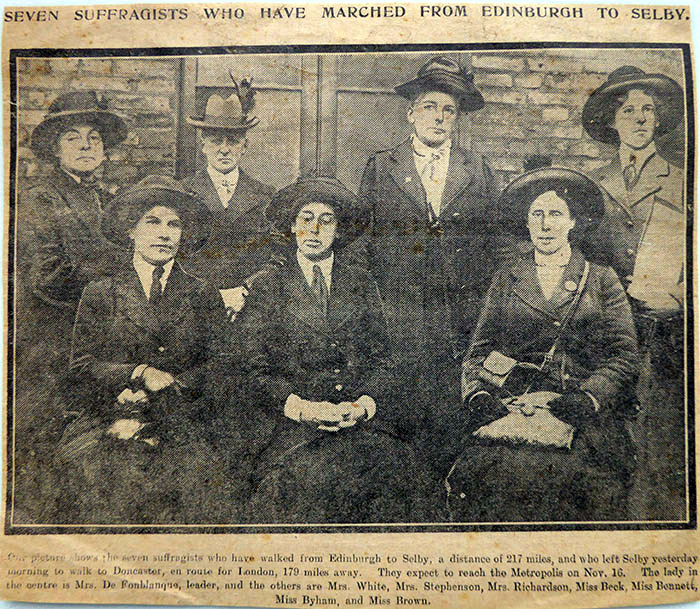
The seven who reached Selby, including Sarah Benett (standing second from right)

When Florence Gertrude de Fonblanque decided to mount a march from Edinburgh to London to draw attention to the women's suffrage cause she initially thought that walking to Edinburgh would be a good idea but it was decided to march from Edinburgh so that the march could end its publicity in London. Only six women including Fonblanque, Agnes Brown and Benett set off on 21 October 1912. As they and Fonblanque traveled from Scotland to London they gathered signatures on a petition and coverage in the newspapers. Fonblanque ensured that they were dressed in brown with rosettes and bright green cockades and they were known as the "Brown Women". They followed the route of the A1 and were joined by dignitaries along the way. On one day near Berwick they walked over 30 miles before the now seven marchers were welcomed by the local Member of Parliament. Their numbers swelled slowly – when they passed through Grantham in November there were twelve walkers. Finally they got to London on 16 November 1912 when they went by tube to Trafalgar Square where the walkers entered to music. Benett later recalled that she "had walked her shoes off trying to get signatures to petition".

== Later years ==
For her part in the smashing of windows at Selfridges department store in 1913 in protest over the government's withdrawal of the Franchise Bill Benett received a six-month prison sentence. Until her death in 1924 she was involved in the Women's Tax Resistance League.

In her later years Benett lived in Finchley in North London. She died in February 1924 having never married. Dr Elizabeth Wilks was an executor to her will.

Her biography Rebel With a Cause: The Life and Times of Sarah Benett, 1850-1924, Social Reformer and Suffragette by Iain Gordon was published in 2018.
