= Minnie Turner =

British suffragette

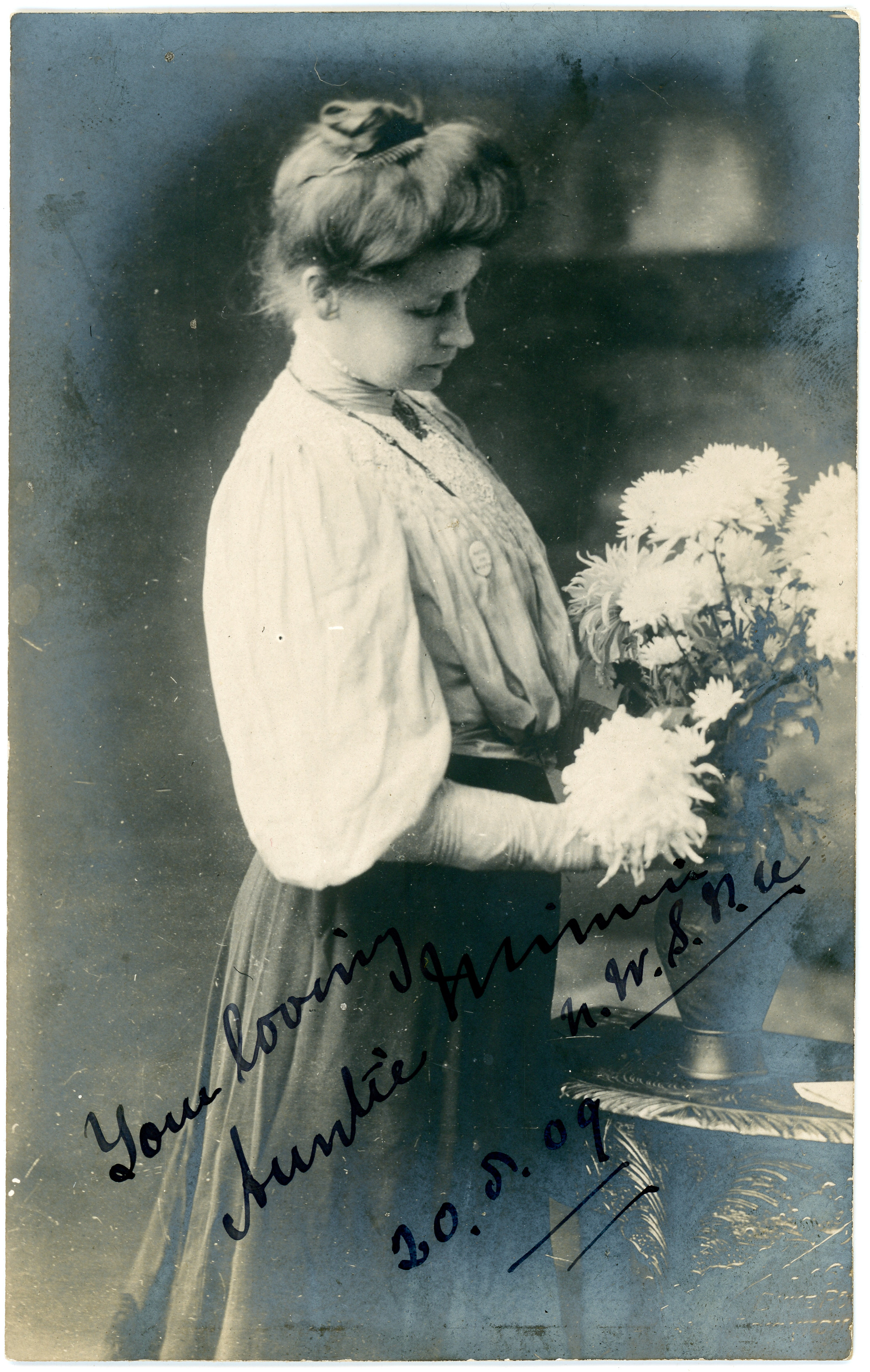
- Minnie Turner, 1909
- Born: 6 May 1866; London, United Kingdom of Great Britain and Ireland
- Died: 1948 (aged 81–82)
- Occupation: Suffragist

Minnie Turner (6 May 1866 – 1948) was a British suffragette who was known for running a guest house, the "Sea View", in Brighton. In November 1911 she was arrested for breaking a window in the Home Office for which she received a 21 day sentence Holloway Prison.

== Life ==
Turner was born Minnie Sarah Turner on 6 May 1866 in London. She ran a guest house in Brighton, the "Sea View", which served as a vacation spot, but also a haven for British suffragettes who had been imprisoned for the suffrage cause, many who were recovering from force-feeding. Her boarders included Lady Constance Bulwer-Lytton, Mary Jane Clarke, Emily Davison, Flora Drummond, Annie Kenney, Mary Naylor, Christabel Pankhurst, Emmeline Pankhurst, Emmeline Pethick-Lawrence, Vera Wentworth, and Ada Wright.

Turner had hosted Minnie Baldock, and paid the travel costs for her to support the local efforts of Mary Clarke in campaigning during the summer.

Turner was arrested twice for her involvement in suffragette protests. In 1910 she was arrested for demonstrating outside the House of Commons of the United Kingdom on Black Friday.

In November 1911 she was arrested for breaking a window in the Home Office for which she received a 21 day sentence Holloway Prison.

Turner was given a Hunger Strike Medal 'for Valour' by WSPU.

Turner's own windows were threatened in retaliation in an anonymous postcard, from 'WHAT HO ALF', and one or two were indeed broken. Turner put a note in the windows affected saying ''Masculine logic. Imitation is the sincerest form of flattery."

In 1912, Emily Davison recuperated from her prison experience with Turner until she was able to travel to Northumberland to see her mother.

Turner was a member of the National Union of Women's Suffrage Societies (NUWSS) the Women's Social and Political Union (WSPU) and the Women's Tax Resistance League(WTRL). She also served as honorary secretary of the Women's Liberal Association in Brighton.

Turner died in 1948.

== Legacy ==
In 2018 a blue plaque honoring Turner was unveiled at the site of the "Sea View" at 13 Victoria Road, Brighton. Her "Holloway brooch" was included in the Brighton Museum's 100 years since the Representation of the People Act, 1918-2018 exhibition. Turner 's collection of suffragette postcards in the Museum of London gives an insight into her supportive role to women activists during their difficult situations.

== See also ==
- List of suffragists and suffragettes
