= WTRL =

WTRL may refer to:

- WTRL-LP, a defunct low-power radio station (94.9 FM) formerly licensed to serve Vonore, Tennessee, United States
- Women's Tax Resistance League
