= Amy Bull =

Amy Bull MBE
- Born: Amy Maud Hicks; 16 July 1877; Great Holland, Essex, England
- Died: 11 February 1953 (aged 75); Little Baddow, Essex, England
- Education: North London Collegiate School Girton Hall
- Occupation: Teacher
- Known for: Suffragette

Amy Maud Bull, MBE or Amy Hicks (16 July 1877 – 11 February 1953) was a British teacher and suffragist.

== Life ==
Bull was born in Great Holland Hall in Essex in 1877. She went to Girton Hall where she won a prize every year until she obtained a first degree in classics in 1899. She was a lecturer at Westfield College in 1900–1901, then taught at Belvedere High School, Liverpool (1901–1904) and was a fellow at Bryn Mawr College (1904–1905).

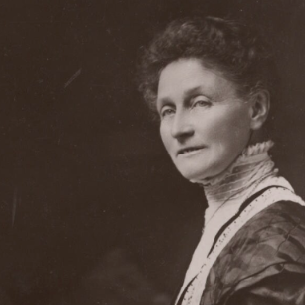
Amy's mother, Lilian Hicks (by Lena Connell)

Bull's mother, Lilian Hicks, had been associated with the suffrage cause since Amy was a young girl. They were both members by 1902 of the Central Society for Women's Suffrage and they were soon joining celebrations of civil disobedience in pursuit of their cause. By 1907 they were both in the Women's Freedom League and Bull was serving as a secretary. Bull was imprisoned for three weeks for obstruction that year.

In about 1909 the Women's Freedom League (WFL) published a postcard which featured Lilian Hicks. Bull and her mother were arrested on Black Friday on 18 November 1910.

Bull was a member of the Women's Tax Resistance League which sought to resist paying tax to a government that only men had voted for. In 1912 she was smashing West End shop windows as part of a Women's Social and Political Union demonstration. She was sentenced in March 1912 and she was jailed for four months during which time she went on hunger strike and was force fed. She and Sylvia Pankhurst founded the East London branch of the Women's Social and Political Union on 27 May 1913 and in the same year her mother was secretary of the Hampstead United Suffragists.

The first World War started in 1914 and Bull served in the Women's Volunteer Reserve which had been founded by suffragettes to help the war effort.

She married John Major Bull on 4 August 1927. She went on be a rural district councillor and to lecture on home produced food to meetings of Women's Institutes. She was awarded an MBE in 1948.

Bull died in Little Baddow in 1953.
