= Kate Williams Evans =

Welsh suffragette, activist and campaigner for women's rights

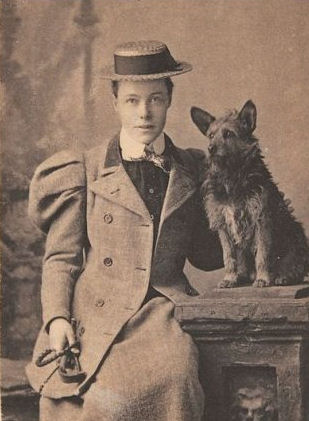
Kate Williams Evans c. 1890

Kate Williams Evans (1 October 1866 – 2 February 1961) was a Welsh suffragette, activist and campaigner for women's rights. She was imprisoned in Holloway Prison where she went on hunger strike for which she received the Women's Social and Political Union's (WSPU) Hunger Strike Medal which was sold to Amgueddfa Cymru – National Museum Wales for £48,640 in 2018.

== Life ==
Kate Williams Evans was born in 1866 in Llanymynech in Montgomeryshire, to William Dorsett Evans (1832-1892), a successful farmer, and Mary née Williams (1838-). She had four siblings: one brother and three sisters. In 1891 she was living with her family on the family estate Bod Gwilym at Llansantffraid-ym-Mechain.

In her youth she developed an interest in politics and during a stay in Paris during the 1890s she became interested in women's suffrage. On her return home she met members of the Women's Social and Political Union (WSPU) and by her mid 30s Evans was an active member of the WSPU and became a suffragette, to the disappointment of her parents. In March 1912 she was arrested for "malicious damage" for breaking the windows of government offices in London along with other suffragettes, including Caroline Lowder Downing and Edith Downing, for which she was sentenced to 54 days hard labour in Holloway Prison where she went on hunger strike leading her to being awarded the WSPU's Hunger Strike Medal and Holloway brooch on her release from prison. Her Hunger Strike Medal has two silver bars, one of which is engraved '4 March 1912'.

In August 1913 chaired a meeting of the Women's Freedom League (WFL) in Llansantffraid-ym-Mechain where she gave an address on the differences between the Women's Social and Political Union and the WFL in terms of policy and militancy; it has been conjectured that after her experiences in Holloway Prison that she may have left the WSPU to join the less militant WFL. Certainly, she maintained an involvement in the WFL branch of the WFL and was the chairperson until at least 1917.

By 1939 Evans and her sister Margaret were living together at their parents' estate Bod Gwylim in Wales, where they remained until their deaths. Kate Williams Evans died in February 1961 at Oswestry and District General Hospital in Oswestry; her ashes are buried with those of her sister Margaret. In her will she left £13,749 0s 1d.

== 2018 auction ==
In 2018 her Hunger Strike Medal, Holloway brooch and her archive of papers including her Metropolitan Police arrest warrant, an autograph book containing the pencilled signatures with hand-written pencil autographs from such suffragettes as Emily Davison, Emmeline Pankhurst and Sarah Benett were sold at auction. Also included in the sale was a rare copy of Holloway Jingles - a collection of poems written by the imprisoned suffragettes to which Evans contributed three poems, two of which are called "Who?" and the third "The Cleaners of Holloway", and a signed letter from Emmeline Pankhurst. The sale lot included a hand-written letter from fellow inmate and suffragette Sarah Benett to her maid Jane which reads: 'Miss Evans will be my guest till she is a little stronger. She has been starving so treat her as an invalid...' The collection was sold on behalf of Evans' family.

The collection was purchased for £48,640 and the Hunger Strike Medal is now held in the collection of Amgueddfa Cymru – Museum Wales.
