= Pleasance Pendred =

British campaigner for women's rights

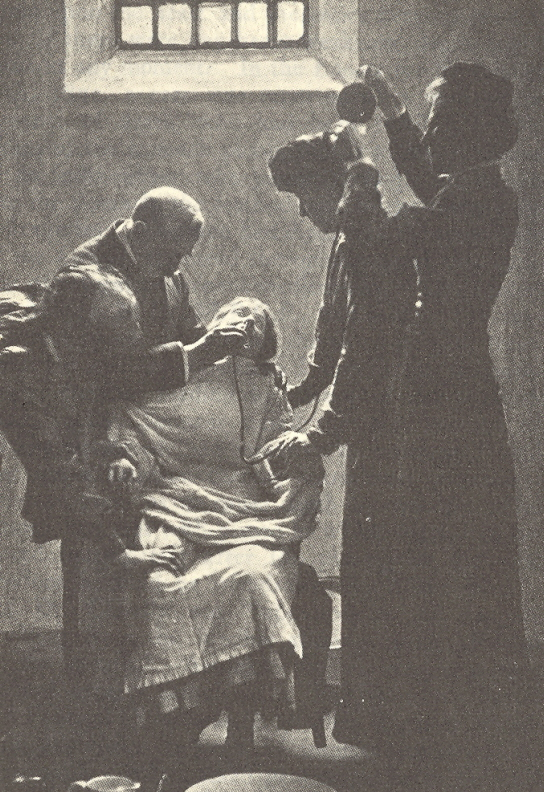
A suffragette is force-fed in HM Prison Holloway in the UK during hunger strikes for women's suffrage; Pendred endured this for two months.

Pleasance Pendred (15 July 1864 – 29 September 1948) was a British campaigner for women's rights, an activist and suffragette who during her imprisonment in Holloway Prison went on hunger strike as a consequence of which she was force-fed.

== Early life ==
She was born on 15 July 1864 as Kate Pleasance Jackson in Lutterworth in Leicestershire, the daughter of Thomas Jackson, a grocer, and Elizabeth née Pendred; her late maternal aunt was called Pleasance Pendred (1843–1858). In 1881 aged 16 Kate Jackson was a Pupil Teacher at Osney House School in Oxford. By 1891 she and her now widowed father were boarders at 46 Langdon Park Road in Hornsey; by this time she was a School Board Teacher. Ten years later Kate Pleasance Jackson was still living at Langdon Park Road, and here she was to stay until at least 1927.

== Career and initial involvement in women's suffrage ==
For 25 years she worked as a teacher in London but was an active member of the Hornsey branch of the Women's Social and Political Union which is probably why she adopted the name 'Pleasance Pendred' as her employers were not likely to look favourably on her activities on behalf of women's suffrage. From 1909 until 1910 as 'Miss Jackson' she was the Literature Secretary for the Hornsey branch of the WSPU (renamed 'North Islington' in summer 1910) but she resigned from this office as stated in the 30 September 1910 issue of The Suffragette. However, she continued to work as a collector of money and object donations for the Hornsey branch of the WSPU until October 1912.

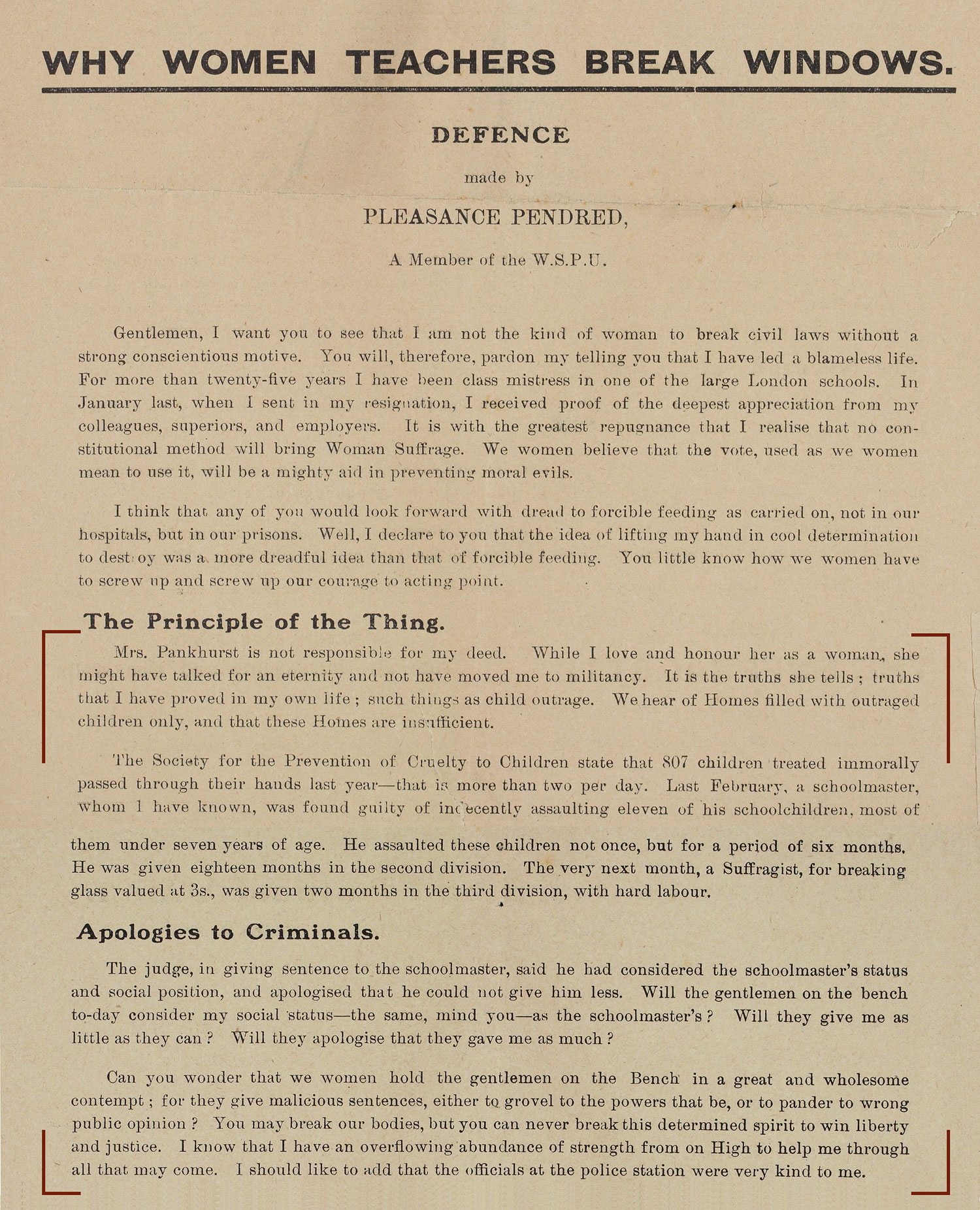
Why Women Teachers Break Windows by Pleasance c. 1912

== Militant action, trial and imprisonment ==
She resigned her teaching post just before she began her militant action for the WSPU on 28 January 1913 when she and three other women smashed the windows of various shops including an antiquities shop at 167 Victoria Street and of government offices in Westminster. During her trial in February 1913 she gave the name Pleasance Pendred and under that name she was sentenced to four months hard labour in Holloway Prison. As she was sentenced Pendred used the dock to complain publicly concerning the treatment received by herself and the other suffragettes arrested with her at Rochester Row Police Station. She stated that the Home Secretary Reginald McKenna had lied when he said that the four arrested women slept on camp beds in their cells and that they were supervised by women warders. She claimed that in fact her cell had a plank bed, the sanitary arrangements were disgusting and that five times during the night a male warder had come into her cell. The jury requested that the Chairman of the Sessions investigate these claims.

In Holloway Pendred went on hunger strike for about two months during which period she was forcibly-fed, suffering illness as a result. The 4 April 1913 issue of The Suffragette recorded: "On her partial recovery, Miss Pendred who is still confined to her bed, continued the hunger strike, and is now being fed by cup." On her release from prison Pendred received a Hunger Strike Medal from the WSPU for her outstanding bravery. On her early release from prison she received a welcome picnic from the Hornsey branch of the WSPU, as recorded in The Suffragette on 11 July 1913.

== Release, death and legacy ==
After her release from prison in 1913 she held a few talks for the North Islington (formerly Hornsey) WSPU branch and is last recorded as a speaker in August 1913. Her article 'Why Women Teachers Break Windows' was published in Woman's Press, with a copy of it being republished in the Daily Herald on 25 February 1913.

She died in Lewes in Sussex in 1948 having never married. Her Holloway brooch and Hunger Strike Medal issued by the WSPU and named to her as Pleasance Pendred was auctioned in 2001, selling for £3,600.
