= Ethel Ayres Purdie =

British accountant and women's rights activist

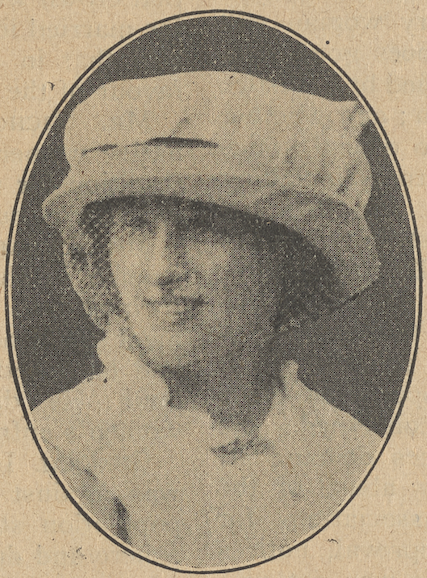
- Ayres Purdie
- Born: Ethel Matilda Ayres; 2 October 1874; Islington, London, England
- Died: 26 March 1923 (aged 48); Westminster, London, England
- Occupation: Chartered accountant
- Known for: Suffragist
- Spouse: Frank Sidney Purdie (m. 1897)

Ethel Ayres Purdie (née Ayres; 2 October 1874 – 26 March 1923) was a chartered accountant and suffragist. She specialised in counselling women and women's suffragist organisations. Purdie was active in the Women's Tax Resistance League which argued that no vote meant no tax. She was the first female registered accountant in the UK.

== Early life ==
Ethel Ayres was born in 1874 in Islington, London. Her father was an engineer toolmaker. After leaving school, she worked for the Post Office in the Telegraph Department.

== Career ==
Ayres Purdie began her suffragist work in 1894 at a trade union protest against the treatment of female telegraphists. The telegraphists contributed to pension funds that they never received, as the women typically left their jobs when they were married. Ayres' protest wanted women to receive a portion of the money.

After her marriage, she studied accountancy at the Society of Arts. Ayres Purdie opened her accountancy firm, which she named The Women Taxpayer's Agenc, in 1908. In 1909, she finally became a member of the London Association of Accountants. In doing so, she became the first female registered accountant in the United Kingdom. Her accountancy firm advertised in many women's papers, including Common Cause, Votes for Women and The Vote. The adverts encouraged women to collect a portion of their income tax, and argued against discrimination particularly from husbands who taxed their wives. Ayres Purdie was the only woman allowed to represent clients in front of the Special Commissioners of Income Tax. In 1912, her accountancy firm was vandalised by suffragettes, who argued that the inclusion of women in the firm's name was discriminatory.

Ayres Purdie was the auditor for the Women's Freedom League, in particular she campaigned for more women in the accountancy industry. She was also an organiser of the Women's Tax Resistance League, which encouraged women not to pay taxes on principle, and provided assistance for them when faced with fines and prison sentences for not paying taxes.

== Personal life and death ==
Ayres Purdie married Frank Sidney Purdie, a commercial traveller to a silversmith, on 16 June 1897, and they had two sons, who were born in 1901 and 1902.

On 26 March 1923, she died by suicide by jumping in front of a train at Covent Garden underground railway station. Ayres Purdie was declared dead at Charing Cross Hospital, aged 48. According to the Oxford Dictionary of National Biography, "Her state of mind had been disturbed by the fear that she was losing her mental powers."

== Legacy ==
In 2024, English Heritage approved a Blue Plaque being unveiled to commemorate Ayres Purdie.

== Publications ==
- Married Women & Tax Resistance (pamphlet), Women's Tax Resistance League, 1910
- Echoes, The Englishwoman, vol. 32, 1911, pp. 224–8
- A red tape comedy, The Vote, vol. VII, no 160, 16 November 1912
- A red tape comedy II, The Vote, vol. VII, no 161, 23 November 1912
- A red tape comedy III, The Vote, vol. VII, no 162, 30 November 1912
- Married Women & Income Tax (pamphlet), Women's Tax Resistance League, 1913
