= Ethel Thomas =

English botanist

- Born: Ethel Nancy Miles Thomas; 4 October 1876; Islington, London, England
- Died: 28 August 1944 (aged 67); Woking, Surrey, England
- Other name: Ethel Hyndman
- Scientific career
- Fields: Botany

Ethel Nancy Miles Thomas (4 October 1876 – 28 August 1944) was a British botanist, best known for her work on double fertilisation in flowering plants as the first British person to publish on the topic. Thomas studied at University College London, largely as a research apprentice to Ethel Sargant, receiving her BSc in 1905. She joined Bedford College and soon became head of the newly formed botany department. Thomas left the Bedford College in 1913, subsequently holding roles at University of South Wales, National Museum of Wales and in the Women's Land Army, before settling at University College, Leicester.

== Biography ==
Ethel Nancy Miles Thomas was born on 4 October 1876 in Islington, London. Her parents were David Miles Thomas, a tutor, and his wife Mary. Initially educated at home, she went on to attend Highbury Fields School (then Mayo High School) in Islington.

In 1897, Thomas began studying botany at University College London and in the same year began a four-year research apprenticeship to the botanist, Ethel Sargant. Whilst acting as a research assistant, she attended botany lectures given by John Bretland Farmer at Royal College of Science and acted as president of the women student's union for University College London. Thomas published her first papers on botany in 1900, before she completed her undergraduate studies and received her BSc from University College in 1905.

In 1907, Thomas joined Bedford College as an assistant lecturer and when the college created a botany department in 1908, Thomas was appointed its head. In the same year, she was elected a fellow of the Linnean Society of London and served as a member of its council from 1910 to 1915. In 1912, she was awarded the role of Reader in Botany at University of London in recognition of her work, a position which she held at the same time as her Bedford College role. When Bedford College moved to Regent's Park in 1913, Thomas designed the botany garden and started plans for a plant physiology laboratory.

Thomas received her DSc from University College London in 1915, where she was also recognised with a fellowship. The following year, Thomas was dismissed from Bedford College by Margaret Tuke, the college's principal after a period of animosity over a difference in their approaches. She became an inspector for the Women's Land Army for the remainder of World War I, whilst also researching for the War Office and Medical Research Council.

After the end of World War I, Thomas took a temporary role as acting head of University College of South Wales's (now Cardiff University) botany department for a year, before spending two years as keeper of the botany department for National Museum of Wales. In 1923, Thomas joined the newly established University College, Leicester, building the biology program from scratch. She set up a botany laboratory, the first laboratory at the University. She remained as head of the biology department at University College Leicester until she retired in 1937.

In 1933, Thomas married a barrister, Hugh Hyndman, but was left widowed the following year. She was a life member of the British Association and served as vice-president of its botany arm, 'Section K'. After retirement, Thomas carried on her research from rooms in Westfield College, but stopped in 1940 due to poor health. She suffered heart failure and died on 28 August 1944.

== Research ==
Thomas is noted for investigations on flowering plants and was the first person in Britain to publish information about their double fertilisation. She also worked extensively on her theory about double leaf-trace by studying both flowering and non-flowering seed producing plants.
