= Anna Lewis (suffragette) =

British suffragette (1889–1976)

- Born: Beatrice Anna Lewis; 1889
- Died: 1976 (aged 86–87); Worthing, England
- Organisation(s): Women's Social and Political Union
- Known for: Suffragette activism and going on hunger strike
- Children: 4
- Awards: Holloway Brooch
- Honours: Hunger Strike Medail 'for Valour' 10 February 1914

Anna Lewis (1889–1976) was a British suffragette, member of the militant Women's Social and Political Union. Lewis was imprisoned at least three times, went on hunger strike and was force-fed by the authorities, fighting the cause of women's rights to vote. Lewis was awarded the Holloway brooch (twice) and the WPSU Hunger Strike Medal on 10 February 1914 "for Valour". Her medals were auctioned to a private buyer for over £27,000, one of the highest prices for such items in May 2019.

== Family ==
Beatrice Anna Lewis was born in 1889 and grew up in Holt, in Wales, and she died at the age of 87, in Worthing, England, in 1976. Lewis had a sister and four children, at least two daughters, one of whom described Lewis as "a woman born before her time". Lewis had resented the limitations of being a female in that era, and her husband served in the Royal Air Force and had chosen to travel unaccompanied overseas. Lewis had also been given more children than was recommended on health advice, and her husband had also said '"I tell you what I think you need to know my dear".

== Suffrage activism ==
Lewis joined the militant suffragette movement, the Women's Social and Political Union (WSPU) and took a leading part in protests which were violently stopped by the Metropolitan Police, and she was charged and imprisoned at least twice. Lewis chained herself to railings. WPSU awarded her the Holloway brooch, a silver portcullis designed by Sylvia Pankhurst, and made by Toye and Co, in the shape of the House of Commons portcullis and the prisoner arrow symbols in the WSPU colours; purple for dignity, green for hope and white for purity.

== Hunger Strike Medal ==
Lewis was a recipient of the Hunger Strike Medal, awarded by Emmeline Pankhurst in a special ceremony in 1914. Lewis's medal had the date of her hunger strike 10 February 1914 engraved and the leather box had the citation:

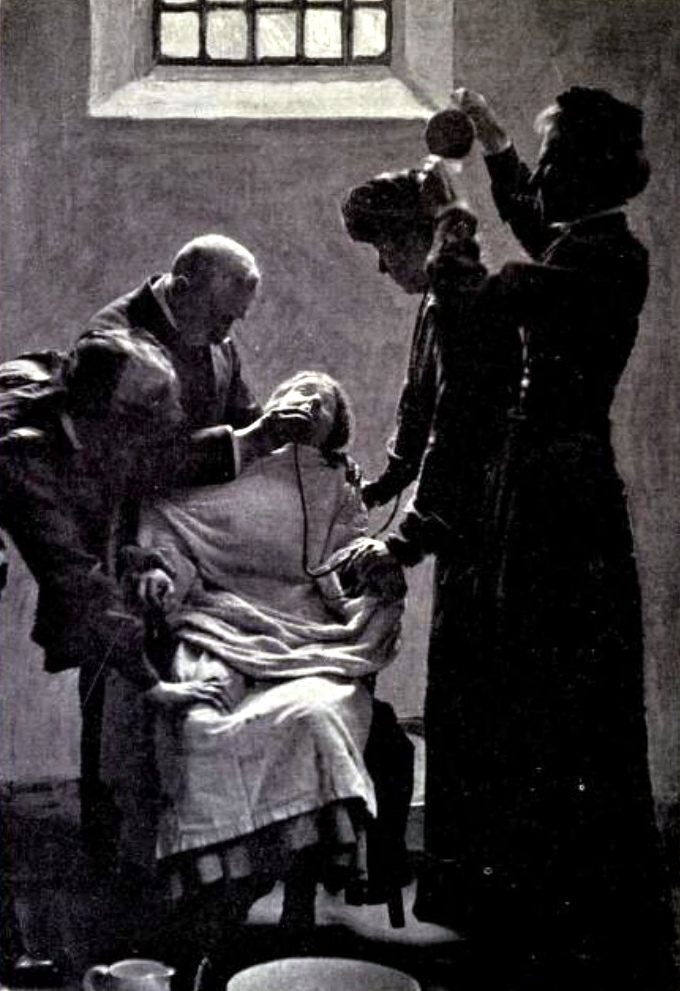
force feeding of suffragette

‘Presented to Anna Lewis, by the Women’s Social and Political Union in recognition of a gallant action, whereby through endurance to the last extremity of hunger and hardship, A great principle of political justice was vindicated’

Lewis was a friend of Miss De Pass, a fellow suffragette, and she was included in the Roll of Honour of the suffragette movement (as Ann Lewis). Lewis set up a home for other women who were protestors who had suffered ill-health from this treatment, and she herself had permanent damage to her throat from force-feeding.

Lewis also attended the annual memorial services for suffragettes.
