= Bertha Bacon =

British suffragette and tax resister(1866–1922)

- Born: 1866; Abbess Roding, Essex, England
- Died: 19 April 1922 (aged 55–56); Hornchurch, Essex, England
- Organization(s): Women's Social and Political Union, Women's Tax Resistance League

Bertha Bacon (née Thurgood, 1866–19 April 1922) was a British suffragette and member of the Women's Tax Resistance League.

== Life ==
Bacon was born in 1866 in Abbess Roding, Essex. She was one of eight children.

Bacon was a suffragette and member of the Wimbledon branch of the Women's Social and Political Union (WSPU). She was arrested on 24 November 1911, for smashing three windows of the dining room at the Westminster Palace Hotel, valued at £5. The Bishop of Gloucester had been sitting next to a window that was smashed. She explained that she had broken the windows because "It was my duty. There is a wave of feminine indignation sweeping over the country and we cannot help it." She was fined £5 or twenty one days imprisonment and £4 damages.

After her release from prison, she also became a member of the Women's Tax Resistance League, which used tax resistance to protest against the disenfranchisement of women. In April 1913, in Romford, Essex, a gold ring set with a coral and two pearls was auctioned off to pay her tax bill.

She died in 1922 at Hornchurch, Essex.
