= Ethel Sargant =

British botanist (1863–1918)

Ethel Sargant FLS
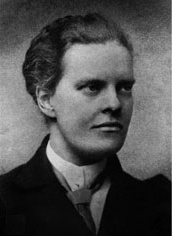
- Born: 28 October 1863
- Died: 16 January 1918 (aged 54); Sidmouth, England
- Education: Girton College, Cambridge
- Known for: Significant research in botanical science
- Scientific career
- Fields: Cytology and morphology of plants

Ethel Sargant FLS (28 October 1863 – 16 January 1918) was a British botanist who studied both the cytology and morphology of plants. She was one of the first female members of the Linnean Society and the first woman to serve on their council. She was the first woman to preside over a Section of the British Association. At Cambridge, she was elected an Honorary Fellow of Girton College in 1913 and also became President of the British Federation of University Women from 1913 until 1918.

== Early life ==
Sargant was born on 28 October 1863. She was the third daughter of barrister Henry Sargant and his wife Catherine Emma Beale. She studied at North London Collegiate School under Frances Mary Buss at a time when all girls schools were considered an "adventurous experiment" and from 1881 to 1885 at Girton College, Cambridge where she was briefly Captain of the Fire Brigade. Her sister Mary Sargant Florence was a painter and feminist, while her brother Sir Charles Sargant was a senior judge.

== Career ==
A list of Sargant's publications is provided in an article in the Journal of the Society for the Bibliography of Natural History.

She worked with Margaret Jane Benson, head of the Department of Botany at Royal Holloway College, and travelled with her throughout Europe in 1897 to acquire equipment and knowledge to set up that school's laboratory. From 1892 to 1893, she worked with Professor D.H. Scott at the Jodrell Laboratory in Kew Gardens, where she investigated the nucleus and the development of the male and female gametes in Lilium martagon .

Sargant spent some years doing botanical work at home while she cared for her mother and sister. To combine her caring responsibilities and academic pursuits, she ran a small laboratory in the grounds of her mother's house in Reigate, which she called "Jodrell Junior" . She employed Ethel Thomas (1897–1901) and Agnes Arber (1902-3) as research assistants. For the following years she specialised in seedling anatomy, giving a course of lectures on botany at the University of London in 1907.

In December 1904, Sargant was elected one of the first women to become a fellow of the Linnean Society of London, and she also became the first female on their council in 1906.

After the deaths of her mother and sister, she moved to live at the Old Rectory in Girton village in 1912. She was elected an Honorary Fellow of Girton College in 1913 and was President of the British Federation of University Women from 1913 until 1918. She was the President of the Botanical Section at the British Association meeting at Birmingham in 1913.

During World War I, she organised the register of university women qualified to do work of national importance, which was afterwards taken over by the Ministry of Labour.

Ethel Sargant died in Sidmouth on 16 January 1918.

== Tax Resistance ==
Sargant was an active member of the Women's Tax Resistance League. In March 1914 several articles of Sargant's property was seized under distraint and auctioned to pay her tax debt of £9 18s. Sargant had refused to pay the King's Taxes for at least a year, as a protest against being taxed for national expenditure without having a vote. The sale became a public event and protest meeting, attended by a considerable crowd of neighbours and attendees from Girton College and Cambridge.

== After death ==
She bequeathed her botanical library and bookcases to Girton College. The Ethel Sargant Studentship for research into Natural Sciences was endowed by friends in her memory in 1919. Some of the reprints and monographs she collected and bound by subject are now housed in the Plant Sciences Library, University of Cambridge. An obituary was written by Agnes Arber.

== See also ==
- Timeline of women in science
