= Holloway brooch =

- Holloway brooch from the UK Parliamentary Collections
- Country: United Kingdom
- Presented by: Women's Social and Political Union

The Holloway brooch was presented by the Women's Social and Political Union (WSPU) to women who had been imprisoned at Holloway Prison for militant suffragette activity. It is also referred to as the "Portcullis badge", the "Holloway Prison brooch" and the "Victoria Cross of the Union".

== Background ==
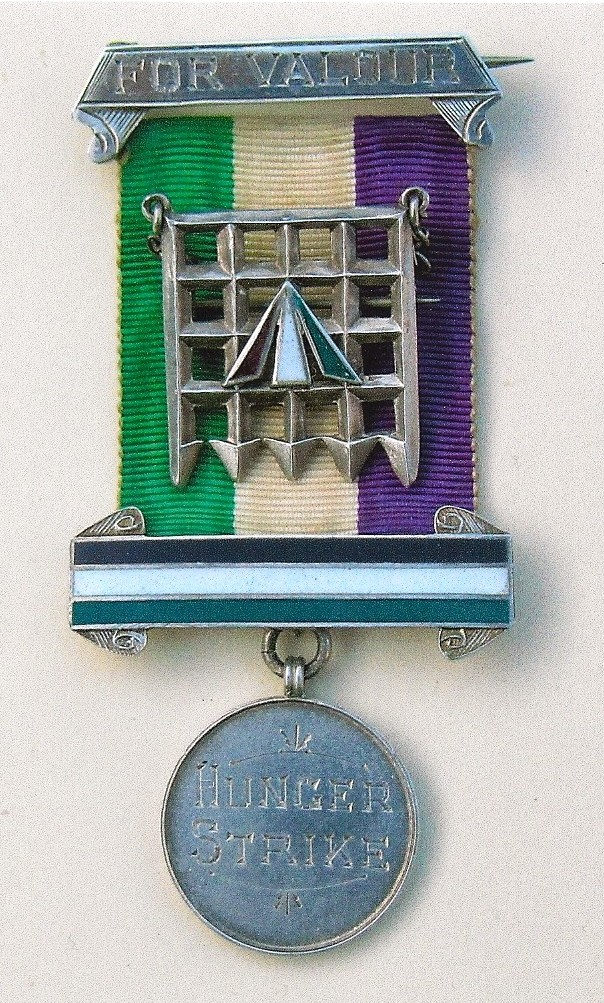
Violet Ann Bland's Hunger Strike Medal and Holloway Brooch

Beginning in 1902 Holloway Prison was a female-only prison in London, England. In the early part of the twentieth century many suffragettes were incarcerated at the prison. As their actions became more militant, the women received more severe sentences. Once in prison the women continued their protests, eventually going on hunger strikes as they demanded to be designated as "political prisoners".

== Holloway brooch ==
The Holloway brooch was designed by Sylvia Pankhurst. Made of silver, it depicts the portcullis symbol of Parliament and a broad arrow, associated with prison uniforms, in purple, white, and green enamel. The brooches were given to suffragettes upon their release from Holloway. The size is one inch by 3/4 of an inch. It was manufactured by Toye & Co London.

On 29 April 1909 the first brooches were distributed at a large meeting at the Albert Hall organised by the WSPU. The first brooches were presented by Christabel Pankhurst and Emmeline Pankhurst, Annie Kenney and Emmeline Pethick-Lawrence.

== Recipients ==
- Dora Beedham
- Sarah Benett
- Violet Ann Bland
- Lady Constance Bulwer-Lytton
- Mabel Capper
- Joan Cather
- Leonora Cohen
- Louie (Louisa) Cullen
- Emily Davison
- Kate Williams Evans
- Theresa Garnett
- Clara Giveen
- Katie Edith Gliddon
- Laura Geraldine Lennox
- Anna Lewis
- Selina Martin
- Edith Bessie New
- Annie Seymour Pearson
- Pleasance Pendred
- Grace Roe
- Amy Sanderson
- Janie Terrero
- Minnie Turner
- Julia Varley
Recipients of the Holloway brooch

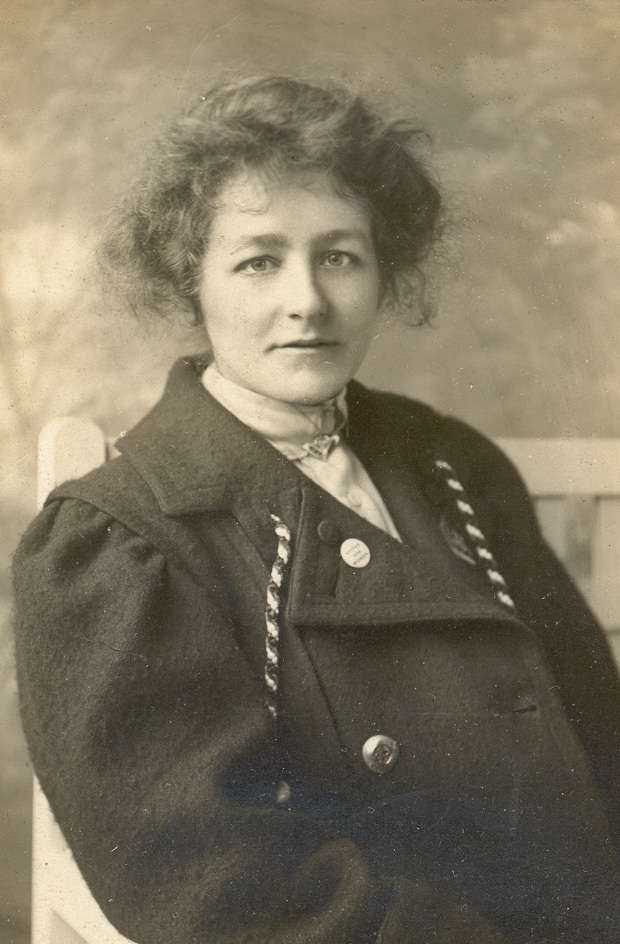
Edith New (1908)

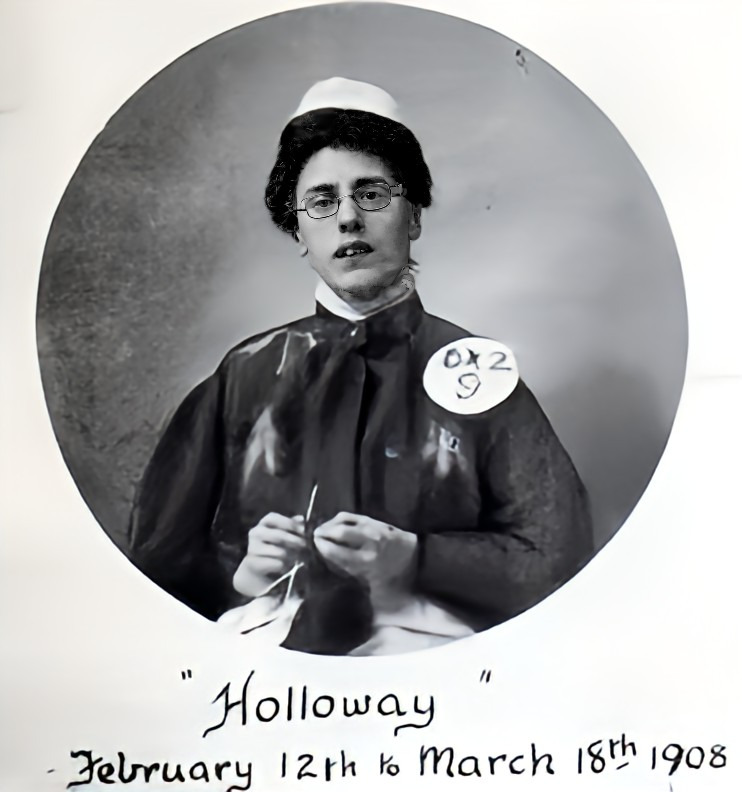
Louie Cullen (1908)

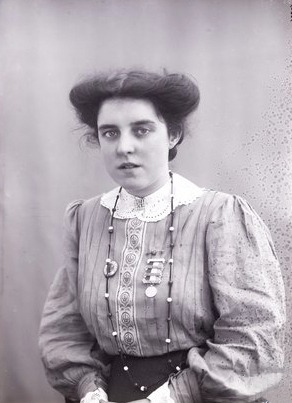
Theresa Garnett (1909)

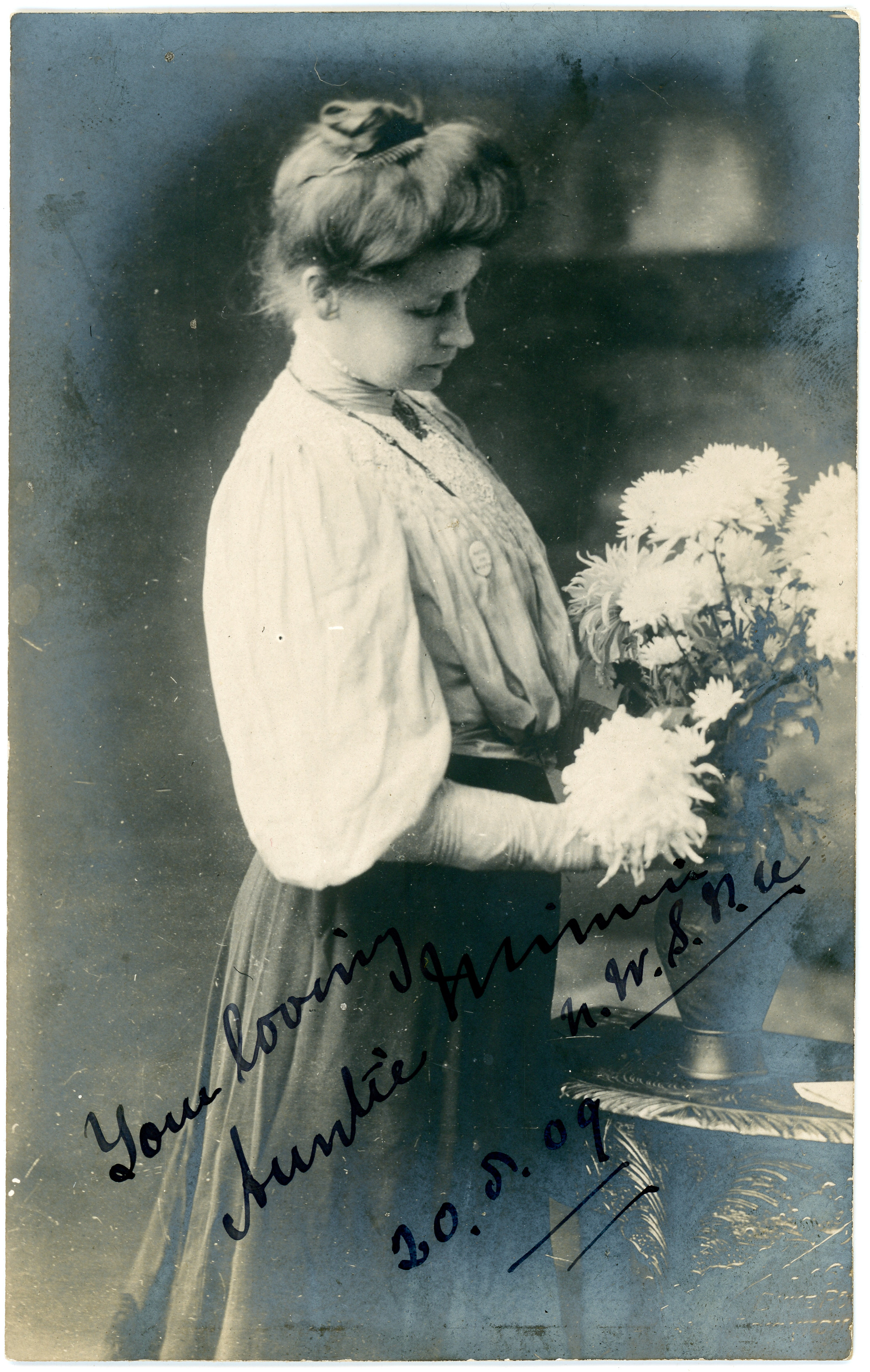
Minnie Turner (1909)

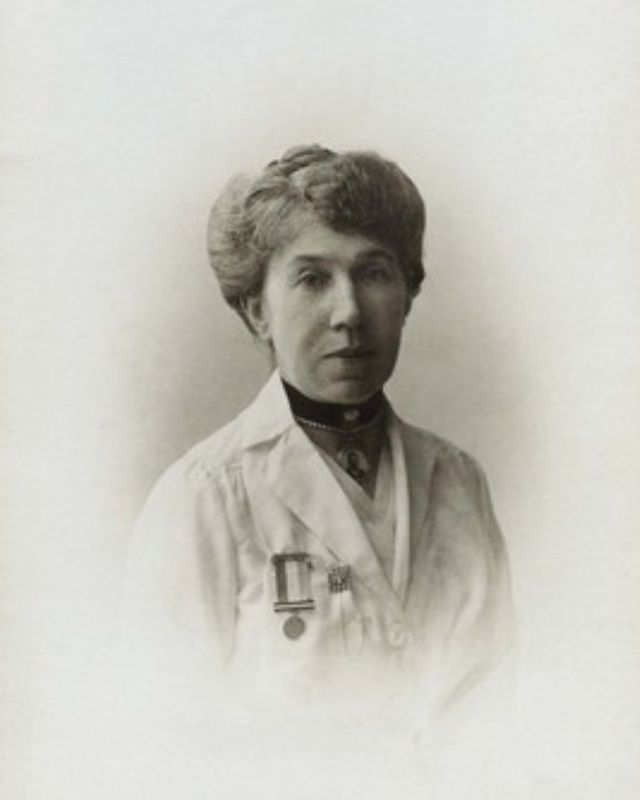
Janie Terrero (1912)

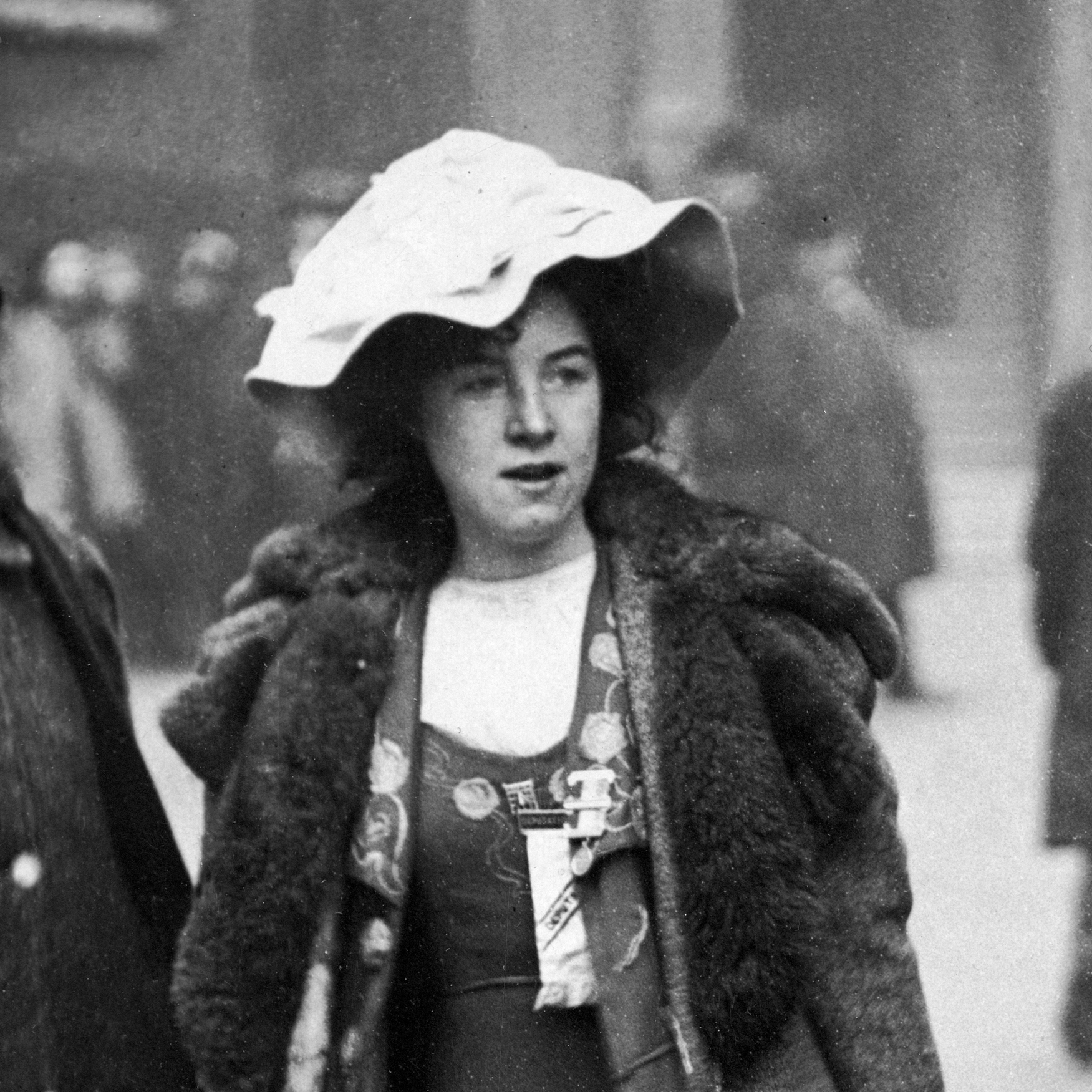
Mabel Capper (1912)

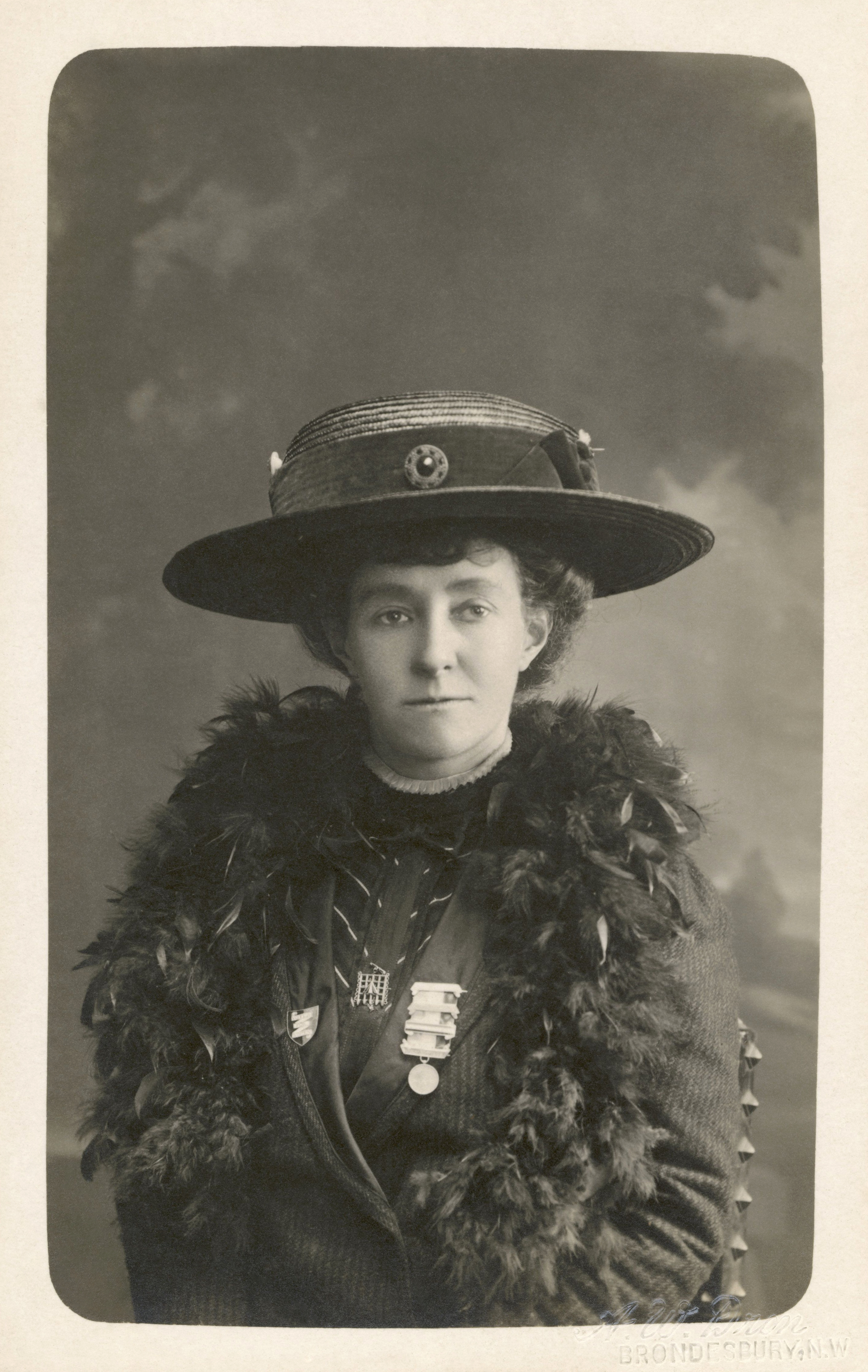
Emily Davison (1913)

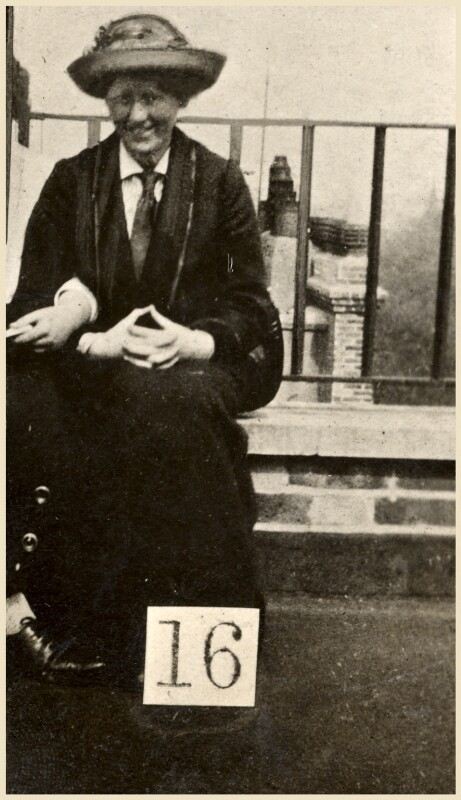
Clara Giveen (1914)

Grace Roe (1914)

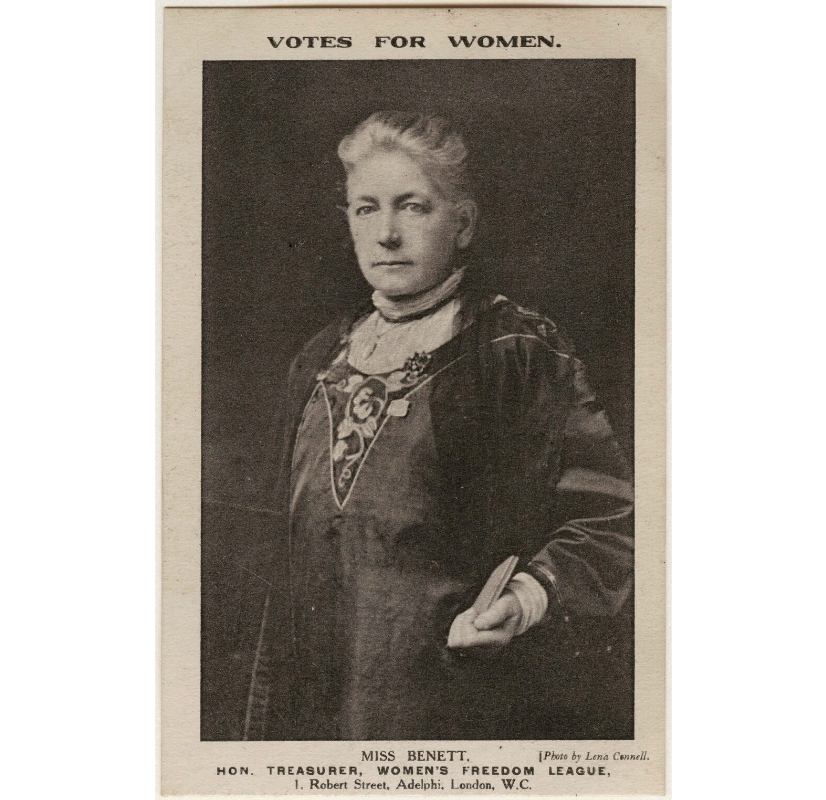
Sarah Bennet (1909)

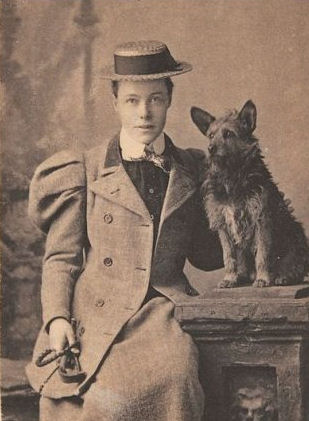
Kate Williams Evans (c1890)

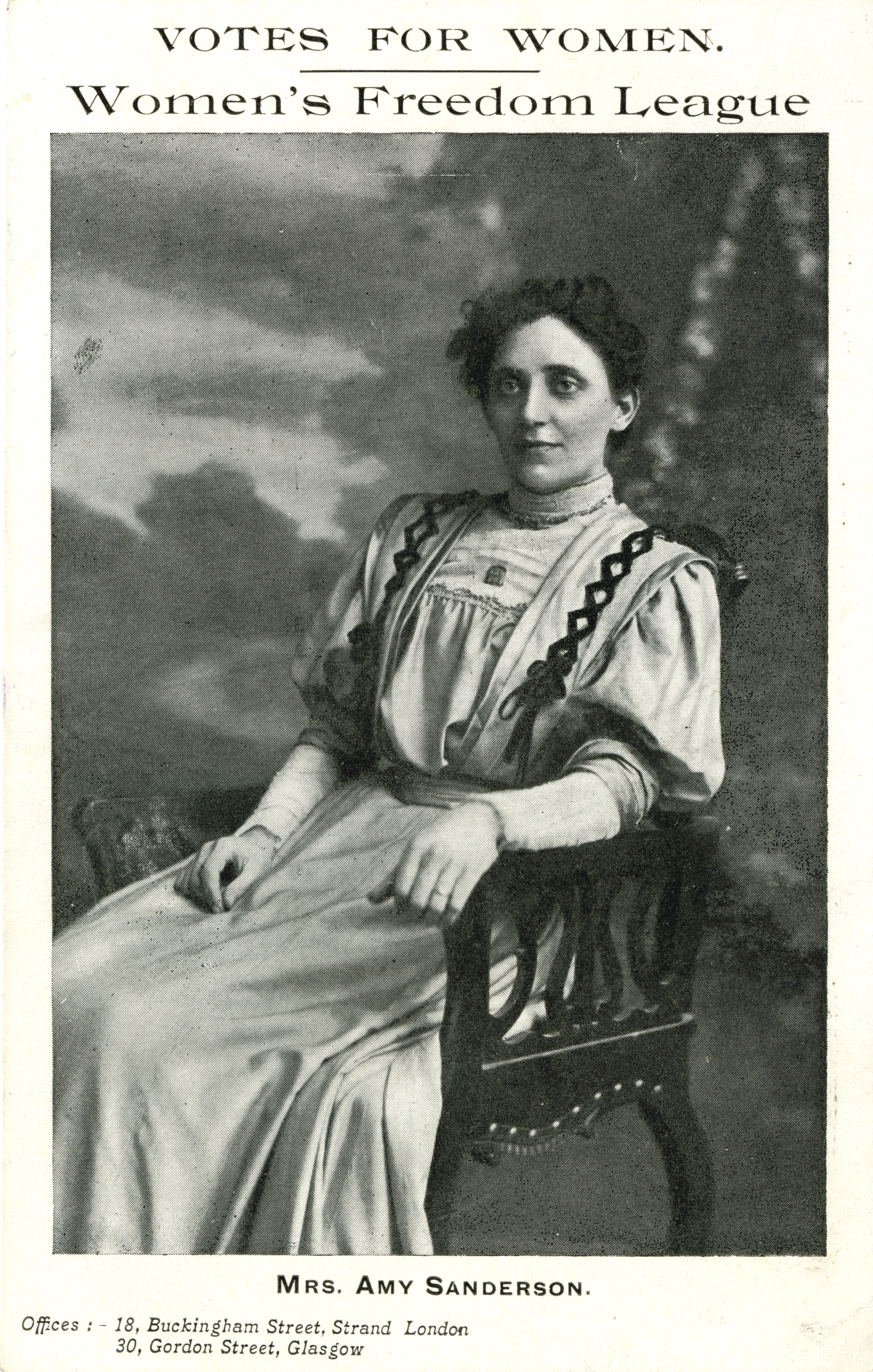
Amy Sanderson (1907)

== See also ==
- Emmeline and Christabel Pankhurst Memorial
- Hunger Strike Medal
- Suffrage jewellery
- The Suffragette Handkerchief
