= Mary Sargant Florence =

British painter

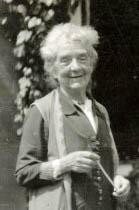
- Born: Emma Mary Sargant; 21 July 1857; London, United Kingdom
- Died: 14 December 1954 (aged 97); Twickenham, United Kingdom
- Education: Slade School of Art
- Occupations: Painter, suffragette
- Spouse: Henry Smyth Florence (m. 1888; died 1891)

Emma Mary Sargant Florence (21 July 1857 – 14 December 1954) was a British painter of figure subjects, mural decorations in fresco and occasional landscapes in watercolour and pastel.

== Biography ==
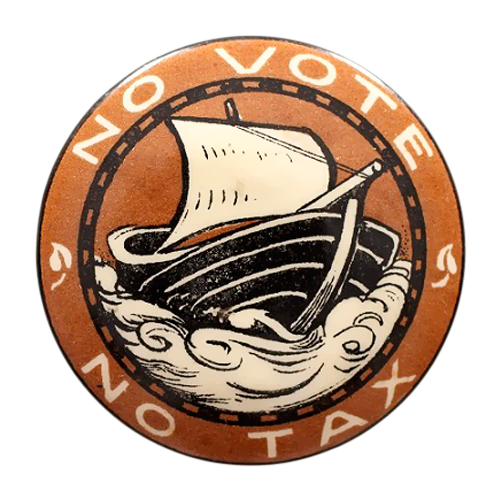
A badge of the Women's Tax Resistance League, with the slogan "No vote, no tax", as designed by Margaret Sargant Florence

Emma Mary Sargant was born in London. Her father was Henry Sargant, a barrister, and her mother was Catherine Emma Beale. Her siblings included the judge Charles Henry Sargant, the botanist Ethel Sargant, the headmaster Walter Lee Sargant and the sculptor Francis William Sargant.

She studied in Paris under Luc-Olivier Merson, and, at the Slade School under Alphonse Legros. She was a member of the New English Art Club and the Society of Painters in Tempera.

In 1888, she married Henry Smyth Florence, an American musician. They had two children: Philip Sargant Florence, the economist, and Alix Strachey, the psychoanalyst and translator of Freud. She lived in Nutley, New Jersey in a carriage house that became a studio used by other local artists.

After her husband drowned in 1891, she moved to Marlow, Buckinghamshire, and had her house, "Lord's Wood" (1899–1900), built, where she lived until 1940. The interior has been altered but was originally designed to have bare brick walls, no doors and no plumbing.

She is known for her works Children at Chess (c.1903), Suffer Little Children to Come unto Me (1913) and Pentecost (c.1913). She painted true fresco decorations at the Old School, Oakham, Rutland (c.1909–14), and at Bournville Junior School near Birmingham (1912–14). Her frescoes at Oakham School were commissioned by the headmaster, her brother Walter Lee Sargant, and illustrate the Arthurian story of Gareth.

She was a suffragist, a supporter of the Women's Tax Resistance League, and a member of the committee for the Hague Peace Congress of 1915. With the Cambridge scholar and editor Charles Kay Ogden, she published the book Militarism versus Feminism (1915) which argued that women had the prerogative and responsibility to combat international militarism. It traced the historical connections between and among militarism, imperialism, slavery, and women's subjection. Militarism, it argued, was the predominant factor in the political, economic, and sexual subjugation of women across a wide swath of human history and the late emergence of demands for women's rights.

In 1940, she wrote Colour Co-Ordination, a work on the history, theory and aesthetics of colour. She edited two volumes of the papers of the Society of Painters in Tempera.

She died at Twickenham, Middlesex.
