= Charles Sargant =

British barrister judge

The Right Honourable Sir Charles Sargant
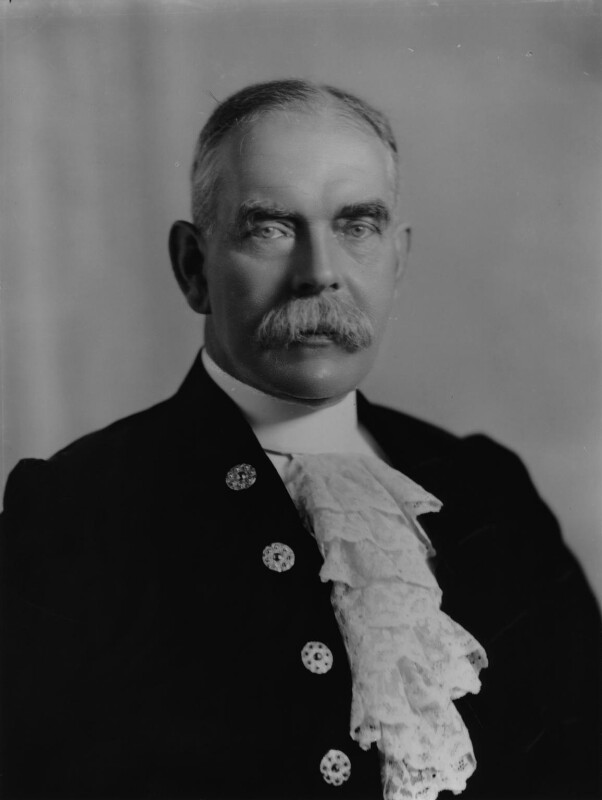
- Sargant in 1913

Lord Justice of Appeal
- In office 12 October 1923 – 14 April 1928
- Preceded by: Sir Robert Younger
- Succeeded by: Sir Frank Russell

Justice of the High Court
- In office 4 March 1913 – 12 October 1923
- Preceded by: Sir Robert Parker
- Succeeded by: Sir Thomas Tomlin

Sir Charles Henry Sargant (20 April 1856 – 23 July 1942) was a British barrister judge who served as Lord Justice of Appeal from 1923 to 1928.

== Biography ==
Sargant was born in London, the son of barrister and conveyancer Henry Sargant, and of Catherine Emma, daughter of Samuel Beale. Among his siblings were the painter Mary Sargant Florence and the botanist Ethel Sargant.

He was a precocious child, and was said to have taught himself to read at the age of three. He was educated at Rugby School and New College, Oxford, where he took first-class honours in classical moderations (1876), second-class honours mathematical moderations (1877), and first-class honours in literae humaniores (1879). He was elected an honorary fellow of his college in 1919.

After spending a year in a solicitors' firm, and reading as a pupil in the chambers of conveyancer Edward Parker Wolstenholme, he was called to the bar at Lincoln's Inn in 1882. After practicing as a conveyancer, he turned to court work. He was a fine draftsman, and two of his pupils, Sir Frederick Francis Liddell and Sir William Graham-Harrison, became First Parliamentary Counsel. He was appointed junior counsel to the Treasury in equity matters in 1908 and was elected a bencher of Lincoln's Inn the same year. He was said to not be very ambitious or industrious, and as a consequence he never took silk.

Sargant was appointed a Justice of the High Court of Justice in 1913 and was assigned to the Chancery Division, receiving the customary knighthood. After the First World War, Sargant chaired the Royal Commission on Awards to Inventors, but was forced to give up the chairmanship upon his promotion to the Court of Appeal.

He was appointed a Lord Justice of Appeal in 1923 and was sworn of the Privy Council. He resigned from the bench in 1928. After his retirement he chaired a Board of Trade committee on patent law and practice and sat occasionally in the Judicial Committee of the Privy Council. He died at his home in Cambridge in 1942 and was buried in the Parish of the Ascension Burial Ground.

== Family ==
Sargant married Amelia Julia, eldest daughter of Dion Gambardella, civil engineer, in 1900; they had one son and two daughters. His son, Sir Henry Edmund Sargant, was a solicitor and president of the Law Society in 1968–69.

== Selected judgments ==
- James Roscoe (Bolton) Ltd v Winder [1915] 1 Ch 62

== Arms ==
Coat of arms of Charles Sargant
| Motto Vigilando |
