= Suffrage jewellery =

Jewellery worn by women's suffragists

Suffrage jewellery refers to jewellery worn by suffragists, including suffragettes, in the years immediately preceding the First World War, ranging from the homemade to the mass-produced to fine, one-off Arts and Crafts pieces. Its primary purpose was to demonstrate its wearer's allegiance to the cause of women's suffrage in the UK. Jewellery was a key mechanism used by British suffragists to identify themselves.

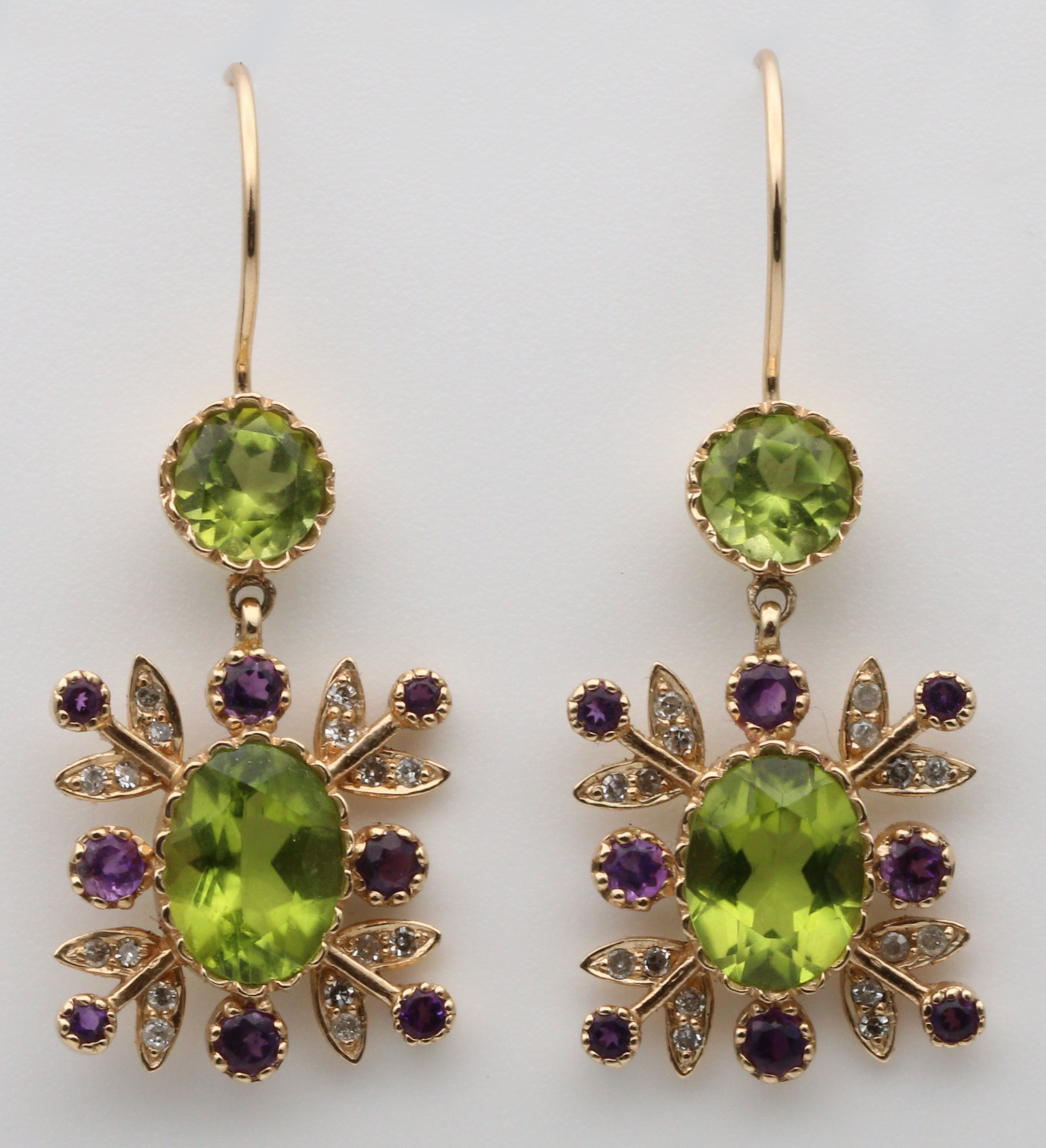
Gold earrings in suffragette colours

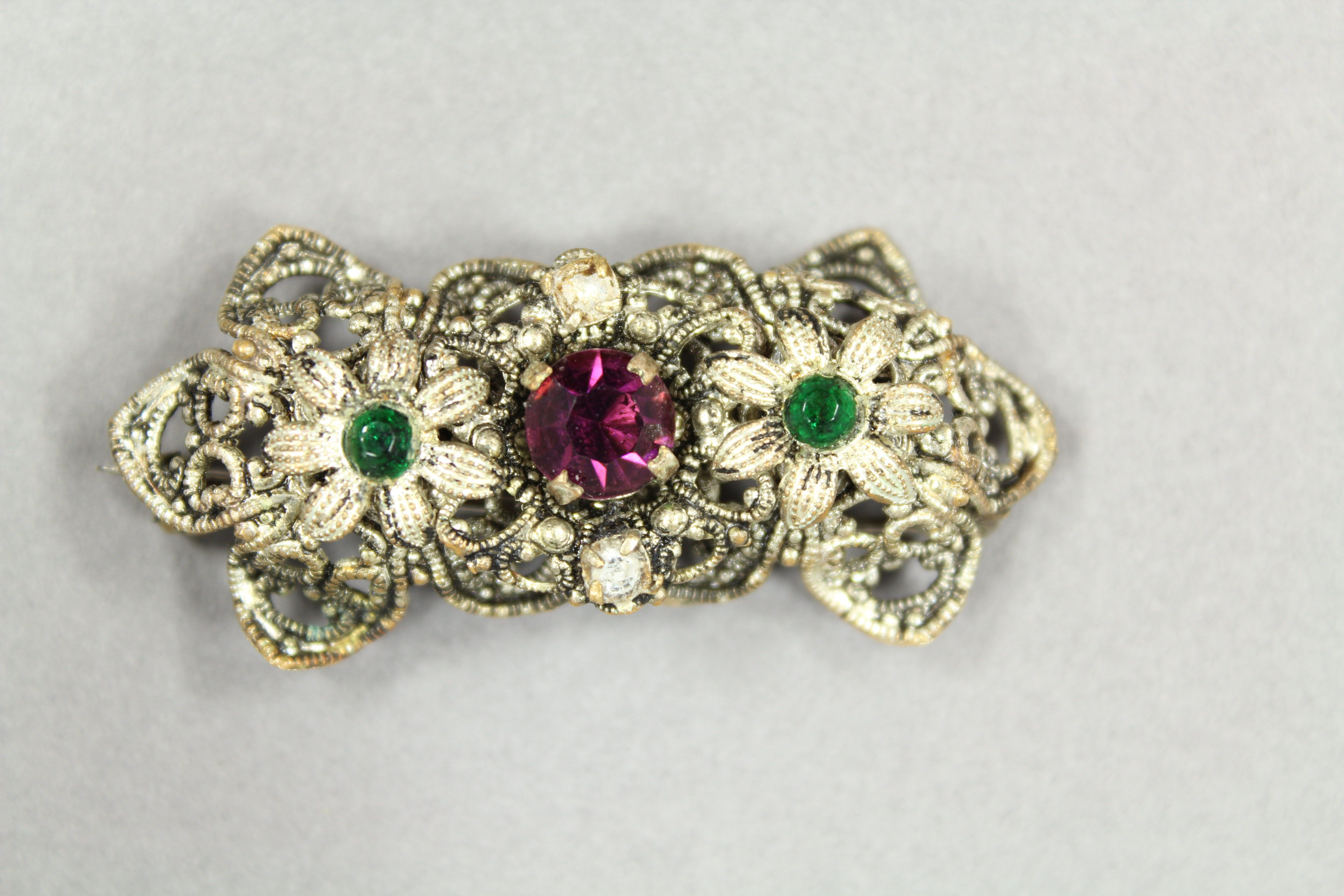
Suffragette brooch

== Visual style ==
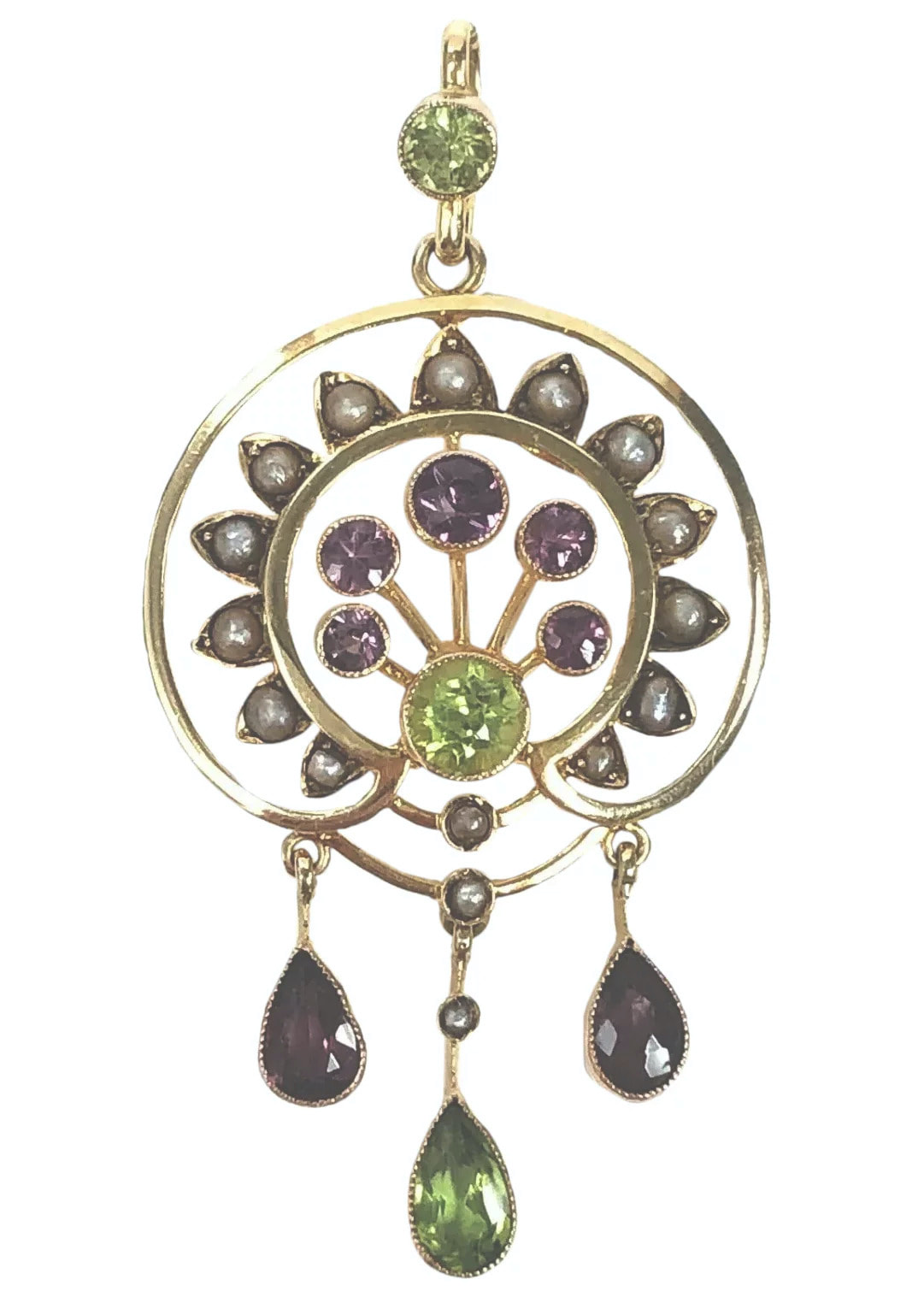
An Art Nouveau era Suffragette pendant set with amethyst, pearl, and peridot.

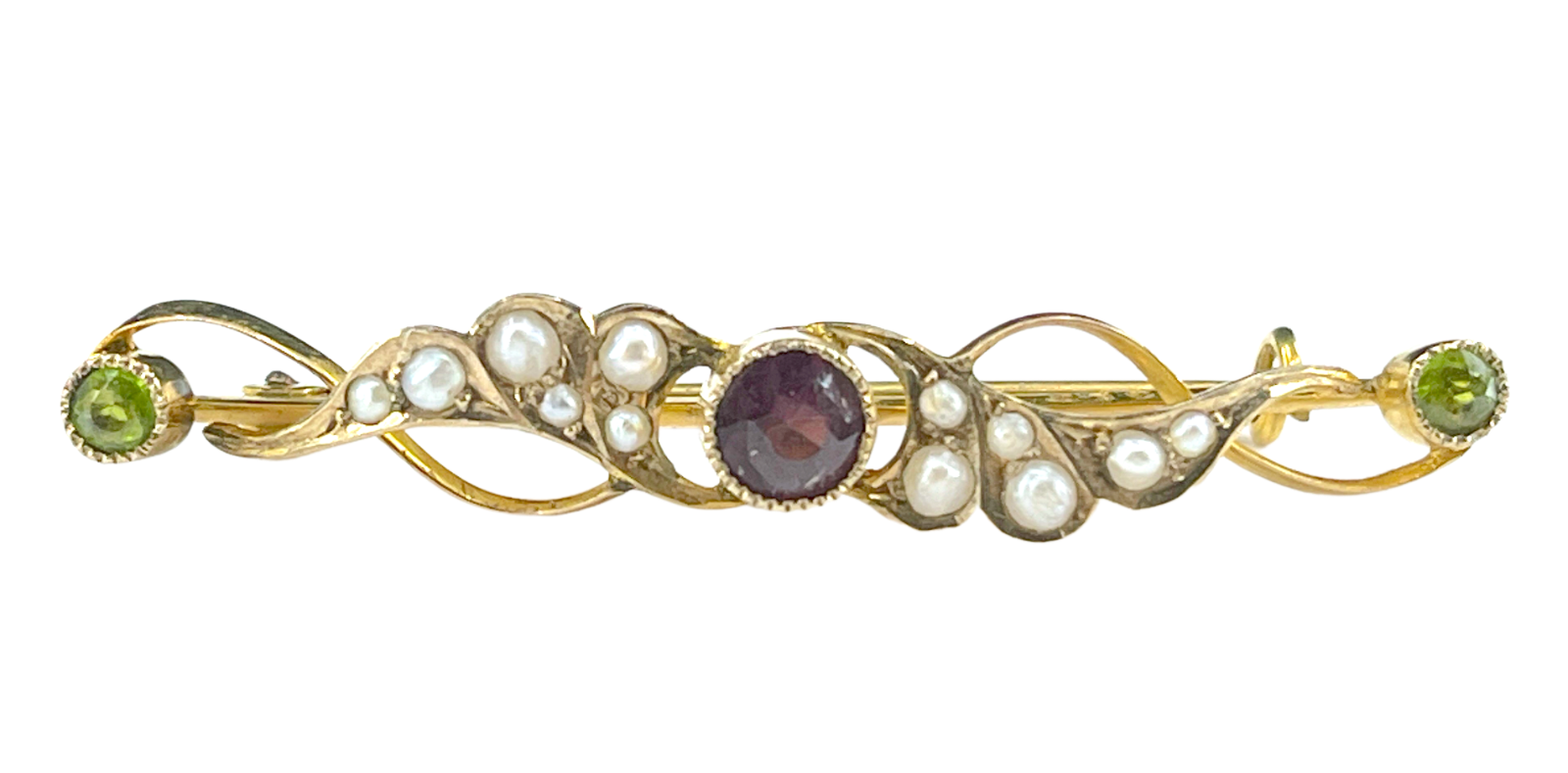
A Suffragette brooch set with amethyst, pearl, and peridot.

The suffragettes, in particular, successfully embraced the language of contemporary fashion - including its emphasis on delicate femininity - as a strategy for increasing the popular appeal of their movement and dodging the stereotype of the 'masculine' women's rights campaigner. As fashion lecturer Cally Blackman notes, "Membership numbers grew, and it became fashionable to identify with the struggle for the vote, even if only by wearing a small piece of jewellery picked out in semi-precious coloured stones or enamel."

Most suffragette jewellery featured the Women's Social and Political Union (WSPU) colours: purple, white, and green. There is some disagreement over who designed this visual branding - either prominent WSPU member Sylvia Pankhurst, who had trained at the Manchester School of Art and the Royal College of Art or Emmeline Pethick-Lawrence, co-editor of Votes for Women. Association with the suffragette cause became so fashionable by 1908 that Mappin & Webb, holders of royal warrants for jewellery since 1897, issued a catalogue of suffragette jewellery.

There appear to have been close links between the suffragettes and the artists of the Arts and Crafts movement.

== Known designers ==
- Sylvia Pankhurst
- Ernestine Mills
- Georgie Gaskin
- Arthur Gaskin
- R C Price

== Themes ==
Popular designs for suffrage jewellery included Sylvia Pankhurst's 'Angel of Freedom' design, hatpins in the shape of an arrow to evoke the prison convict's arrow, and badges displaying photos of the WSPU leaders.

== Authentication and contested artifacts ==
Some writers, particularly those focused on the collectors' market, argue that the significance of jewellery as a means of self-identification with the Suffragette Movement is overstated, due to the popularity of these jewellery colours before and after the period in which suffragettes were most active. However, as scholar Elizabeth Goring notes, the purple-white-green colour combination was deeply symbolic of the Suffragette Movement and the use of these colours "offered a powerful means by which suffragettes could publicly advertise their identity," and would not be construed as merely decorative by others.

The dearth of items identified explicitly as suffragette jewellery in major collections can be partly attributed to the difficulty of using colour alone, without specific date of origin or other documentation, to distinguish this jewellery from other Edwardian jewellery.

Association of medals with the Suffragette Movement is more straightforward, and in 2015 the gallantry medal awarded to Mary Aldham was sold at auction for £23,450. Maud Joachim's WSPU medal was sold at auction at Bonhams on 3 October 2023 for £41,600 and acquired by Glasgow Women's Library following a fundraising campaign and a grant.

The Museum of London permanent collection contains an example of a bespoke piece of suffragette jewellery with clear provenance, a pendant dubbed the Angel of Hope. It was created by Ernestine Mills to commemorate the 1909 release from Holloway Prison of Louise Mary Eates, Secretary of Kensington Women's Social and Political Union.

== See also ==
- Hunger Strike Medal
- Holloway brooch
