= Lilian Hicks =

Suffrage campaigner in the United Kingdom

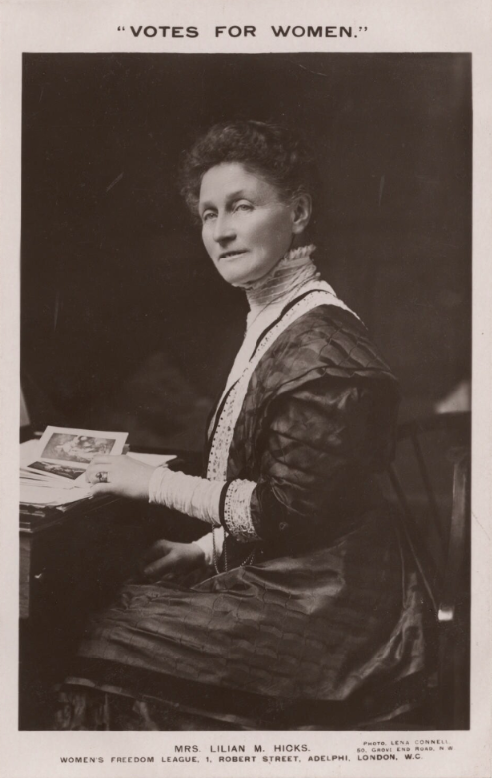
- 1908/9 by Lena Connell for Women's Freedom League
- Born: 1853; Colchester, England, United Kingdom of Great Britain and Ireland
- Died: 1924 (aged 70–71)

Lilian Hicks (1853–1924) was a British campaigner for the vote for agricultural labourers and later Women's suffrage in the United Kingdom. Hicks took an active role in several organisations and was arrested on Black Friday in 1910.

== Life ==
Hicks was born in Colchester in 1853. She and her husband, Charles Hicks, lived at Great Holland Hall where her daughter Amy was born. She campaigned to support agricultural labourers who in the 19th century were denied the vote irrespective of gender because they had no property. The campaign had success when the Representation of the People Act 1884 became law giving the vote to male agricultural labourers.

Hicks went on to campaign for women's suffrage via a number of organisations as the women's cause was splintered by different allegiances. Many would not get involved in criminal acts or they disagreed with the dictatorial approach of Women's Social and Political Union's leadership. Hicks had been associated with the suffrage cause since Amy was a young girl. By 1902 she and her daughter were members by of the Central Society for Women's Suffrage and they were joining celebrations of women's civil disobedience in pursuit of the suffrage cause. She and her daughter joined the Women's Social and Political Union in 1906, but by 1907 they were both in the Women's Freedom League which had split from the suffragettes (the Women's Social and Political Union) and Amy was serving as a secretary for the league. Amy was imprisoned for three weeks in 1907 for obstruction that year.

In about 1909 the Women's Freedom League published a postcard featuring a photo of Hicks taken by Lena Connell. She and her mother were arrested on Black Friday on 18 November 1910.

Black Friday was a suffragette demonstration in London on 18 November 1910, in which 300 women marched to the Houses of Parliament as part of their campaign to secure voting rights for women. Demonstrators clashed with police in Parliament Square and many were arrested and she and her daughter were among them. She and her daughter rejoined the more militant WSPU afterwards.

In 1913 she was the secretary of the Hampstead United Suffragists. She also demonstrated by refusing to pay taxes.
