= Louie Cullen =

British Australian suffragette

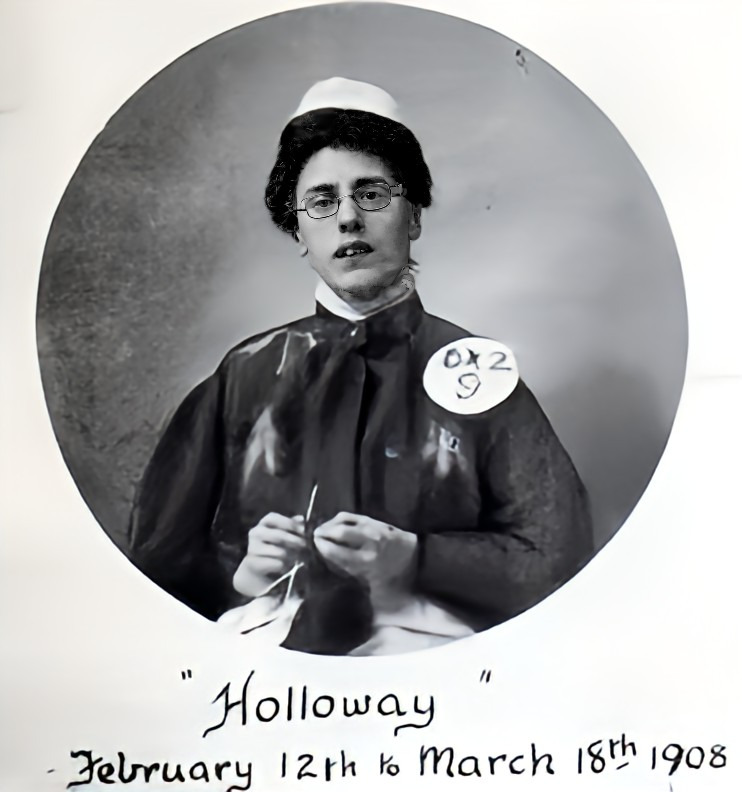
- Cullen in Holloway in 1908
- Born: Louisa Clarissa Mays c. 1876; England
- Died: 24 July 1960 (aged 83–84); Sydney, Australia
- Known for: Suffragette and feminist
- Movement: Women's Social and Political Union
- Awards: Holloway brooch

Louie Cullen (c. 1876 – 24 July 1960) was a British suffragette and hunger striker who emigrated to Australia to continue her feminist activism. She was imprisoned for her activist work, and was awarded a Holloway brooch.

== Life ==
Born Louisa Clarissa Mays in about 1876, she preferred to be called Louie but is sometimes referred to as Louise. She left school at 14 and worked for some time before and, in 1900, she married a working-class man, Joshua William Cullen, who was sympathetic to the call for women to have the right to vote.

=== Suffrage, imprisonment and recognition ===
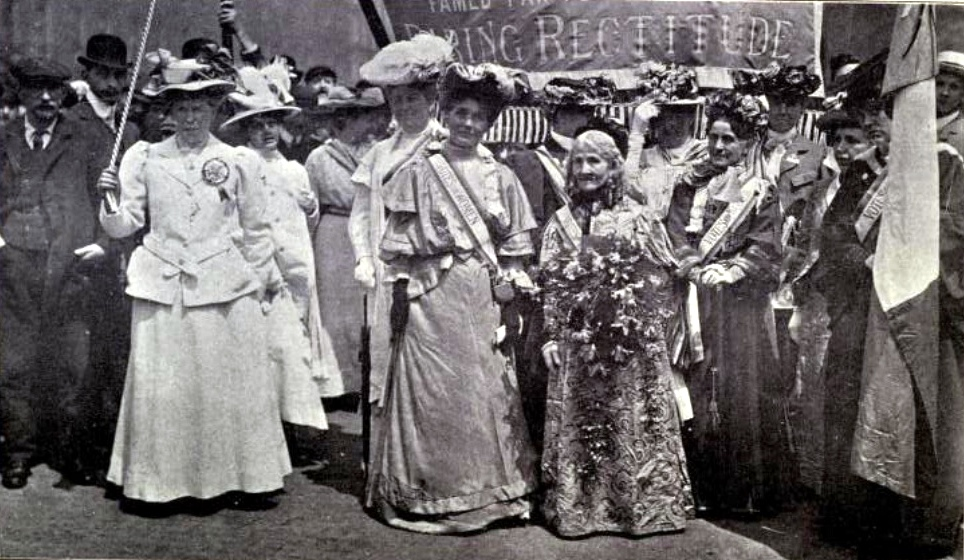
Women's March to Hyde Park, 1908

Cullen became a radical suffragette who joined the Women's Social and Political Union (WSPU) near its start when there were no formal branches. By 1906, she was the organiser of the Kensal branch in London. In that year, Cullen and Hannah Mitchell had smuggled a 'Votes for Women' banner into the House of Commons whilst there with nineteen others and Emmeline Pankhurst and left during the scene caused when they opened up their banners there. Cullen was arrested following the 1908 attempt by suffragettes to rush into the House of Commons hidden in a pantechnicon to get their voices heard on women's suffrage.

Cullen was jailed in Holloway prison and went on a hunger strike for the cause of women's suffrage. Cullen was awarded a Holloway brooch by the WSPU and also spoke on a main platform No. 3 at the Women's Sunday march in Hyde Park on 21 June 1908. Cullen was encouraged to go for a few days to 'rouse' people to have a crowd ready to greet Winston Churchill, on his speech-giving in Norwich, in a 17 July 1909 letter from Christabel Pankhurst.

Cullen's health suffered from her imprisonment, and she and her husband moved in December 1911, initially for a two-year period, to Melbourne, Australia. They ended staying for the rest of their lives in Australia.

=== Activism in Australia ===
The Cullens adopted a child who died soon after their arrival in Australia.

In 1914, Cullen was undertaking speaking engagements on women's rights at the Women's Political Association, Melbourne, convened by Vida Goldstein, saying "women do the scullery work of the world, unorganised and unpaid". Cullen also gave practical assistance to young women alone in the city, setting up the Wayfarers social club to create a welcoming community. Her support for the causes promoted by the Pankhursts continued in her participating in a march and handing Australian Prime Minister Billy Hughes a petition with over 5,000 signatures for the release of Adela Pankhurst Walsh, imprisoned for protesting the price of food.

In the 1930s, the Cullens moved to Sydney and she joined the Suffragette Fellowship, and described as an 'original suffragette' in the Sydney Morning Herald. Cullen supported more women becoming engaged in politics, writing in 1947 to congratulate a Mrs N. A. Parker on her election as the first alderwoman to Molong council. Cullen was widely reported for publicly objecting to the use of 'obey' in the marriage ceremony of the then Princess Elizabeth (now Queen Elizabeth II) to Prince Philip, as 'positively antediluvian'.

In 1953, Cullen donated items to the national collection, to commemorate 50 years of women's right to vote in Australia, including the Holloway Medal, a portcullis brooch with the WPSU ribbon colours of green, white and purple, designed and presented to her by Christabel Pankhurst.

=== Later life and legacy ===
Cullen's husband Joshua, who supported her feminism, died in 1956 at the age of 88. Cullen became known as "the last of the suffragettes". She was interviewed for the People and Women's Day. Cullen had her portrait photograph taken with the WSPU illustrated certificate, wearing her Votes for Women sash in 1958, in the National Library of Australia collection. In her 80th year, she took on officials to leave her home at Lidcombe, Sydney to the Children's Library and Crafts Movement, as a children's centre.

By 1958, Cullen was in a nursing home in Hammondville. She died on 24 July 1960 in Sydney. Her death was reported internationally, including in the Singapore Free Press and the London Daily Telegraph. Cullen had said she would "like the newspapers to know, in the hope that coming young folk will remember how some freedoms are bought."

== Memorabilia ==
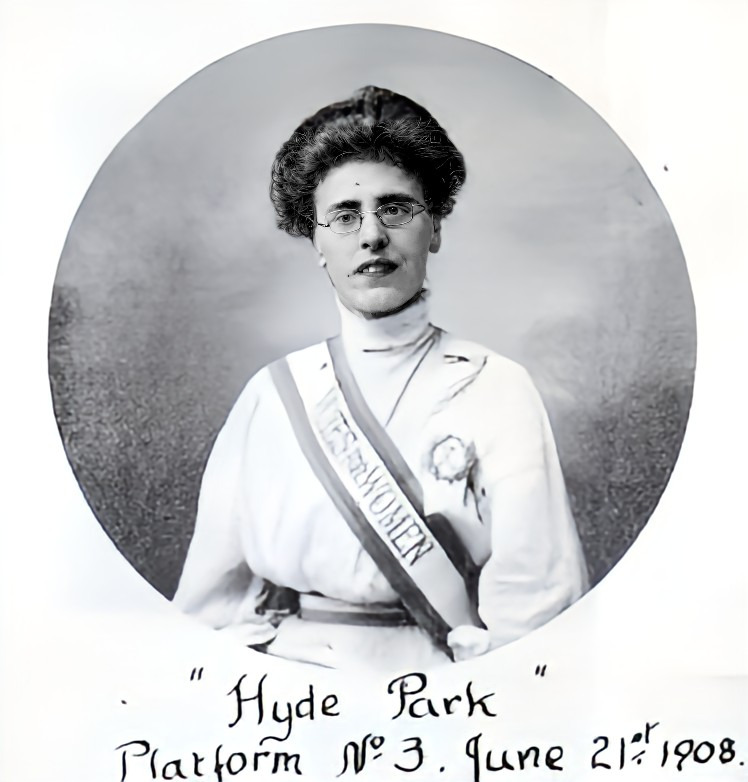
Photo of Cullen with the caption "Hyde Park"

There are artefacts of Cullen's life in the National Library of Australia, in particular among the archive papers of Bessie Rischbieth, feminist and founder of the Australian Federation of Women's Societies (or Voters), who persuaded Cullen to donate her suffragette items to the collection. These include Cullen's sketch of her prison cell, with the caption, "stone walls do not a prison make, nor iron bars a cage." There is also Cullen's Holloway brooch and her WSPU sash, which she is seen wearing in a duo photograph of her both in prison clothing and dressed in white wearing the sash for the Hyde Park Women's March, from her book written in 1959. The collection has the original certificate from Emmeline Pankhurst, honouring Louise Cullen's contribution of "self-forgetfulness and self-conquest, ever ready to obey the call of duty, and to answer to the appeal of the oppressed", which she is holding in her portrait.
