= Elizabeth Wilks =

English suffragist and tax resister (1861–1956)

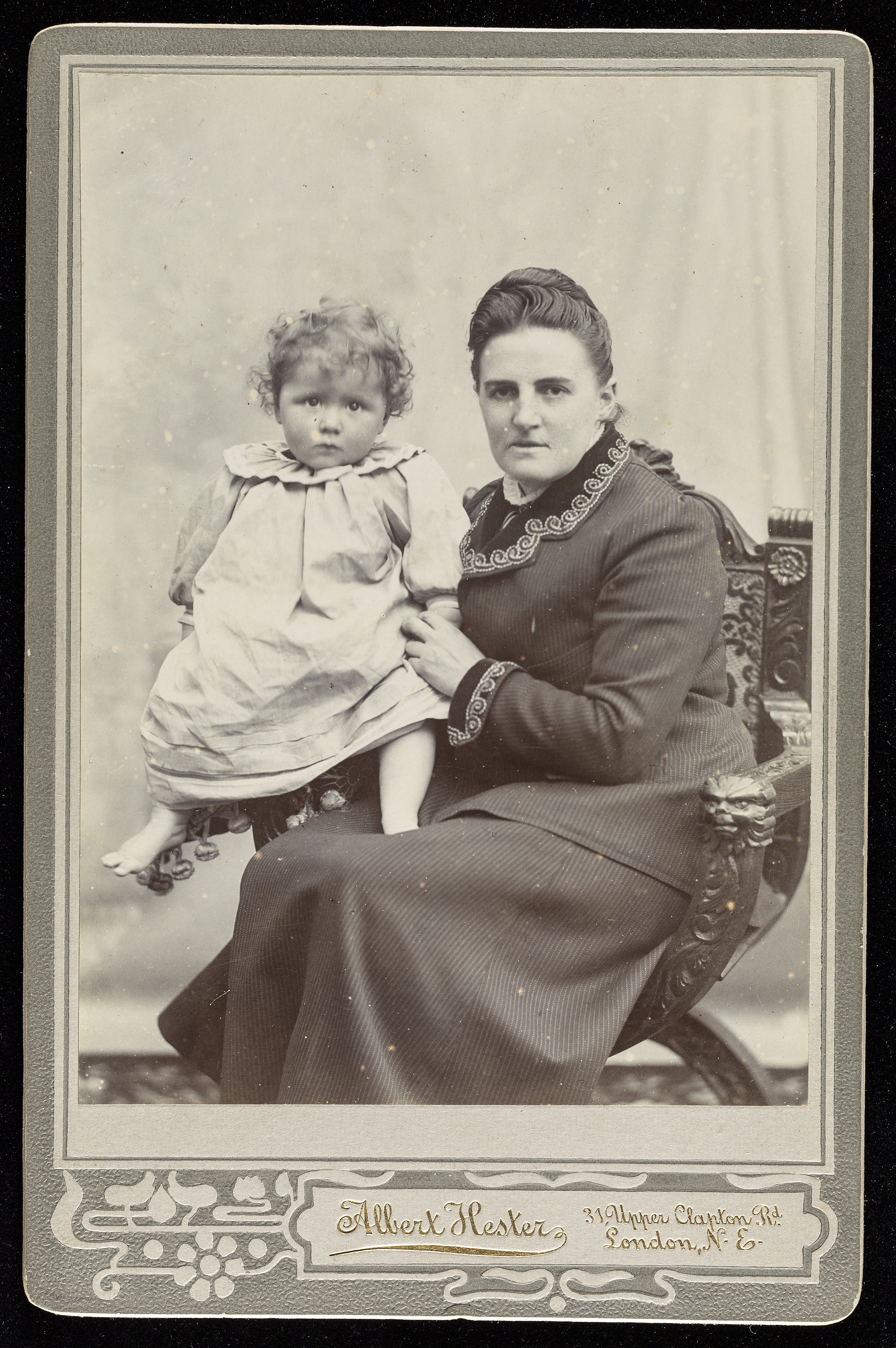
- Elizabeth Wilks and her adopted daughter Helen
- Born: Lizzie Bennett; 17 July 1861; Leicester, England
- Died: 16 November 1956 (aged 95); Headley Down, England
- Occupation: Medical doctor
- Organization: Women's Tax Resistance League
- Known for: Tax resistance
- Spouse: Mark Wilks

Elizabeth Wilks born Lizzie Bennett (17 July 1861 – 16 November 1956) was a British doctor, suffragist, tax resister and philanthropist. She was a founder member and treasurer of the Women's Tax Resistance League (WTFL). She was married to Mark Wilks who was sent to jail for her refusal to pay tax and his refusal to make his wife tell him how much she earned.

== Life ==
Wilks was born in De Montfort Square in Leicester to John and Sarah Annie Bennett. She attended the university of London and when she left in 1896 she was a qualified doctor and she had a degree in surgery. The same year she married Mark Wilks who was a London teacher.

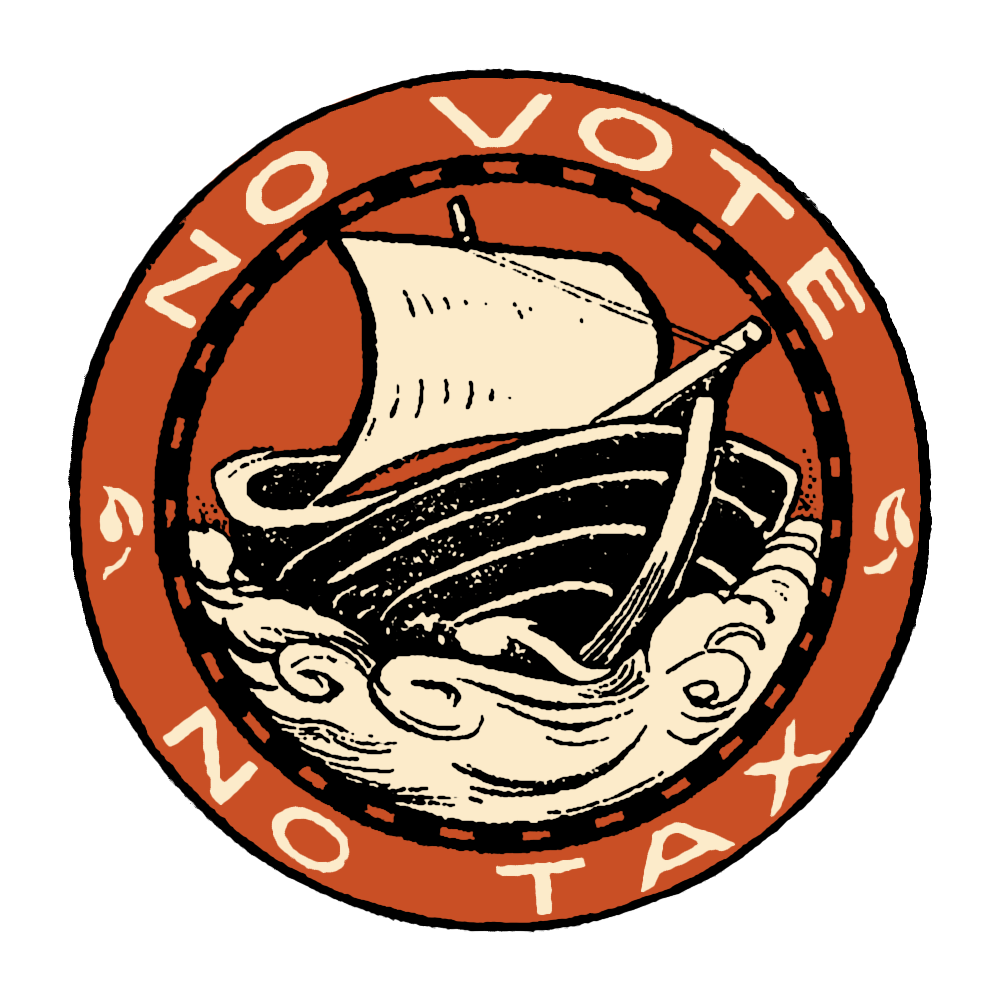
The Women's Tax Resistance League badge: "No Vote No Tax!"

== Women's Tax Resistance League ==
Wilks was a founder member of the Women's Tax Resistance League (WTFL) which was a group who objected particularly to women paying tax to a government over which they had no electoral control. Wilks became the treasurer of the organisation whose motto was "No Vote No Tax!".

== Tax resistance and the 1908 protest ==
Dr Wilks with her husband Mark, c.1890

Wilks came to notice when she refused to pay her tax in 1908. Married women were not required to pay taxes per se in Britain at that time. According to the law a married couple's joint income was added together and the husband paid the tax. However Elizabeth, who as a doctor, earned more than her husband, refused to tell her husband how much she earned. This put the authorities into a quandary as Elizabeth was not liable to pay tax and her husband was nominally willing to pay the tax but he said that he had no idea how much to pay. There was no legal requirement for Elizabeth to tell her husband about her income. In 1910 the authorities illegally seized some of her goods in an attempt to levy the tax on her income. The authorities then tried to claim the tax either from them as a couple or by her husband alone. This was legally unsatisfactory as Mark was being asked for tax on her income (of about £600 per annum) that he was nominally unaware of. 3,000 teachers signed a petition when Mark Wilks was placed in Brixton Jail, appeals were made to the King and there was a demonstration in Trafalgar Square to protest at his treatment. He was released after a fortnight to celebrations at Caxton Hall from the supporters of the Women's Tax Resistance League. His support included the writer George Bernard Shaw. Despite a debate in the House of Lords where it was realised that the law was unfair, British law did not get amended until 1972.

== Later years and local legacy ==
The Wilks moved to the village of Headley Down in Hampshire where Elizabeth was concerned by the quality of the public housing in 1933. She raised the money to build sixteen new residences which were managed by the newly formed Headley Public Utility Society.

Wilks died in Headley Down in 1956 and she left her home and ten acres of woodland to the Headley Public Utility Society. The residences were given to the local authority but the Headley PUS still maintains the woodlands for public benefit.
