= Women's Tax Resistance League =

U.K. women's suffragist activist group (1909–1918)

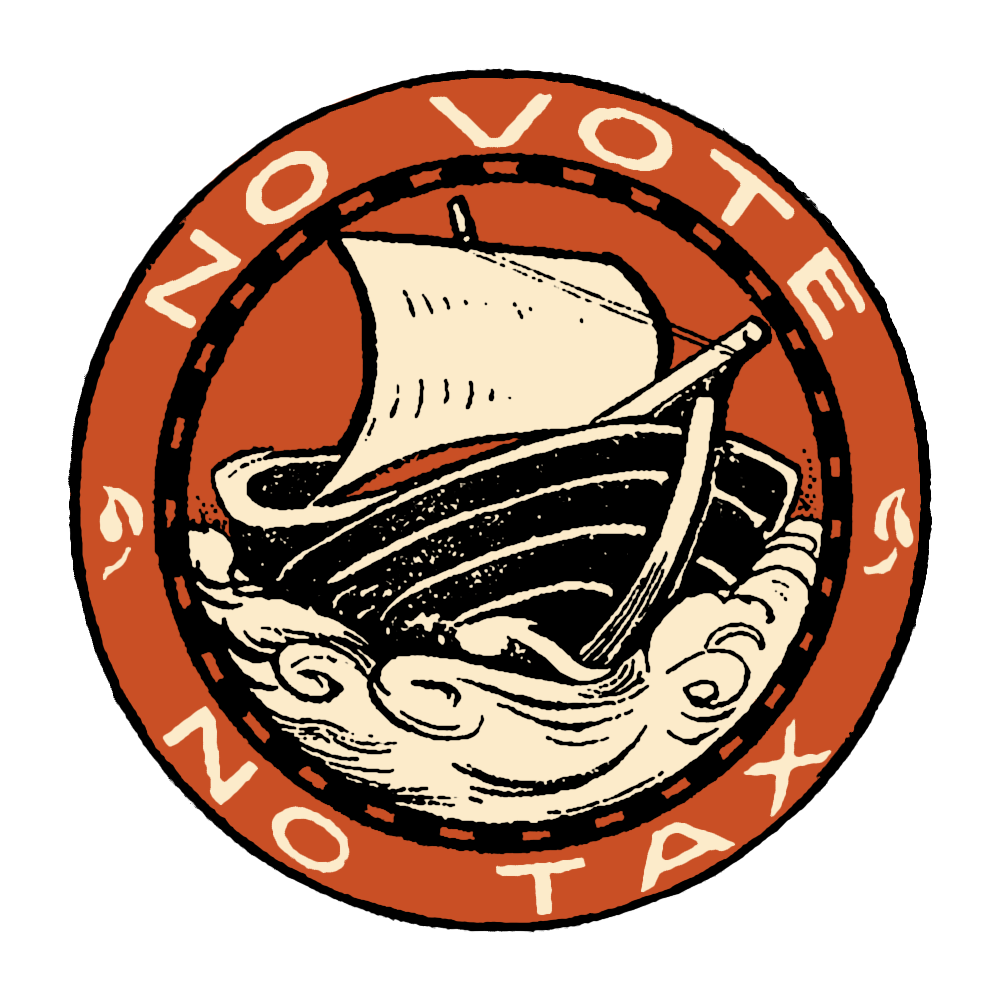
The WTRL badge designed by Mary Sargant Florence.

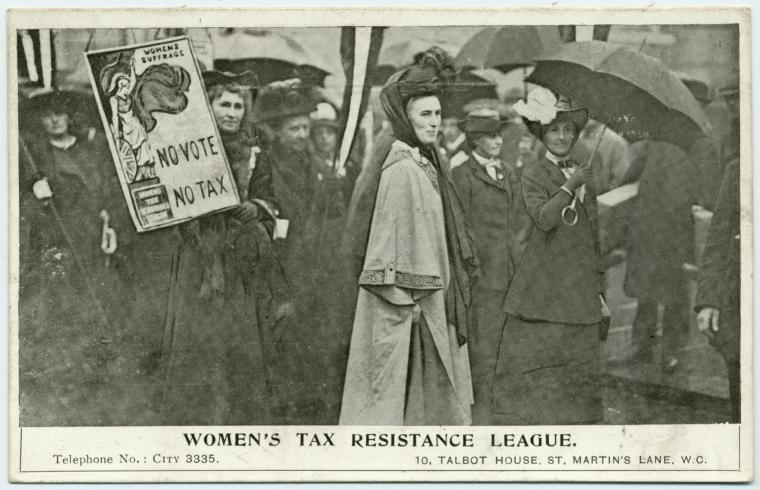
Clemence Housman photographed during a suffragist demonstration.

The Women's Tax Resistance League (WTRL) was from 1909 to 1918 a direct action group associated with the Women's Freedom League that used tax resistance to protest against the disenfranchisement of women during the British women's suffrage movement.

Dora Montefiore proposed the formation of the league in 1897, and it was formally established on 22 October 1909. The league's activities peaked in the years before the First World War but were largely deflated in 1914 by the onset of that war, when the league membership passed a resolution to temporarily suspend their tax resistance.

Members saw themselves in a tradition of British tax resistance that included John Hampden. According to one source: "Tax resistance proved to be the longest-lived form of militancy, and the most difficult to prosecute. More than 220 women, mostly middle-class, participated in tax resistance between 1906 and 1918, some continuing to resist through the First World War, despite a general suspension of militancy."

== Programme ==
League member and author Beatrice Harraden said in 1913:

The least any woman can do is to refuse to pay taxes, especially the tax on actually earned income. This is certainly the most logical phase of the fight for suffrage. It is a culmination of the Government's injustice and stupidity to ask that we pay an income tax on income earned by brains, when they are refusing to consider us eligible to vote.

The league was formed three years ago with the slogan: "No vote, no tax". It is non-partisan—an association of constitutional and militant suffragists, recruited from various suffrage societies for the purpose of resisting taxes.

== Action ==
In several cases, the government seized and sold at auction items owned by the resisters. The League used these occasions as opportunities for demonstrations and publicity, for instance the "Siege of Montefiore" in 1906:

The house, surrounded by a wall, could be reached only through an arched doorway, which Montefiore and her maid barred against the bailiffs. For six weeks, Montefiore resisted payment of her taxes, addressing the frequent crowds through the upper windows of the house.

Elizabeth Wilks, who was the treasurer of the league, refused to pay her tax in 1908. Married women were not required to pay tax in Britain at that time. According to the law, the joint income of a couple was added together and the husband paid the tax. However, Elizabeth, who earned more than her husband, refused to tell her husband, Mark Wilks, how much she earned. This put the authorities into a quandary, as Elizabeth was not liable to pay tax and her husband said he was willing to pay the tax but had no idea how much to pay. In 1910, the authorities illegally seized some of Elizabeth's goods in an attempt to levy the tax on her income. The authorities then tried to claim the tax as coming either from both Wilkses or from Mark Wilks alone. This was legally unsatisfactory, as Mark Wilks was being asked for tax on an income of about £600 per annum that he was nominally unaware of. Subsequently, 3,000 teachers signed a petition when Mark Wilks was placed in Brixton prison, and there was a demonstration in Trafalgar Square to protest his treatment. He was released after a fortnight to celebrations from the supporters of the Women's Tax Resistance League, who included George Bernard Shaw.

When tax resistance members had goods seized and auctioned to pay back taxes, processions from the auction house and celebrations took place with other supporters, with public speeches from decorated carriages, to explain their protest.

Despite a House of Lords debate in 1912 which declared the existing law unfair, albeit mainly in the sense that Wilks should not have been imprisoned for Elizabeth's refusal, the tax rules governing joint payment by married couples was not abolished until 1972.

== Membership ==
Among the members or those who had their goods auctioned to pay overdue taxes, were:

- Janie Allan
- Bertha Bacon
- Sarah Benett
- Anne Cobden-Sanderson
- Alice Davies
- Charlotte Despard
- Dr. Margaret Dobson
- Ethel Sargant
- Mary Sargant Florence
- Katharine Gatty
- Cicely Hamilton
- Dr. Mabel Hardie
- Beatrice Harraden
- Kate Harvey
- Kate Haslam
- Isabella Eliza Harrison
- Dr. Katherine Heaney
- Amy Hicks or Bull
- Lilian Hicks
- Clemence Housman
- Edith How-Martyn
- Emily Juson Kerr
- Anna Martin
- Agnes Metcalfe
- Dora Montefiore
- Anna Munro
- Dorinda Neligan
- Margaret Nevison
- Margaret Kineton Parkes
- Winifred Patch
- Louisa Thompson Price
- Ethel Ayres Purdie
- Caroline Frances Purves
- Mary Russell, Duchess of Bedford
- Princess Sophia Duleep Singh
- Flora Annie Steel
- Elizabeth Wilks
- Edith Zangwill
- and Stanton Coit (a member of "the men's branch").

Others included: Dr Garrett Anderson, the Misses Collier, the Misses Dawes Thompson, Mrs. Hartley, Mrs Merivale Mayer, Mrs. Milligan, Miss Raleigh, Mrs. Vaughan and Miss Green, Mrs. Bormann Wells.

== Women's Tax Resistance in the United States ==
The women's suffrage movement in the United States came to adopt some of the same techniques. Anna Howard Shaw said "I hold it is unfair to the women of this country to have taxation without representation, and I have urged [members of the National Woman Suffrage Association] to adopt a course of passive resistance like the Quakers instead of aggressive resistance. I say to the Government, 'you may pick my pocket because you are stronger than I, but I'm not going to turn my pockets wrongside out for you.' ... I believe that the spirit of 'no taxation without representation' that resulted in the Revolutionary War is inherent and just as actual in the women of the country as it was then in the men of the country."

== Archives ==
The archives of the Women's Tax Resistance League are held at The Women's Library at London Metropolitan University, ref 2WTR
