= Lena Connell =

British photographer (1875–1949)

- Born: Adelin Beatrice Connell; 27 July 1875; London, England
- Died: 4 March 1949 (aged 73); London, England
- Other name: Beatrice Cundy
- Occupation: portrait photographer
- Spouse: Jack Arthur Cundy (m. 1914)

Adelin Beatrice "Lena" Connell, also known professionally as Beatrice Cundy, (27 July 1875 – 4 March 1949) was a British suffragette and a well-known photographer whose work is held in the National Portrait Gallery, London.

== Life ==
Connell was born in London in 1875 to Frederic and Catherine Connell. Her father (and his father) had made high-class watches known as chronometers, but her father's interest moved to photography before he became a salesperson. The photography business made his daughters Dora and Alina into photographer's assistants and Adelina/Lena's career path was decided.

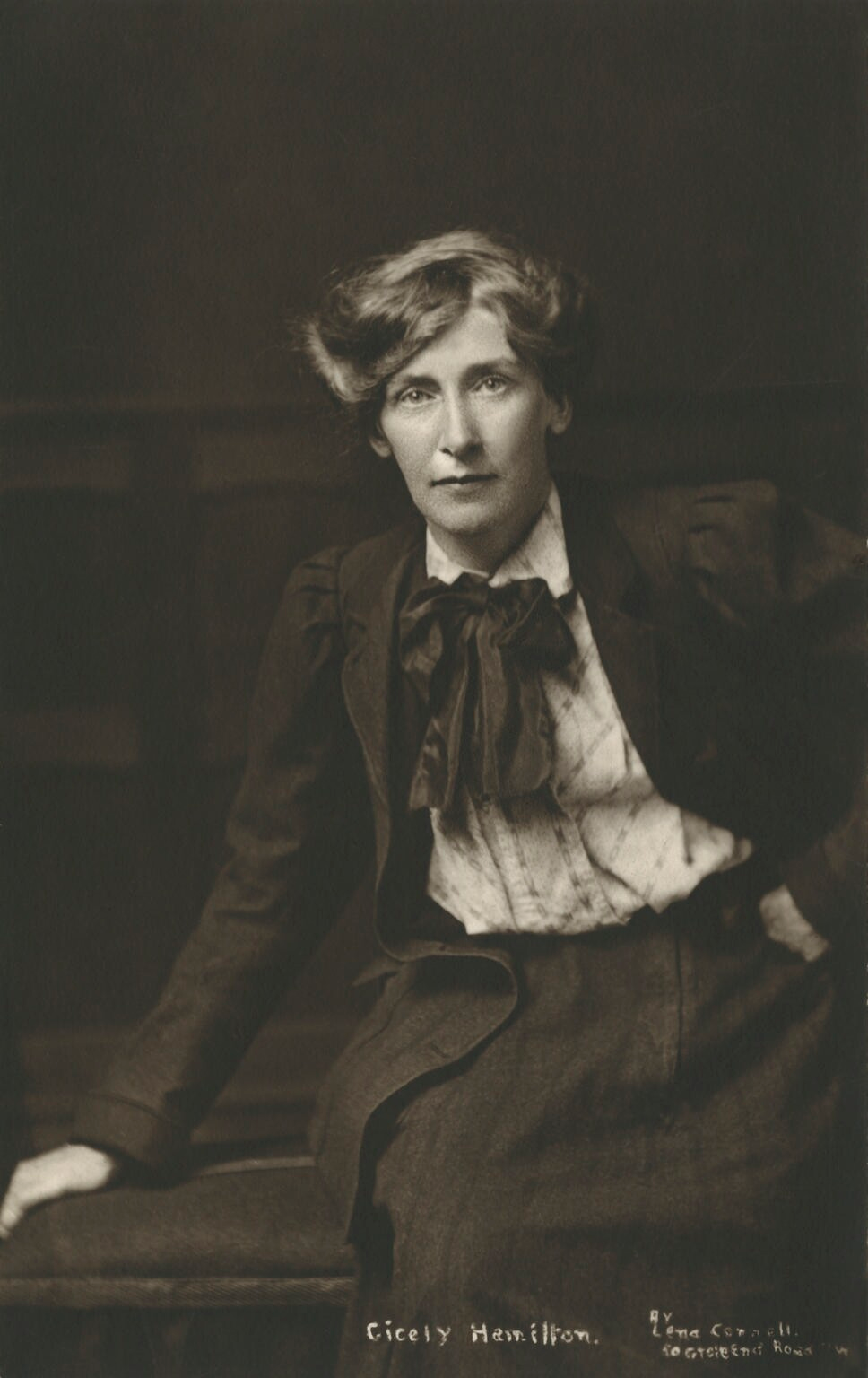
Cicely Hamilton was a leading campaigner and they worked together. Photo by Connell from the 1910s

Connell started her own photography business and was exhibiting her work professionally at the New Gallery Exhibition in 1901. She employed female staff. She was elected a member of the Professional Photographers' Association in 1903. She was said to be the first woman photographer to take pictures of male subjects.

Connell took pictures of leading members of the Women's Freedom League as well as Emmeline Pankhurst and other suffrage leaders. She was intrigued by the suffrage cause after she was employed to take pictures of the suffragette Gladice Keevil after she was released from prison. Photographs of leading suffragettes were made into postcards and copies were sold to supporters as a method of raising funds. Connell was a member of the WSPU in Hampstead and she collaborated with Cicely Hamilton on Edith Craig's production of her iconic play "A Pageant of Women" by the Pioneer Players. Connell's resulting portraits of the leading producers and players, Ellen Terry, Christopher St John, Hamilton and Craig, were exhibited at the Royal Photographic Society in 1910/1911.

In 1911 Connell was advertising for an assistant in "The Suffragette" magazine to work at her studio in St John's Wood. Connell married Jack Cundy in 1914 and, in 1922, closed her shop and decided to specialise in "at-home" photography using her married name of Beatrice Cundy. She continued to exhibit her work and an exhibition of her 'at home' portraiture was held at the Halcyon Club in June 1929 and October 1932.

== Death and legacy ==
Connell died in 1949. Copies of her photographs are held in the National Portrait Gallery in London.
