= WSPU Holloway Prisoners Banner =

Suffragette banner designed by Scottish artist Ann Macbeth

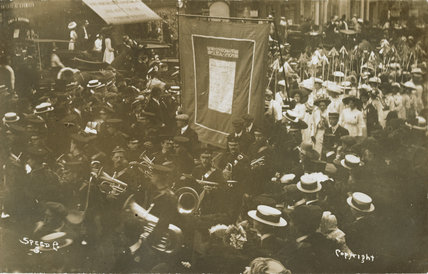
The WSPU signatures' banner in 1910

The WSPU Holloway Banner is a suffragette banner designed by Scottish artist Ann Macbeth.

== Origin ==
The banner consists of 80 pieces of linen, each embroidered with the signatures of those women who had participated in hunger strikes in support of the cause of women's suffrage. The pieces are bordered by green and purple. Along the top is embroidered "Women's Social and Political Union" in the Art Nouveau style. Also at the top are the names of some leaders of the women's suffrage movement, Annie Kenney, Christabel Pankhurst and Emmeline Pankhurst.

The banner was originally designed as a friendship quilt, and converted into a banner with the addition of carrying poles. It was donated by Macbeth to a bazaar held by the W.S.P.U. at Charing Cross Halls in Glasgow on 28 April 1910. It was bought for £10 by Emmeline Pethick-Lawrence, Baroness Pethick-Lawrence.

The banner was carried in the 'From Prison to Citizenship' procession held in June 1910.

== Women named on banner ==
The names of Christabel Pankhurst, Emmeline Pankhurst, Emmeline Pethick-Lawrence and Annie Kenney appear at the tip of the banner around the letters of WSPU.

Names as they appear on the banner
Lucy Burns	Constance Craig or Bray (Note: Possibly Constance Bryer or Constance Lytton)	Jane Warton (Note: Jane Warton was Lady Constance Lytton's pseudonym)	Jane Esdon Malloch Brailsford
Mabel Kirby	Dora Marsden	Georgina Healiss	Leslie Hall (Note: Leslie Hall was Letitia Withall's pseudonym)
Ellen Pitfield	Florence Clarkson	Mabel Capper	Hannah Shepherd
Agnes Corson	Margaret West	Dorothy Pethick	Edith Hudson
Kitty Marion	Helen Tolson	Helen Gordon Liddel	Alice Hawkins
Mary Leigh	Sarah Carwin	Elsie Roe-Brown	Bertha Brewster
Jessie Lawes	[illegible]	Selina Martin	Lillian Dove-Willcox
Violet Mary Jones	Grace Cameron-Swan	Adela Pankhurst	Kathleen Brown
Fanny Halliwell	Winifred Jones	Theresa Garnett	Nellie Godfrey
Helen Archdale	EE Hesmondhalgh	Vera Wentworth	Nora Dunlop
Ellen Barnwell	Eugenie Bouvier	Charlotte Marsh	Lillian Norbury
Lilgard Atheling	Elsie Howey	Mary Phillips	G Holtwhite Simmons
Ethel Slade	Catherine Worthington	Helen Kirkpatrick Watts	Maud Joachim
Ada Wright	Violet O'Brien	Rona Robinson	Florence Spong
Kathleen Jarvis	Nellie Crocker	Dorothy Shallard	Edith Davies
Elsie Mackenzie	Edith New	Alice Paul	Emily Wilding Davison
Isabel Kelley	Caro Bray Jolly	Florence Cook	Catherine Tolson
Marion Wallace Dunlop	Rosamund Massy	Laura Ainsworth	Violet Bryant
Gladys Roberts	Edith Rigby	Jenny Baines (Note: Jenny Baines was Sarah Jane Baines' pseudonym)	Helen Burkitt
Mary Allen	Ellen Pitman	Annie Bell	Grace Chappelow

== See also ==
Image of banner at Museum of London: https://www.londonmuseum.org.uk/collections/v/object-91239/wspu-holloway-prisoners/
