= Annie Barnes (suffragist) =

British-Italian socialist and suffragist (1886–1982)

- Born: Annie Cappuccio; 6 October 1886; Limehouse, London, England
- Died: 22 February 1982 (aged 95); East Ham, England
- Organization(s): East London Federation of Suffragettes; Charity Organization Society
- Known for: Suffragist activism

Annie Barnes (née Cappuccio; 6 December 1886 – 22 February 1982) was a British-Italian socialist and suffragist.

== Life and suffragist action ==
Barnes was born in Limehouse, Tower Hamlets, London, on 6 October 1886. She was born Annie Cappuccio and her father had a confectionery, fruit and vegetable shop. In her autobiography Tough Annie she did not mention her Italian roots, but recalled her mother helping their particularly poor neighbours, employing widows or others to help in the house: "Mother always believed in treating everyone the same, as equals..That's how I was brought up."

Barnes saw the crowd of suffragette protestors in July 1909, outside Edinburgh Castle Hall in Limehouse, including Mary Leigh, Mabel Capper, and Jennie Baines trying to enter the David Lloyd George event. She said it was a "real to-do" including police falling head first off a horse into water trough to the crowd's amusement and then a woman in a wheelchair, possibly Rosa May Billinghurst, (who had been touching the horse) taken by van off to the police station. Barnes and her mother also witnessed four suffragette speakers talking against worker exploitation, then being given verbal abuse by men in the listening crowd, telling them to 'wash their dirty kids. You women are inferior to men anyway". And Barnes admired the speaker's retort "how can an inferior give birth to a superior" and was drawn to join the movement. Sylvia Pankhurst persuaded her to join the East London Federation of Suffragettes in 1913.

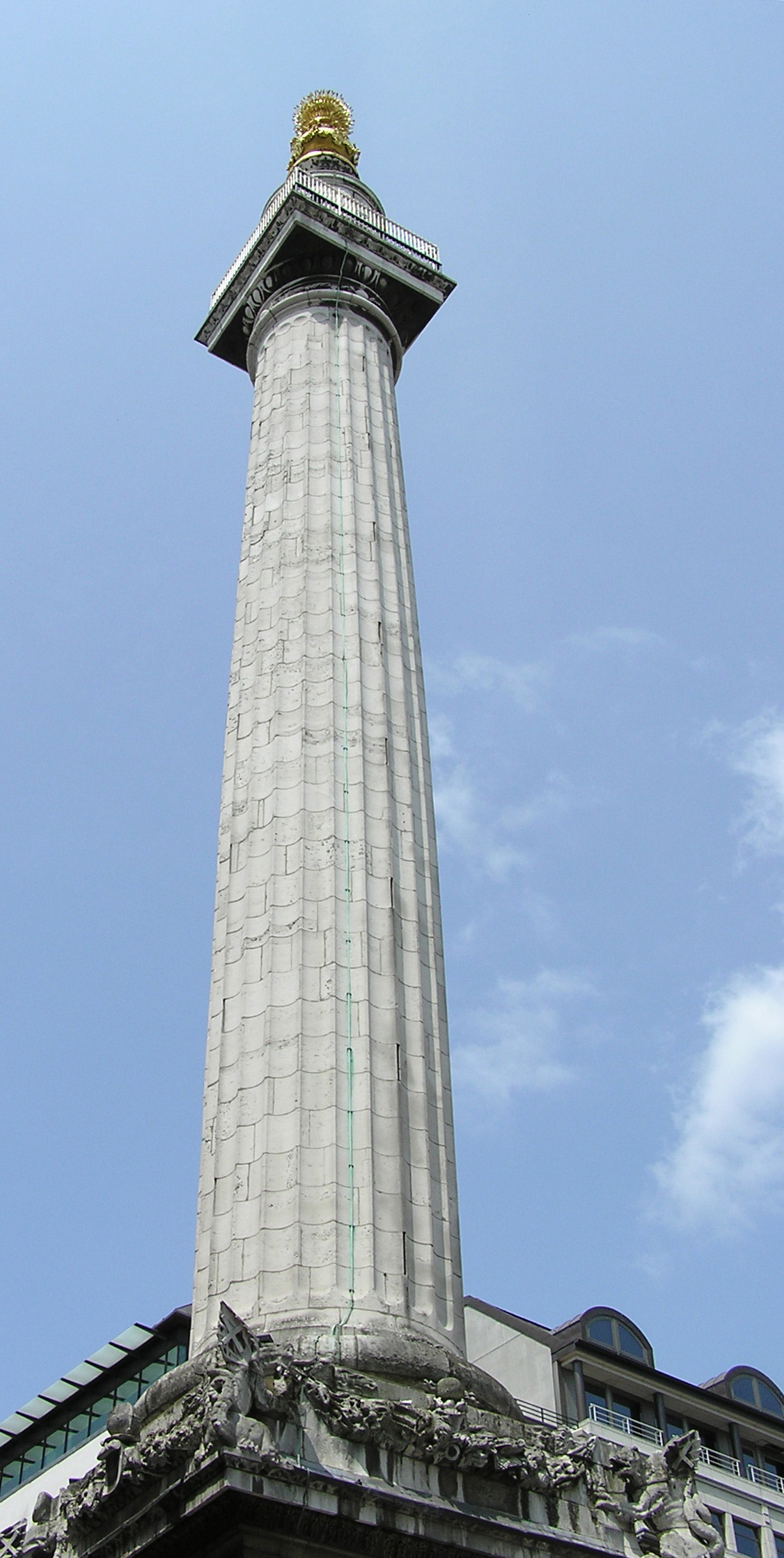
The Monument, London, where Annie Barnes and others protested

On 8 April 1913, she went with Gertrude Shaw and Ethel Spark to the top of The Monument (to the Great Fire of London in Pudding Lane) throwing 'Votes for Women' leaflets down. The Times and Daily Mirror the next day printed pictures of a large crowd who gathered to watch, including men from Billingsgate fish market nearby. Barnes convinced the waiting police that she could not have climbed the 311 steps inside and had just gone up a little then returned. Shaw and Spark meantime hung a purple, white and green flag and a black banner "Death or Victory" from the top and were arrested and later released.

Barnes was an enthusiastic supporter of women's suffrage but she avoided getting involved in any protest that might lead to a custodial sentence. Barnes enjoyed the many suffrage meetings and she found it difficult to refuse Pankhurst's leadership. She did refuse to be smuggled into the Houses of Parliament to drop flour on the prime ministers head, but she later dropped leaflets from London Bridge. She was stopped by the police but again managed to talk her way out of an arrest.

She married Albert Barnes in 1919. They had no children of their own, but cared for Annie's younger siblings after her father remarried.

She was later shocked by Pankhurst's disregard for matrimony. Pankhurst was a communist, but Barnes joined a Socialist group.

== Later life ==
Barnes was a Labour member of Stepney Metropolitan Borough Council from 1934 to 1937, and again from 1941 to 1949. In 1938 she joined the Charity Organization Society which was active in assisting the poor but it had a poor reputation. Under her advice the organisation changed its name to remove the word "charity" to assist those who received their philanthropy.

She and her husband were bombed out during the Second World War and lived for a time at Toynbee Hall.

She continued to keep in contact with Sylvia Pankhurst until she emigrated to Ethiopia in 1955.

Brian Harrison recorded 2 oral history interviews with Barnes, in November and December 1974, as part of the Suffrage Interviews project, titled Oral evidence on the suffragette and suffragist movements: the Brian Harrison interviews. Barnes talks extensively about Sylvia Pankhurst as well as her work for the Labour Party.

== Death and legacy ==
Barnes died on 22 February 1982 in East Ham, London, England. The accounts of Barnes's life were in part inspiration for the 2015 film Suffragette.
