= William Ball (suffragist) =

British workers union member

- Born: 4 November 1862; Coton, Staffordshire, England
- Died: 1935 (aged 72–73)
- Organization: National Transport Workers Federation
- Known for: Suffragist, imprisoned, force-fed, moved to lunatic asylum
- Spouse: Miriam Jennie Warick

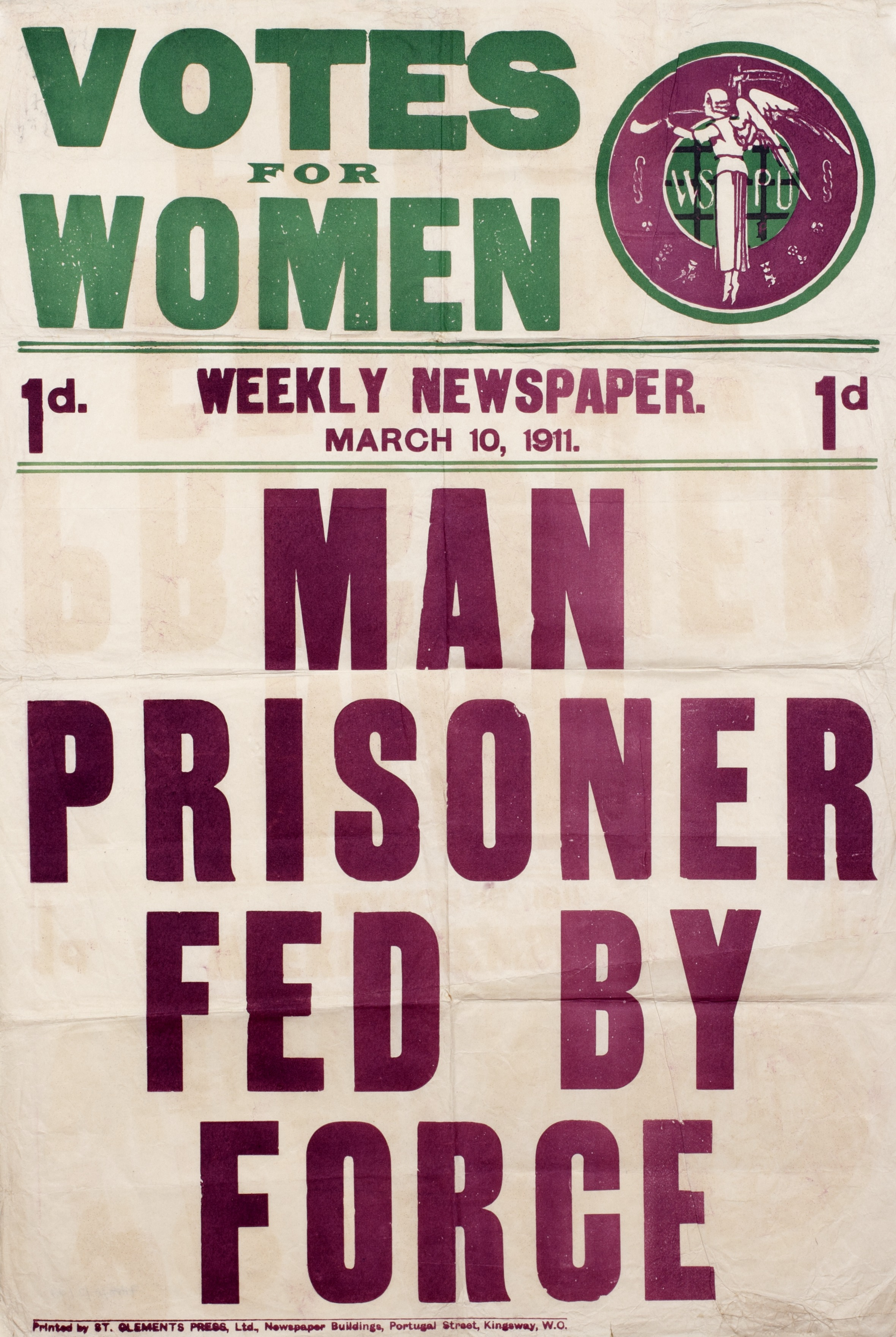
poster by WSPU about men being force fed

William Ball (4 November 1862 – 1935) was a British workers union member, jailed for his support of women's suffrage, and subject of a WSPU pamphlet, "Torture In An English Prison", which described his experience being force-fed such that his health deteriorated and he was sent to a lunatic asylum.

== Life ==
William Ball was born in Coton, Staffordshire to Thomas Ball, a gardener, and Elizabeth Ball. In Birmingham in 1891, he married Miriam Jennie Warick, with whom he had five children. Ball was a member of the National Transport Workers Federation.

He was an athlete and a "championship sprinter" of the Midlands. According to the WSPU pamphlet Torture In An English Prison, neither he nor his family had any history of mental illness.

== Imprisonment and consequences ==
Ball's arrest and imprisonment in December 1911 was for breaking two panes of the Home Office windows in protest at the jailing of another man, Alan MacDougall, who had supported the suffragettes attending political meetings. Ball also was against the Manhood Suffrage Bill which "would bar the passage of a measure for votes for women".

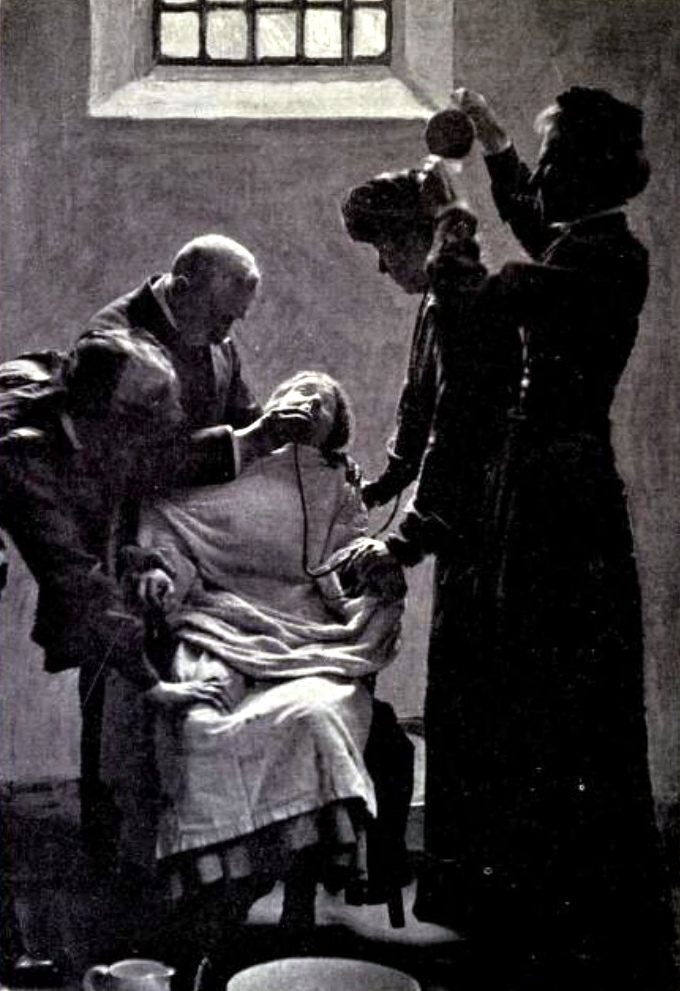
Force feeding similar to that used on William Ball

A first offence, but with a sentence of two months at Pentonville prison, Ball was denied the right to wear his own clothes, like the women suffragettes at the same time. He refused prison clothing and went on hunger strike, was force-fed for the first time on Christmas Day and then twice daily for 37 days.

This "disgusting" process meant being held down by two warders, "a tube thrust up his nose and down his throat".

Ball was forbidden from writing to his wife, Jennie, and denied visits, despite her frequent letters of appeal to the prison governor, Major Owen Davies. With four dependent children and only one wage, Jennie wrote to the Prison Commission, Home Office with a request to insure Ball's life, which would require a doctor's visit to assess his health. This too was denied with a statement from the prison that he was in his "usual health" and due for discharge on 21 February; but on 12 February, she was then informed that he was certified insane and transferred to a pauper's asylum.

Solicitor Arthur Marshall, husband of WSPU's Kitty Marshall took Jennie to the Home Office to find out Ball was at Colney Hatch, Barnet. On visiting, Ball's wife found him "very seriously ill and in an exceedingly emaciated condition with nose and throat swollen and inflamed from forcible feeding."

He could not talk, but in whispers said he had been in a locked punishment cell on two occasions. Arthur Marshall represented Ball's wife to the Lunacy Commission and got permission to move Ball to a private nursing home, paid for by his suffragette sympathisers.

== "Torture In An English Prison" ==
The WSPU made the point that he was secretly moved to the lunatic asylum. It also included Mary Leigh's description of force feeding:

...the drums of the ears seem to be bursting, and there is a horrible pain in the throat and breast...

The WSPU handbill 'Torture in an English Prison' and the leaflet 'The Case of William Ball' can be seen at the Museum of London.

The Men's League for Women's Suffrage was told about the case at a March 1912 meeting in the Queen's Hall, Langham Place, London. This was on the same day that the shop windows in Regent Street, Oxford Street and Picadilly area were being broken by small groups of suffragettes, resulting in charges of "conspiracy" against the women leaders of WSPU. The leaflet theme Brutality on the Increase and outrage at the treatment of Ball was supported by influential male speakers: George Lansbury, M.P. for Bow and Bromley (Labour), Charles Mansell-Moullin and Victor Duval (brother of Elsie Duval), a founder of the Men's Political Union group.

At her eighth trial, for suffragette activism, at Bow Street Court, for breaking Post Office windows, Ellen (Nellie//Nelliy) Crocker, cousin of Emmeline Pethick-Lawrence, denounced the hard sentences given to Ball and MacDougall as part of the justification for her own actions. In February 1912, Mary Gawthorpe broke a window at the Home Office in protest at William Ball's imprisonment.

Ball gets a specific mention in the National Archive records of the 1,000 women's suffrage supporters arrested and imprisoned during 1906–1914.
