= Cecil Chisholm =

British journalist, publisher and author

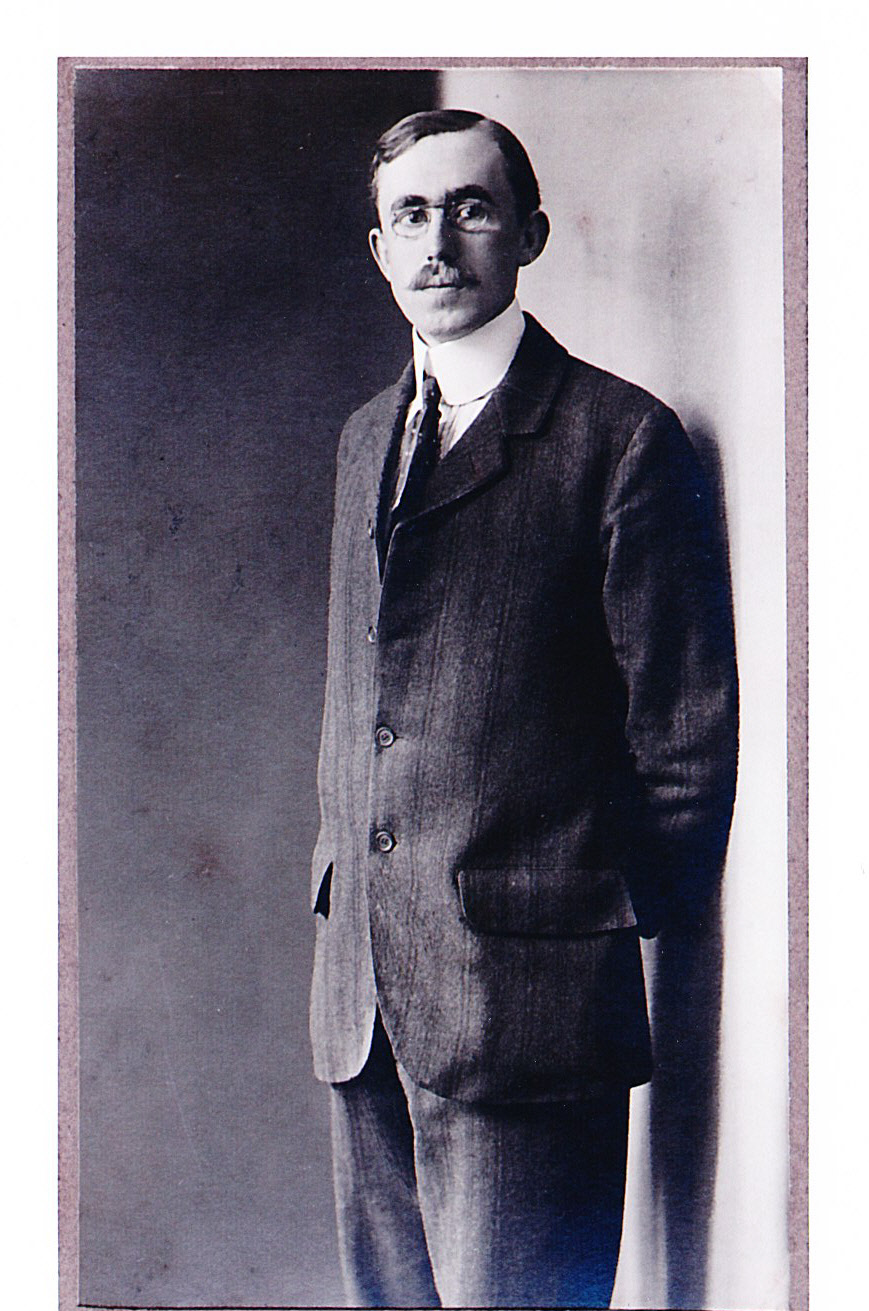
Thomas Cecil Chisholm 1910

Thomas Cecil Chisholm (1888 – 24 November 1961) was a British journalist, publisher and author noted for his 1914 biography of Sir John French, and books on Repertory theatre, Economics, and Business. His books on Retirement, published by Penguin Books sold well in the late 1950s.

== Family ==
He was the only child of John Christie Chisholm, a solicitor and Provost of Dalkeith and Jean Anderson, the first woman Provost of Dalkeith.

== Education ==
Chisholm was educated at George Watson's College, Edinburgh, afterwards Edinburgh University and finally Göttingen University

== Career ==
He initially worked for ten years as a journalist for newspapers in Bournemouth, Manchester and London and wrote his first book just before World War I. For the next twenty years he was chairman and editorial director of the specialist Publishing House; Business Publications Ltd and wrote a series of books on Business Management. Finally Chisholm wrote on the Management of Repertory Theatre and two popular practical guides to Retirement, together with further books on Marketing and Advertising. He continued to work and travelled extensively researching material for his books until his death.

== Marriage ==
In 1921, at Hampstead, London. he married Mabel Capper, a former Suffragette and militant campaigner for women's rights. There were no children from the marriage.

== Death ==
Chisholm died at home; Windrush Cottage, Fairlight, East Sussex on 24 November 1961.

== Books ==
- Sir John French An Authentic Biography. New York: Frederick A Stokes Company. 1914. ISBN 978-0-665-71944-8.
- The Business Girl's Handbook. London, New York: Sir I. Pitman & Sons. 1916. OCLC 49447232.
- The Boy's Book of Business. London: Unknown. 1916. OCLC 222011531.
- Marketing and Merchandising (Modern Business Vol 3). London: Business Publications Ltd. 1924. OCLC 54047758.
- Vulcan, or The Future of Labour. London, New York: London, K. Paul, Trench, Trubner & Co.: New York, E.P. Dutton & Co. 1925. OCLC 1898024.
- Simplified Practice, an outline of the new Industrial Policy. London: Chapman and Hall Ltd. 1927. OCLC 39246716.
- Modern Marketing and Sales Promotion. London: Gramol Publications. 1930. OCLC 559890245.
- Repertory, an outline of the modern Theatre Movement. London: Peter Davis Ltd. 1934. OCLC 498917407.
- The Economic Function of Advertising. London: Business Publications Ltd. 1943. OCLC 558768136.
- Marketing Survey of the United Kingdom (5 Editions in all). London: Business Publications Ltd. 1948. OCLC 254976290.
- Retire and Enjoy it; the £sd of Retirement. London: A Penguin Handbook, Penguin Books Ltd. 1954. OCLC 2096064.
- Communication in Industry, (Editor). London: Business Publications Ltd. 1955. OCLC 610861345.
- Retire into the Sun; a survey of some possibilities in nine Paradises. London: Phoenix House. 1961. OCLC 2099230.
