= Bertha Quinn =

British suffragette and socialist (1873–1951)

- Born: 1873; Middlesbrough, England
- Died: 1951 (aged 77–78); Leeds, England
- Occupations: Catholic, suffragette and socialist
- Organization(s): Tailors and Garment Workers Union
- Known for: Suffragette activism including hunger strike
- Political party: Labour councillor 1929 -1943
- Movement: Women's Social and Political Union
- Awards: Papal award 1946: Bene Merenti Medal

Bertha Quinn (1873–1951) was a British suffragette and socialist, from Leeds, who was arrested five times and once went to prison, becoming one of the first Catholic suffragette prisoners to be force-fed after going on hunger strike. Quinn became a Labour councillor from 1929 to 1943, and was a trades union representative of the Tailors and Garment Workers from 1915 to 1943. Quinn was awarded the Papal Bene Merenti Medal in 1946.

== Early life ==
Baptised Bridget, but always known as Bertha, Quinn was born in Middlesbrough in 1873, to Irish Catholic parents. Quinn became a worker in the garment industry and later joined the workers union.

== Suffragette activism ==
Quinn became involved in the Women's Social and Political Union (WPSU militant suffragettes) in common with other working women who did not join the National Union of Women's Suffrage Societies (NUWSS) which was more aligned to the Liberal party and employers. Quinn took part in WSPU protests including chaining herself to the House of Commons railings and was arrested five times, and imprisoned after protesting when Prime Minister Asquith came to Leeds, brutally prevented from entering the venue by police, and resulting in five days in Armley Prison, Leeds in October 1908.

On 27 April 1909, Quinn and four other WSPU members accompanied a male companion into St. Stephen's Hall, at the House of Commons, allegedly waiting for their companion to meet his M.P. At the planned time of 4pm, when Big Ben chimed, Quinn blew a whistle, went to the statue of Lord Somers, and attached a banner advertising a WSPU Albert Hall rally, whilst Theresa Garnett, Margery Humes and Sylvia Russell attached themselves to other statues, and another (possibly Alys Pearsall Smith Russell) whistled and started a speech in nearby Central Hall. The reason given for this protest to the crowd who gathered was that statues were of men remembered for campaigning for 'British liberties' in Stuart days and that they (the suffragettes/suffragists) were doing the same for twentieth century Britons. This unusual protest was given press publicity, in Britain, and as far afield as New Zealand.

One hundred years afterwards, 78 M.Ps signed an early day motion to commemorate Quinn and the other women's action in favour of women's rights, and to continue encouraging all women to use their vote, and for Parliament to move towards gender balance.

== Political life ==
Quinn was among a large proportion of Catholics (a minority in the country at that time), in the Tailors and Garment Workers Union. That influenced her stance on a number of topical matters. At the Labour Women's Congress in May 1925, Quinn declared birth control as a 'crime against God', and information supporting it was 'filth', only to be reprimanded by 'Red Ellen' Wilkinson for being insulting, urging Quinn not to assume impure motives from delegates who 'hold equally sincere but opposing views. The motion was passed there, but sentiment went to and fro on the matter, for a number of years, across different Labour party conventions and votes, as the party was split. During the General Strike of 1926, Quinn was a leading member of the Leeds Council of Action, and later elected as a Labour councillor from 1929 to 1943, although at one point she was expelled from the party. At the age of 73, she still attended as councillor, the Leeds Council meetings and was described as 'fiery'.

In a Leeds Library lecture series, former politician Michael Meadowcroft described Quinn's personality as 'formidable but difficult' with 'great passion but little diplomacy'.

== Internationalism and faith ==
In 1917, Quinn was one of the two delegates sent to the Leeds Convention of the Independent Labour Party and the British Socialist Party, with 1,150 people joining leading politicians of the day including Keir Hardie, Asquith, Lloyd George, Ramsay MacDonald, Bernard Russell, Ernest Bevin which was controversially inciting action in solidarity with Russian workers and soldiers after the Russian revolution. The event had been resisted by the city dignitaries, but gone ahead due to pressure of numbers. It carried motions on world peace, a charter of human rights, and congratulated Russian workers revolutionaries, and even encouraging organised activism in the British working class.

At the 1936 Trades Union Congress, Quinn for the Tailors and Garment Workers Union, was one of the Catholic workers' leaders however who opposed the Spanish Civil War, and decried outrages on both sides of that conflict saying 'Red outrages had been perpetrated in Spain.' Quinn objected at her own union's congress that British workers groups were being asked to formally express solidarity with the Spanish trades unions, a point taken up by the Catholic press.' Quinn had also prevented clothing being collected and shipped out to the revolutionary side. And her final word was 'I have made my point and that is all I wanted.'

== Death ==
Quinn died in Leeds, in 1951, and her Requiem Mass at Leeds Cathedral was well attended. Quinn is buried at Killingbeek Cemetery.

The Lord Mayor, Alderman H. O'Donnell wrote in the Yorkshire Post,

"[Quinn] would neither be frightened out of her convictions, nor laughed out of them. She would stand in all weathers outside the cathedral and sell tickets for good causes. " In spite of her caustic tongue, she was a loyal friend to anyone in trouble, very womanly. good living, straightforward, thinking of everyone before herself. Her life was an example to the younger generation."
