= Sarah Jane Baines =

British-Australian social reformer (1866–1951)

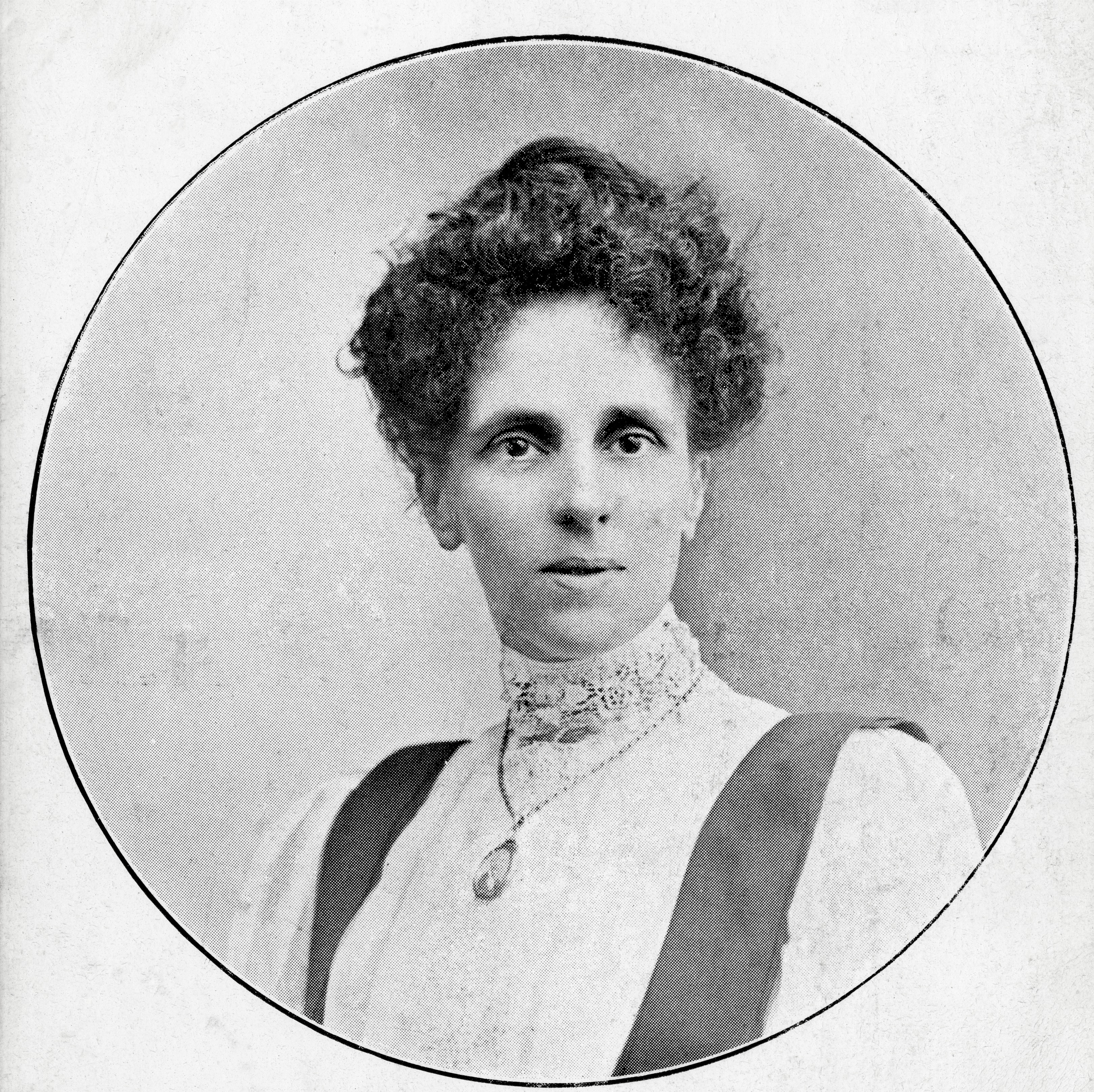
- Postcard portrait of Jennie Baines, 1907–1912
- Born: 30 November 1866; Birmingham, England
- Died: 20 February 1951 (aged 84); Port Melbourne, Melbourne, Victoria, Australia
- Other name: Jennie Baines
- Known for: Suffragette and social reformer
- Political party: Independent Labour Party

Sarah Jane Baines (30 November 1866 – 20 February 1951) was a British-Australian feminist, suffragette and social reformer. She was the first suffragette to be tried by jury and one of the first hunger strikers. She was known as 'Jennie Baines' in the suffrage movement. As A WSPU organiser, she organised rallies, disrupted meetings and set up new branches across the North of England and the Midlands. She also took part in an arson attempt in Dublin and was arrested there in 1912. She was arrested at least 15 times for her activism and is likely to have received a hunger strike medal. Due to her poor health, it was felt that she wouldn't survive another prison stint, so after her arrest in May 1913 Baines and her family were smuggled on to a ship bound for Australia. She continued campaigning there, as a socialist, peace activist and social reformer. In 1919. she was the first prisoner in Australia to go on hunger strike.

== Early life ==
Sarah Jane Baines was born in Birmingham, England, in 1866 to Sarah Ann (née Hunt) and James Edward Hunt, a gun maker. She began work at Joseph Chamberlain's ordnance factory at the age of eleven. At 14, Baines joined her parents in working with the Salvation Army. Upon attaining the rank of lieutenant at age twenty, she was sent to work as an evangelist in an independent working men's mission in Bolton. In this role, she was also called upon to act as a police court missionary caring for women who had been arrested.

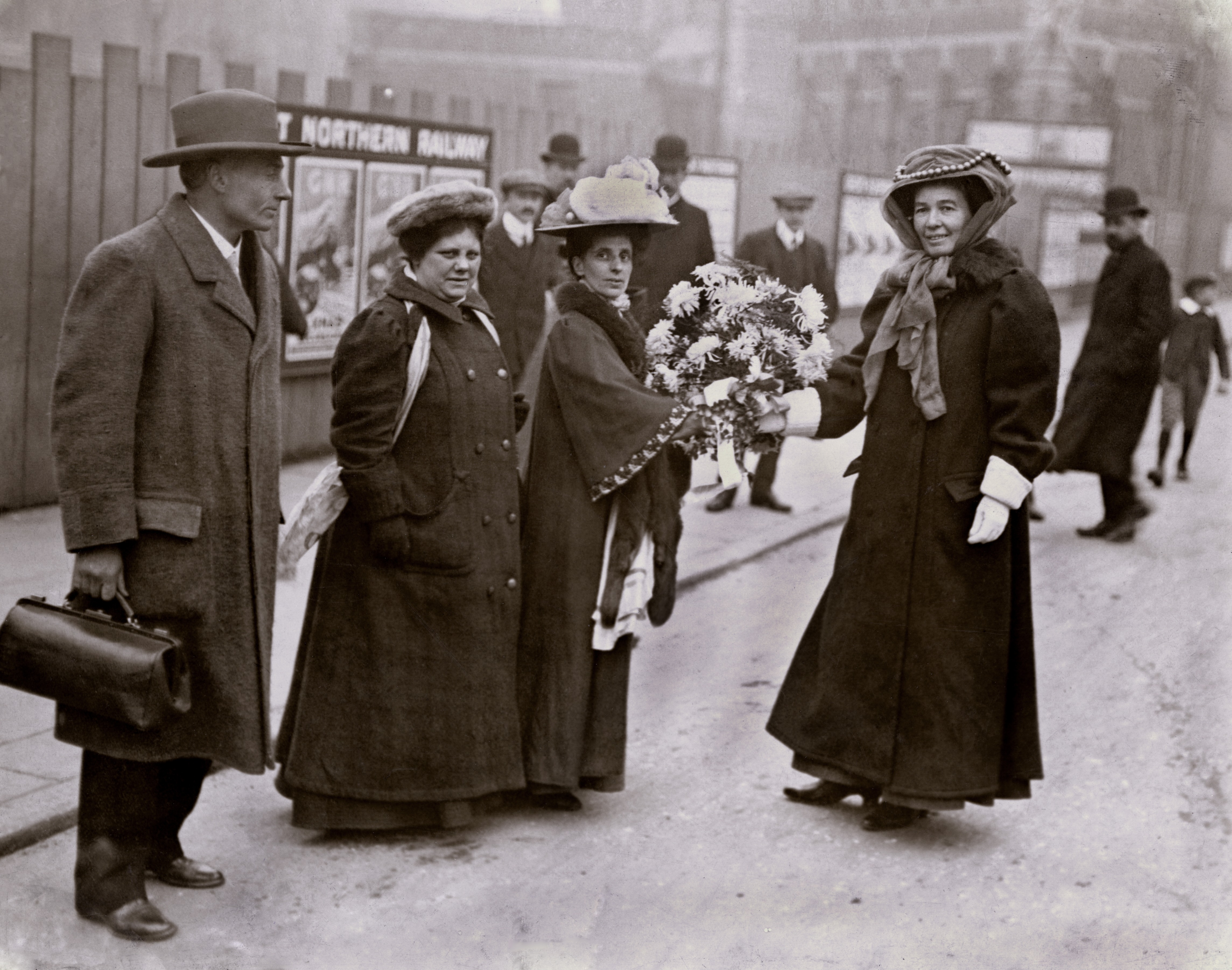
Emmeline Pethick Lawrence receiving a bouquet of flowers from Jennie Baines, Flora Drummond and Frederick Pethick Lawrence watching.

On 26 September 1888 in Bolton she married George Baines, a boot and shoemaker, and the couple had five children between 1888 and 1899 three of whom survived childhood. Between motherhood and her work as a sewing machinist, there was little time for public activities. Yet Baines' commitment never wavered, her youngest surviving child was six years old when she was imprisoned for the third time. Annie Kenney called her 'one of the most kind-hearted woman one could meet, a born revolutionary'. Baines also joined the Independent Labour Party, the feeding of school children committee and the unemployed committee.

== Campaigning for women's suffrage ==
In October 1905, Baines read about the arrest of suffragists Annie Kenney and Christabel Pankhurst for assault and this motivated her to join the Women's Social and Political Union. Initially this was as a voluntary basis but in February 1908, Baines was made a paid organiser on a wage of £2 a week, organising open-air rallies, disrupting meetings and establishing new branches of the WSPU in the North of England and the Midlands.

In November 1908, Baines was to be tried of unlawful assembly at the Coliseum in Leeds, the first ever member of the WSPU to be tried by jury. Refusing to be bound over, she was convicted to six weeks imprisonment in Armley Goal, Leeds because "she did ‘not recognise the laws of this Court administered by men".

One of the first to advocate militant methods, Baines was imprisoned some fifteen times for her part in protests. In July 1909 with twelve others, including Mary Leigh, Lucy Burns, Alice Paul, Emily Davison and Mabel Capper and another in her wheelchair [May Billinghurst perhaps] she was jailed for obstruction for trying to stop Lloyd George's public budget meeting in Limehouse. The protest was witnessed by Annie Barnes who was inspired to join the East London Federation and influenced by Sylvia Pankhurst. On the way to Holloway prison the women arrested had shouted and sung protests and demanded to be treated in 'first division' in their own clothes as 'political' prisoners rather than criminals, this was not granted and the women broke 150 panes of glass at the prison and refused to give their names, prison officers had to use 'force necessary' to get the women into prison clothes. In Liverpool, in 1910, Baines was making speeches with Ada Flatman and Patricia Woodlock, when she was interrupted by Constance Lytton disguised as 'Jane Wharton' a seamstress asking 'the men and women of Liverpool to be the first to wipe out the stain [of force-feeding]' and a crowd followed them to the prison Governor John Dillon's house, chased by police.

In July 1912, Baines was part of an attempt, under the name 'Lizzie Baker' along with Gladys Evans and Mary Leigh and Mabel Capper, to burn down the Theatre Royal in Dublin the night before a scheduled visit from then Prime Minister, H.H. Asquith, to speak on Home Rule. For this Baines was sentenced to seven months hard labour and Central Bridewell Prison, Dublin. Joining her fellow suffragette prisoners on hunger strike, she was released after five days.

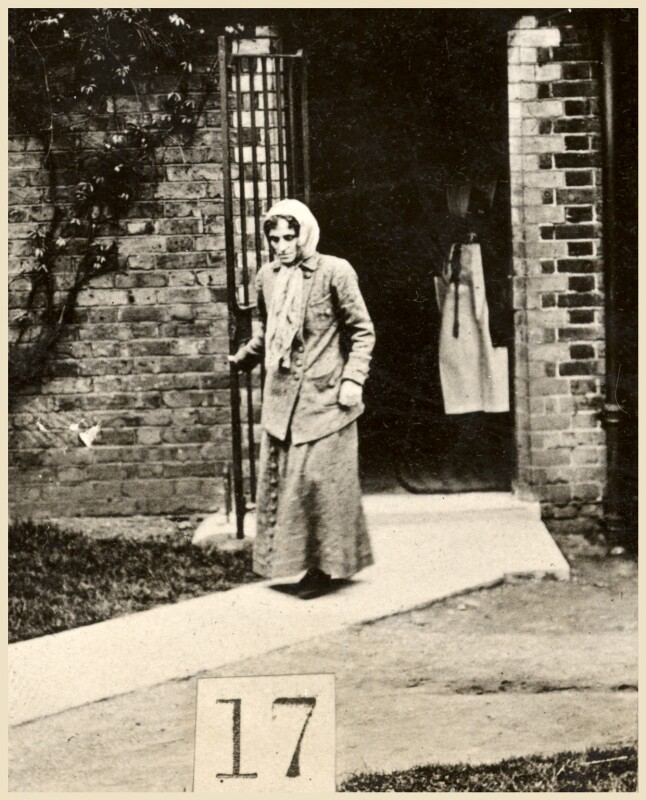
Jennie Baines, a prisoner - taken by the Criminal Record Office.

The next year, on 8 July 1913, with her husband George and son Wilfred, Baines was accused of attempting to bomb first-class railway carriages at a Lancashire and Yorkshire railway siding, and leaving suffragist material, near where they lived in Manchester. A bomb, loaded revolver, masks and cutting tools and two catapults were found at their premises. As a result, her husband and son were charged with malicious damage and not imprisoned, but Baines was re-arrested under the 'Cat and Mouse act' and imprisoned at Holloway Prison. She again went on hunger strike, refusing food and water, and was released in a 'very serious condition'.

Baines suffered from chorea ("St Vitus' Dance") causing spasms brought on by emotional stress, making it almost impossible to force-feed her. Baines is likely to have been given a Hunger Strike Medal 'for Valour'.

In May 1913 another arrest for obstruction during a meeting in Hyde Park, and a month sentence led WSPU leaders to determine that her health could not endure another stint in prison, so Baines and her family were smuggled into Wales as the 'Evans' family and set sail aboard The Ballarat, bound for Australia, before their trial (as a family) was due in November 1913. The trial went ahead and acquitted George and Wilfred Baines. WSPU saw this migration as a reward for all Baines had done, as Australia had achieved the female federal vote in 1902.

== Later life in Australia ==
After being smuggled out of England, Baines arrived in Melbourne, Australia in December 1913, aged 47. Adele Pankhurst would later arrive in 1914.

Upon settling in the Melbourne suburb of Fitzroy, the Baines family joined the Victorian Socialist Party and the Labour Party while Sarah busied herself working with the Women's Political Association as early as January 1914 and co-founded the Women's Peace Army. With Adele Pankhurst, Baines campaigned against World War I conscription in 1916-1917 and against the spiralling cost of living, as profiteering. Both were sentenced to nine months imprisonment but were freed on appeal on a legal technicality.

Baines was again jailed in March 1919 for flying the prohibited red flag on the Yarra Bank and became the first prisoner in Australia to undergo hunger strike. A special Federal Cabinet meeting was held and her release after four days starving was secured on the advice of the Attorney-General. In 1920, Baines helped establish the Communist Party in Victoria. Five years later, she would be expelled and this saw her rejoin the Labour Party. In 1926, the family relocated to Port Melbourne and Baines was appointed special magistrate to the Children's Court there from 1928 to 1948.

== Death and legacy ==
Although her post Second World War activities were curtailed by her failing sight, Baines continued her "fiery eloquence on the hustings" until her death from cancer, only giving up public speaking a few months before she died on 20 February 1951 in Port Melbourne.

Survived by her husband and her three children, Baines's legacy could perhaps be summed up in her own words:

'To fight for that which is better and nobler in this world is to live in the highest sense, but to submit and tolerate the evils which exist is to merely vegetate in the sewers of iniquity'. Jennie Baines, quoted in The Socialist, 11 April 1919.

== See also ==
- Adele Pankhurst
- Women's Social and Political Union
- Women's suffrage in the United Kingdom
