= Rosa May Billinghurst =

British suffragette (1875–1953)

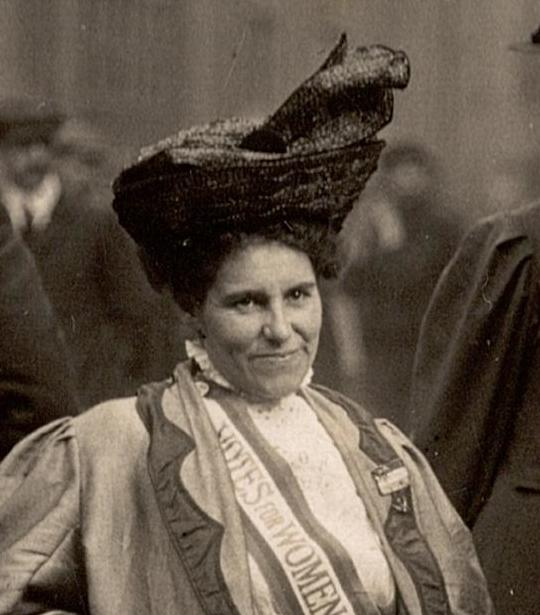
- Billinghurst participating in a demonstration
- Born: 31 May 1875; Lewisham, Kent, England
- Died: 29 July 1953 (aged 78); Twickenham, Middlesex, England
- Occupations: Social worker and teacher
- Organization(s): Women's Liberal Association; Women's Social and Political Union (WSPU); Women's Freedom League (WFL); Equal Pay Film Fund
- Known for: Suffragette activities
- Children: 1

Rosa May Billinghurst (31 May 1875 – 29 July 1953) was a British suffragette and women's rights activist. She was known popularly as the "cripple suffragette" as she campaigned in a tricycle.

== Early life ==
She was born in 1875 in Lewisham, London, the second of nine children of Rosa Ann (Brinsmead) Billinghurst and Henry Farncombe Billinghurst. Her mother came from a family who manufactured pianos and her father was a banker.

As a child she survived polio, which left her unable to walk. She wore leg-irons and used either crutches or a modified tricycle. She became active in social work in a Greenwich workhouse, taught in a Sunday School, and joined the temperance Band of Hope.

== Politics ==
She was an active member of a Women's Liberal Association (fifteen of which joined in 1887 to become the Women's Liberal Federation that ultimately grew to 942 affiliated associations) and later, in 1907, a member of the Women's Social and Political Union (WSPU). She took part in the WSPU march to the Royal Albert Hall in South Kensington, London, in June 1908. Billinghurst helped organise the WSPU response in the July 1908 Haggerston by-election; polling was on the day that twenty-four suffragettes were released from Holloway prison and came around the area canvassing to 'keep the Liberal out.' In 1909, she was presumed by Annie Barnes to be the wheelchair user seen distracting a police horse, who laughed as another woman seemed to tip the rider off to fall in a horse trough. The occupant of the wheelchair was the one arrested and rough-handled into a waiting police van.

Two years later, she founded the Greenwich branch of the WSPU. As its first secretary she took part in the '1910 Black Friday' demonstrations, using an adapted tricycle for mobility. She was arrested after the police capsized her from the trike. Billinghurst knew that she was helpless when this happened, but she was quite prepared to take the added publicity to benefit the cause of suffrage. The police once exploited her disability leaving her in a side street after letting her tyres down and pocketing the valves.

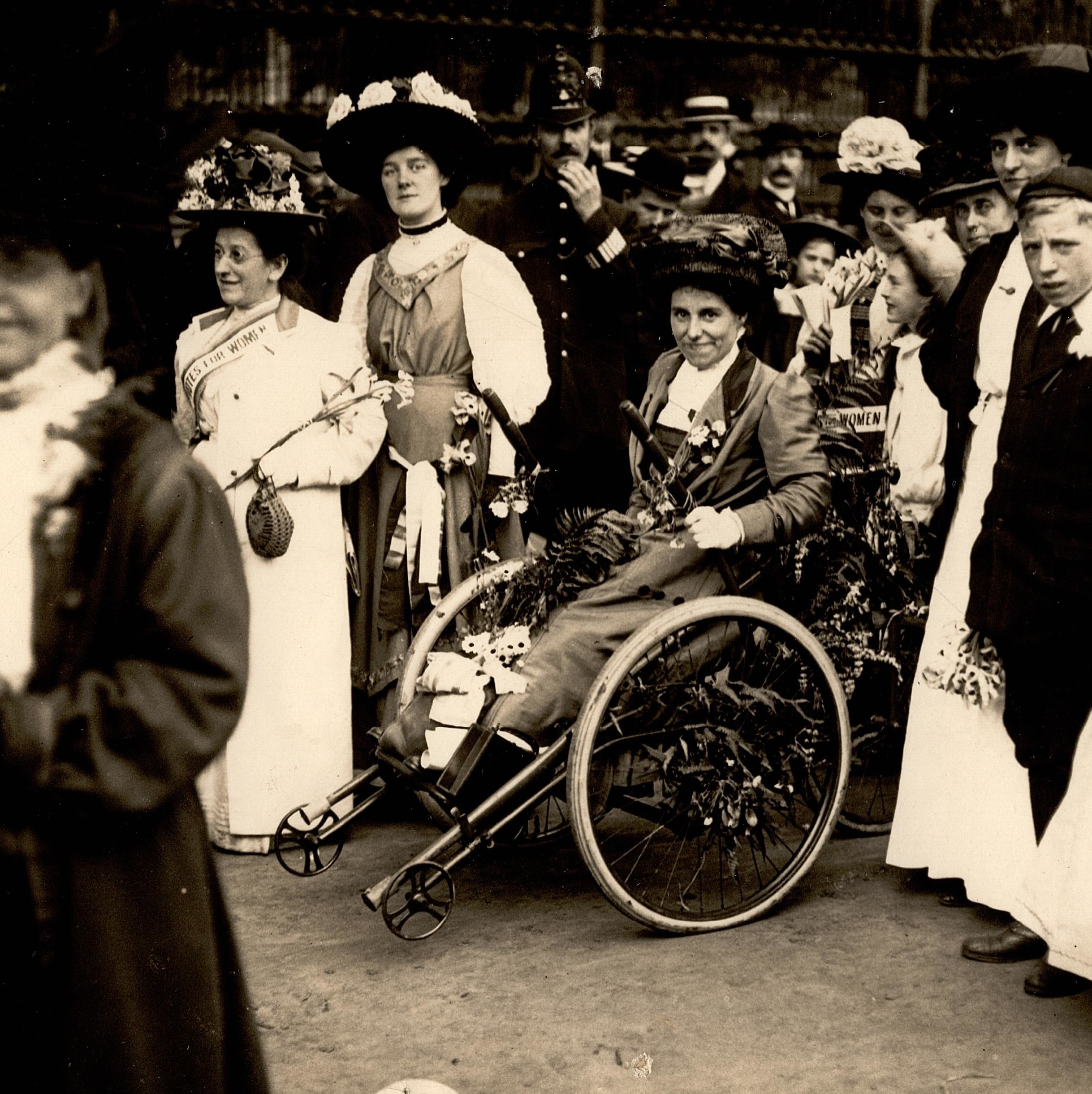
Billinghurst participating in a demonstration with her crutches in place on either side of her tricycle

Billinghurst was able to get closer to the House of Commons on another occasion in 1911, when police thought the better of attacking her trike with 'Votes for Women' banner during the rush. She is thought to have been one of the suffragettes to evade the 1911 census on the night of Sunday 2 April 1911 in response to the calls from suffragette organisations for a boycott.

Billinghurst would place her crutches on both sides of her tricycle and would charge any opposition. She was arrested several more times in the next few years.

The Glaswegian suffragette Janie Allan apparently worked in partnership with Billinghurst during the window-smashing campaign of March 1912, with Billinghurst apparently hiding a supply of stones under the rug that covered her knees. Billinghurst's first stint in Holloway Prison was for smashing a window on Henrietta Street during this campaign, for which she was sentenced to one month's hard labour. The prison authorities were confused regarding her sentence to hard labour, and gave her no extra work. She was befriended by many other prisoners, including Dr. Alice Stewart Ker, who had Billinghurst smuggle a letter out to Ker's daughter on her release.

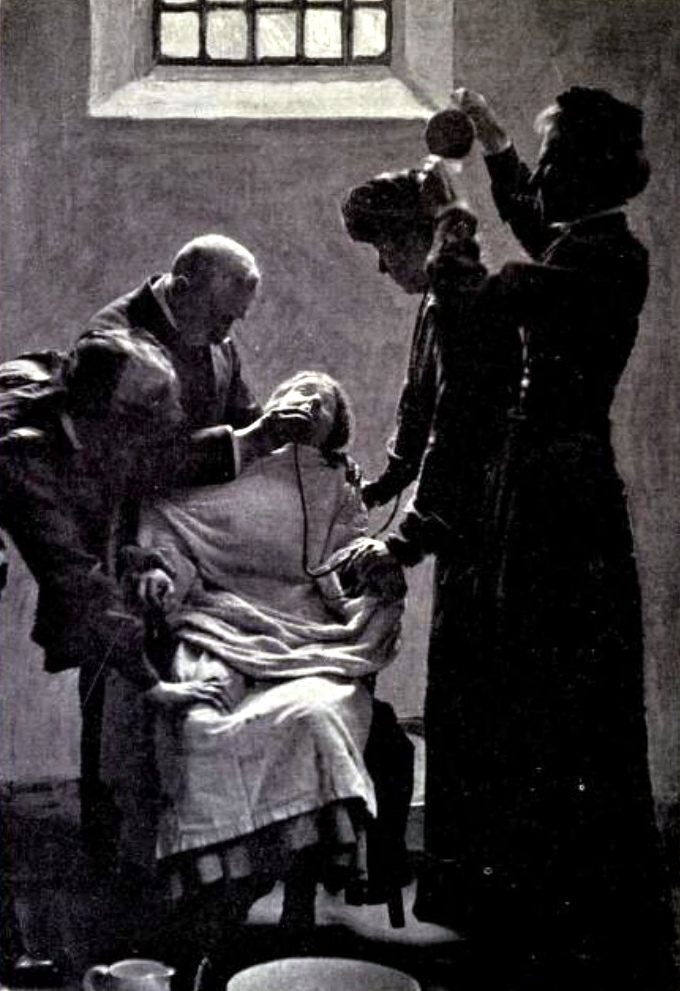
Nasal force-feeding of an imprisoned suffragette

On 8 January 1913, she was tried at the Old Bailey and sentenced to eight months in Holloway Prison for damaging letters in a postbox. Billinghurst represented herself in court to plead the case for women's suffrage. Her defence titled "The Guilt Lies on the Shoulders of the Government" was published in The Suffragette. She subsequently went on a hunger strike, and was force-fed along with the other imprisoned suffragettes participating in the strike. She became so ill that she was released two weeks after her force-feeding began.

Billinghurst was given a Hunger Strike Medal "for Valour."

She spoke at a public meeting in West Hampstead in March 1913. On 24 May she chained herself to the gates of Buckingham Palace and on 14 June she was dressed in white on her trike in the funeral procession for suffragette Emily Wilding Davison, who was killed while reaching for the reins of the King's horse at the Epsom Derby.

Billinghurst also took part in the mass deputation of suffragettes to petition King George V on 21 May 1914. Although she was not arrested, two policemen deliberately tipped her out of her tricycle.

Billinghurst supported the Pankhursts' lead when they decided to prioritise the war over the campaign for women's rights. She helped in Christabel Pankhurst's campaign to be elected in Smethwick in 1918. However, she had joined the Women's Freedom League (WFL) and became part of the Suffragette Fellowship. She supported Jill Craigie's Equal Pay Film Fund.

Billinghurst stopped her activity for women's suffrage after the Parliament (Qualification of Women) Act 1918 gave some women the vote. She later attended the funeral of Emmeline Pankhurst and the unveiling of Emmeline's statue in 1930.

== Family ==
In 1911, she was residing with her parents at 7 Oakhurst Road, Lewisham, London.

Billinghurst lived in the garden house of her property "Minikoi", Sunbury, Surrey (then in Middlesex), with her adopted daughter, "Beth". Beth has since written a book describing her relationship with her adoptive mother. Her brother was Alfred John Billinghurst, an artist, with whom she lived after 1914.

== Death ==
She died on 29 July 1953 at a hospital in Twickenham, leaving her body to science.

== Posthumous recognition ==
Her name and picture (and those of 58 other women's suffrage supporters) are on the plinth of the statue of Millicent Fawcett in Parliament Square, London, unveiled in 2018.

== Other sources ==
- List of suffragists and suffragettes
- Tejera, P. (2018). Reinas de la carretera. Madrid. Ediciones Casiopea. ISBN 9788494848216 (paper) / ISBN 9788494848223 (digital). Spanish edit.

== Archives ==
The archives of Rosa May Billinghurst are held at The Women's Library at the Library of the London School of Economics.
