= Nellie Godfrey =

English suffragette

Nellie Godfrey was an English suffragette, who was awarded the Hunger Strike Medal.

== Biography ==
Godfrey was a suffragette and was arrested on three occasions. Her name appears on the WSPU Holloway Prisoners Banner.

In 1909, Winston Churchill (then the Member of Parliament for Dundee, was President of the Board of Trade) was speaking in Bolton in the run-up to the January 1910 General Election. Godfrey broke through strong timber barricades erected by police to throw a lump of iron wrapped in paper at Churchill's car. The paper bore the message "thrown by a woman of England as a protest against the Government’s treatment of political prisoners."

Godfrey was arrested and stood trial at Bolton Magistrates Court, pleading guilty. She was fined 40 shillings and refused to pay so was sentenced to a week in prison. She went on hunger strike during her incarceration and was awarded the Hunger Strike Medal. She was discharged from prison on medical grounds. At the time of her arrest, Godfrey had been working as a businesswoman.

Her date of birth and death are unknown.
