= Gladys Roberts =

English suffragette (1888–1975)

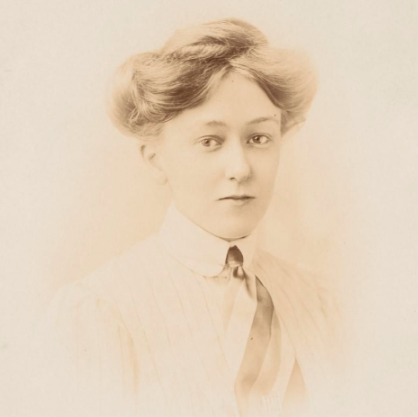
- Born: 1888; Bradford, West Riding of Yorkshire, England
- Died: 1975 (aged 86–87); Oxfordshire, England
- Occupation: Suffragette
- Organization: Women's Social and Political Union

Fanny Gladys Roberts (c. 1887/1888 – 1975) was an English suffragette. She was a member of the Women's Social and Political Union (WSPU) and was imprisoned for her militant campaigning.

== Biography ==
Roberts was born in Bradford, West Riding of Yorkshire, England. She took a typing course and worked as a solicitors clerk.

Roberts joined the Women's Social and Political Union (WSPU) in 1907 and became Secretary of the Bradford branch. She was arrested for throwing stones on 26 June 1909, while part of a deputation to King Edward VII, and was sentenced to a month imprisonment in the second division. She was arrested on two more occasions.

Roberts cannot be located on the 1911 census, so may have evaded the census as part of the suffragette's 1911 census boycott.

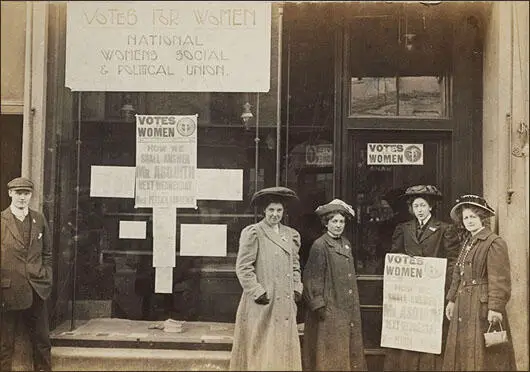
Roberts with Theresa Garnett, Nelly Crocker and Edith New in 1909

By mid 1911, Roberts was living in Nottingham and was Secretary of the local branch of the WSPU. In 1912, Roberts was among the 100 women who travelled from Nottingham to London in support of the second reading of the Conciliation Bill. After the reading, Roberts was arrested for window smashing at the King's Road Post Office, went on trial at Bow Street court and was refused bail. She was sentenced to imprisonment in HM Holloway Prison for three months with hard labour.

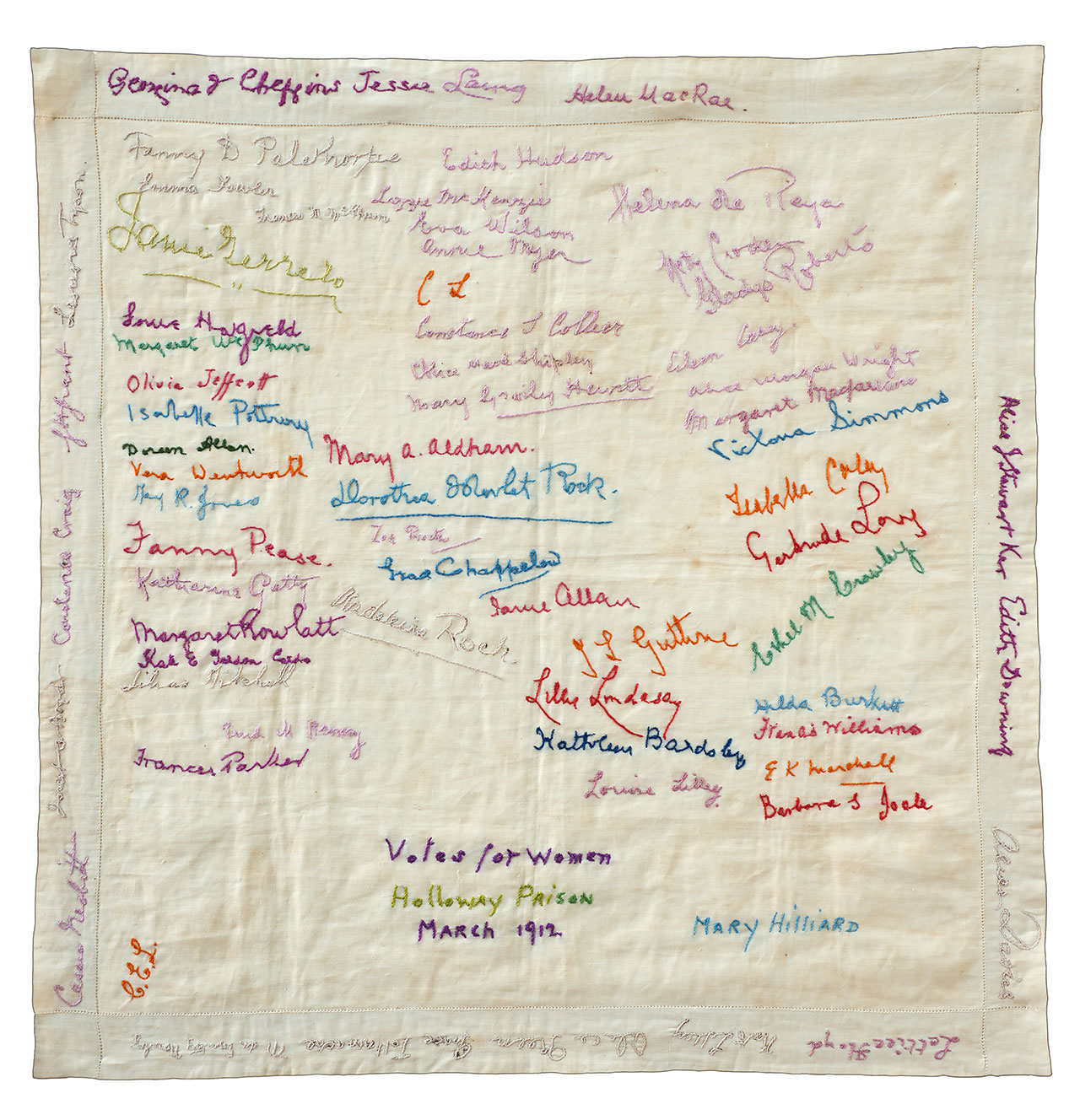
The Suffragette Handkerchief

During her imprisonment, Roberts wrote to fellow Nottingham suffragette Helen Kirkpatrick Watts that she was imprisoned in the company of Louise Garrett Anderson, Emmeline Pankhurst and Ethel Smyth. She also went on hunger strike for five days and six hours with another suffragette called Florence Cook. Roberts kept a shorthand diary that documents her experiences, writing that letters were smuggled out by prisoners who were released.

During one of her periods of incarceration in prison, Roberts was "delighted" to find an inscription praising Christabel Pankhurst that had been scratched into her tin knife by a previous suffragette prisoner.

Roberts name is an embroidered on The Suffragette Handkerchief which is held in the collection of the Sussex Museums.

Roberts died in 1975 in Oxfordshire, England.

== Legacy ==
The Museum of London holds a postcard of Roberts and another of Roberts with Theresa Garrett, Nellie Crocker and Edith New at the Hawick by-election. Her Holloway brooch was auctioned at Christie's in 1981.
