= Ellen Crocker =

British suffragette

Ellen Nelly Crocker
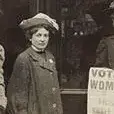
- in 1909
- Born: 1872
- Died: 1962 (aged 89–90)
- Other names: Ellen, Nellie
- Organisation: Women's Social and Political Union
- Known for: suffragette activism
- Political party: Liberal - left to join WSPU
- Relatives: Emmeline Pethick-Lawrence and Dorothy Pethick (cousins)

Ellen Crocker (1872–1962) was an English suffragette.

== Life and activism ==
Ellen Crocker (also known as Nelly or Nellie) was born in 1872 in Stogumber, Somerset. Her father was a doctor, and she had a sister, Emma Crocker. Her cousins were WSPU treasurer Emmeline Pethick-Lawrence and Dorothy Pethick.

Crocker joined the suffragette movement but left when her cousin Emmeline Pethick-Lawrence and husband Frederick were expelled from the Women's Social and Political Union by the Pankhurts.

In 1906, Crocker was a strong Liberal Party supporter, honorary secretary to the Wellington's Women's Liberal Association but became disillusioned in 1907 and left the party of 'a Government which persecutes women' to join the campaign for women's suffrage to avoid being a 'traitor to her sex'.

Crocker spoke at the founding meeting of the Bath branch of the Women's Social and Political Union (WSPU) and was the first suffragette prisoner to stay at Emily Blathwayt's Eagle House. She eventually planted a tree at Annie's Arboretum on a later visit in February 1911, to commemorate her imprisonment suffering (an Abies magnifica).

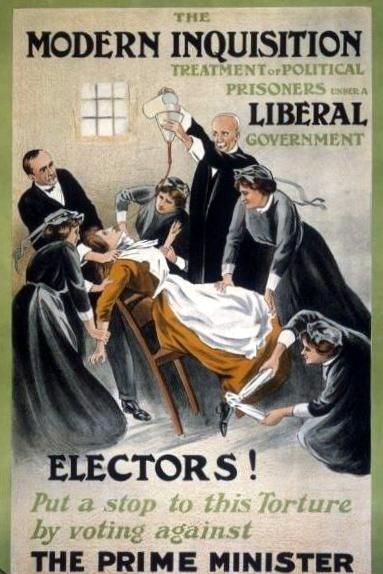
Poster against Liberal government for force-feeding prisoners

Crocker had gone with Emmeline Pankhurst, Nellie Martel, Rachel Barratt and Aeta Lamb to lobby against the Liberals in the by-election of Mid-Devon, a staunch Liberal seat since the late 1880s. During the campaign events in Newton Abbott, there were incidents where 'young roughs' turned the lorry they were on round and round and threatened to tip them off it, and also used foul language. The Conservatives won the seat and suffragettes were accused of splitting the Liberal vote. She helped WPSU campaigns at seven by-elections, once having a driver with an iron bar for protection in his vehicle.

Crocker was one of the main platform speakers at the Hyde Park rally in 1908, and had four days imprisonment that year.

In 1909, she was organiser at WPSU Yorkshire's Sheffield branch and then in the Nottingham area. She was succeeded in 1912 as Nottingham organiser by Charlotte Marsh. Crocker was arrested with fellow activists in 1909 including at the House of Commons and at a meeting of Winston Churchill in Leicester. She went on hunger strike for four days and was force-fed in prison. Once in imprisonment she had to read only the Bible and a book called How to have a Happy Home and Keep It. Another time she criticised the Prison Governor for not removing his hat to address her.

Crocker was arrested eight times for suffragette activism and on 1 March 1912 went to Holloway Prison to serve three months with hard labour. Her crime was breaking the Post Office windows with Nellie Taylor in Kings Road. In Bow Street court she explained her actions were against police brutality following the events on Black Friday when women protestors were violently abused and assaulted, leaving a 'dark shadow'. She also objected to the severe sentences for Alan MacDougall and William Ball.

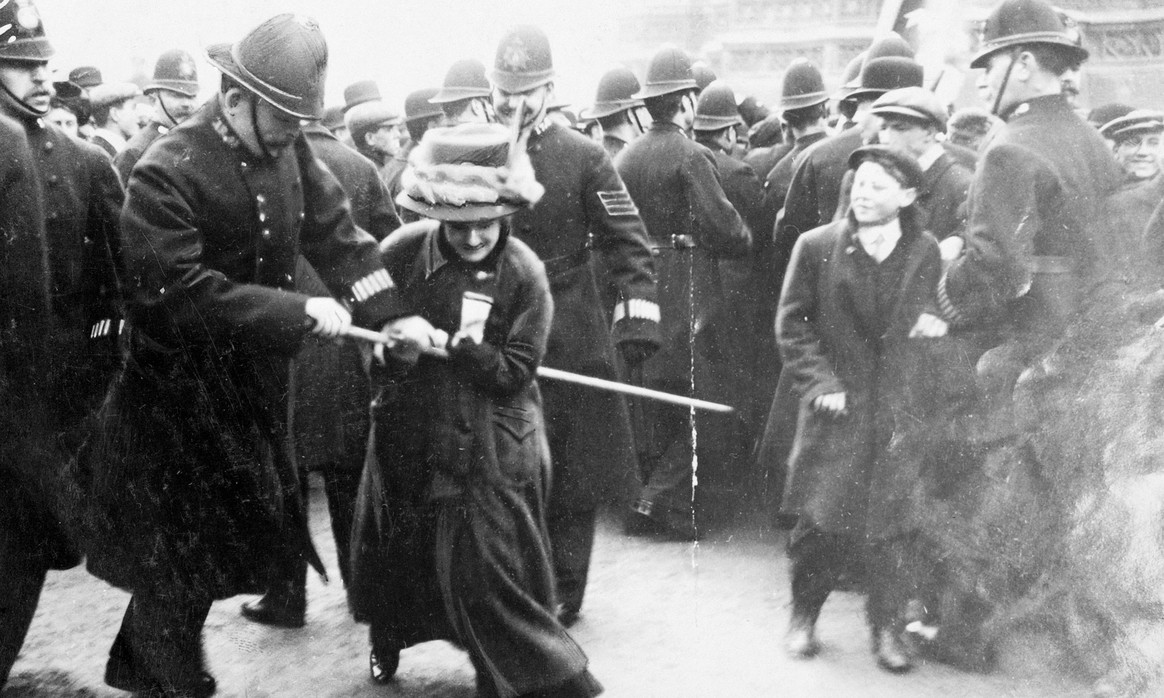
Police and suffragettes on Black Friday in November 1910

Again in Holloway Prison, Crocker went on hunger strike and was force-fed, and hers was one of the signatures sewn on The Suffragette Handkerchief under the wardresses noses.

Crocker took part in the play An Allegory by Vera Wentworth once whilst in Holloway, and played the part, Fear. She wrote in 1912, to her friend and fellow activist, Helen Watts, that she was imprisoned with Louisa Garrett Anderson, Emmeline Pankhurst and Ethel Smyth. She retired from suffrage activism after her cousin Emmeline Pethick-Lawrence and her husband were ousted from the WSPU.

== Later life and legacy ==
Crocker wrote her memoirs Incidents in the Women's Suffrage Campaign and in 1949, donated them to the women's college Girton College, Cambridge. In it she said

Modern Young Women seem unaware of the price paid for their political and social emancipation and modern historians have greatly ignored the struggles.

The Museum of London has a postcard of Crocker with Theresa Garrett, Gladys Roberts and Edith New at the Hawick by-election.

Crocker died in Maida Vale in 1962, leaving the residue of her estate to the Suffragette Fellowship.
