= Lillian Dove-Willcox =

British suffragette (1875–1963)

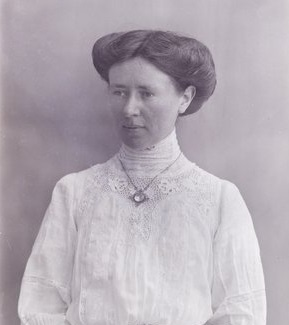
- Born: 1875; Bedminster, England
- Died: 1963 (aged 87–88); London, England

Lillian Dove-Willcox (1875–1963) was a British suffragette who was a member of Emmeline Pankhurst's personal bodyguard.

== Life ==
Dove-Willcox was born in Bedminster, Bristol in 1875. Her husband died in 1908. She was living in Bristol and attended the West of England branch of the Women's Social and Political Union (WSPU). The following year she was arrested at the House of Commons after trying to lobby on behalf of the Women's Social and Political Union on 29 June 1909.

She was sentenced to a month in Holloway Prison and was released early after she went on hunger strike. She and Theresa Garnett were later convicted of assaulting a warder at Holloway. She again went on hunger strike to be released from a ten-day sentence. She returned to Bristol where she, the future policewoman Mary Allen and Annie Kenney were met at the station and a procession of supporters welcomed them.

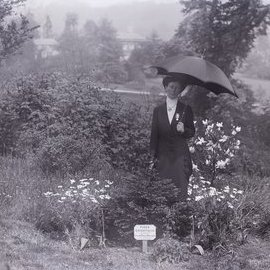
Dove-Willcox planting at tree at Eagle House

Dove-Wilcox was invited to Eagle House at Batheaston in Somerset in 1910. Eagle house was known as "Suffragette's Rest" because of its support for the movement. It was the home of fellow suffragettes Mary Blathwayt and her mother Emily. Emily planted a tree to commemorate every woman who went to prison for the cause. These trees came to be known as "Annie's Arboretum" after Annie Kenney, a local organiser. Dove-Wilcox planted a Picea Orientalis and a lead plaque was installed to record the event on 9 May 1910. Mary's father was a photographer and he recorded the event.

Like the Blathwayts, Dove-Wilcox offered lodging to suffragettes (including the extreme Mary Richardson) at her cottage in the Wye valley. Richardson was devoted to Dove-Willcox and wrote the poem The Translation of the Love I Bear Lillian Dove. Dove-Wilcox took over from Annie Kenney as the leader of the WSPU branch in the West of England in 1911, and organised the 1911 census boycott in Trowbridge. She expressed her loyalty to the Pankhursts by becoming a member of Emmeline Pankhurst's personal bodyguard. When Emmeline was arrested in Glasgow on 9 March 1913. She managed to travel back south on the same train as Emmeline and her guards. Two days later she was arrested at the Houses of Parliament and sentenced to another month in prison.

Some members started to disagree with the WSPU. Emmeline and Christabel Pankhurst demanded greater militancy and in 1913 the organisation and the Pankhurst family split over the issue of arson. Dove-Wilcox joined Sylvia Pankhurst and others who had created the socialist East London Federation of Suffragettes.

Dove-Wilcox supported Edith How-Martyn in later years, documenting the movement in the Suffragette Fellowship. Willcox died in Ealing in 1963.
