= Dorothy Pethick =

British suffragist (1881–1970)

- Born: 1881; Somerset, England
- Died: 1970 (aged 88–89); Markyate, Herefordshire, England
- Education: Cheltenham Ladies’ College; Women's University Settlement
- Occupation: Suffragette
- Organisation(s): Women's Social and Political Union, United Suffragists, British Dominions Woman Suffrage Union
- Relatives: Emmeline Pethick-Lawrence (sister); Nellie Crocker (cousin)
- Awards: Hunger Strike Medal

Dorothy Pethick (1881–1970) was a British suffragette and an organiser of the Women's Social and Political Union (WSPU). She was force fed in prison and was awarded the Hunger Strike Medal.

== Early life ==
Pethick was born in Bristol, Somerset, in 1881. Her father, Henry Pethick of Cornish farming stock, was a businessman and merchant of South American hide, who became owner of the Weston Gazette, and a Weston town commissioner. The family were religious nonconformists. She was one of 13 children, five who died in infancy. Her elder sister was WSPU treasurer Emmeline Pethick-Lawrence.

Pethick was educated at Cheltenham Ladies’ College, before studying social work at the Women's University Settlement in Blackfriars Road, London. She then worked as a superintendent of a girls' club in Nottingham.

== Early women's suffrage activism ==
Pethick joined the WSPU in 1906. By 1908, she was working with Annie Kenney in Bristol and helped Kenney to organise protests against the visit of Winston Churchill. With Kenney and Adela Pankhurst, Pethick travelled to North Somerset and addressed a crowd of 200 people at Salthouse Fields, receiving "a constant stream of good-humoured chaff and interruptions." Pethick spoke at Hyde Park on Women's Sunday, 21 June 1908.

From 1910 to 1912 Pethick was a paid WSPU organizer in Leicester, where she worked with Dorothy Bowker to open a WSPU office at 17 Highfields Street in the city. Pethick organised open air meetings across Leicestershire, for example in Kibworth, and arranged for Emmeline Pankhurst to speak in Leicester. She also coordinated the suffragette 1911 census boycott in Leicester, organising an all-night evasion party at the suffragettes shop. She supported the opening of a WSPU branch at Market Harborough.

== Imprisonment and force-feeding ==
Pethick was arrested for militant activism in support of women's enfranchisement on three occasions. In June 1909, she protested with the WSPU deputation outside the House of Commons and was arrested with Nellie Crocker (her cousin) and Jessie Lawes.

In October 1909, she travelled with Kitty Marion to Newcastle for the visit of politician David Lloyd George and to protest with fellow suffragettes, an event later dubbed “The Battle of Newcastle." She was directed by Christabel Pankhurst to throw stones at the windows of Newcastle General Post Office whilst shouting "Votes for Women!" After checking that nobody was inside the window Pethick threw her stones.

Pethick was arrested, but as the stones she thrown failed to do any damage she said in court that she was "not guilty of smashing, but guilty of trying to. My action was entirely prompted by the injustice of the present Government, and if it continues in this way, we shall do worse things." She was charged with "wilfully and maliciously" damaging property and was sentenced to 14 days imprisonment with hard labour in Newcastle Gaol. She went on hunger strike and after three days was sent to the prison hospital where she was force fed three-quarters of a pint of milk and egg through a nasal tube by doctors. Pethick struck out at the staff, causing one of their noses to bleed. She was force fed again twice a day and her nostrils became so inflamed that the tube had to be lubricated with glycerine.

Pethick is recalled by fellow suffragette prisoner Lady Constance Lytton in her memoirs as being appointed leader to the group of 12 women who were imprisoned. She said that Pethick:

"was our head and spoke for us. Her face had all the beauty that freshness, youth and grace could give it, and with it all for her age—she was twenty-seven—there was a wonderful strength to it. She spoke civilly to the Governor, but in a very determined way."

After being released from prison, at the same time as Winifred Jones, Pethick and Jones were taken to recover in a nursing home in Rye Hill. After recuperating, Pethick complained to the Government Inspector that the doctors had been rough in their treatment. She wrote about her experiences for the suffrage newspaper Votes for Women, where she complained that she "felt as though she was being treated like a piece of cattle" and described how the nasal tube used to force-feed the women "was not sanitised between feedings, with the tube and the jug which contained the liquid left near a window on an open tray." She also wrote letters to other local and national newspapers to raise awareness of what was done to the prisoners in the wider press. She later reflected that during her imprisonment "I always had a very strong feeling of people like Garibaldi, Mazzini and Joan of Arc with me."

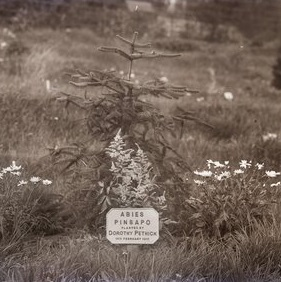
The Abies Pinsapa planted by Pethick at Eagle's House

On 18 November 1910, Pethick participated in the "Black Friday" suffrage event in London and was again arrested. She was released when her fine was paid without her consent.

Pethick was one of the many suffragettes who recuperated and stayed with he Blathwayt family in Batheaston. Emily Blathwayt described Pethick as “an educated lady”. Pethick planted a fir tree Abies Pinsapo on 15 February 1911 in Eagle House's suffragette arboretum. As Pethick and her sister were friends with the Blathwayt and Kenney families, Pethick was among the suffragette women who nursed Annie Kenney's sister Jenny Kenney after she underwent on operation that went wrong and had a serious impact on her physical health.

== After the WSPU ==
In 1912, after her sister Emmeline Pethick-Lawrence and brother in law Frederick Pethick-Lawrence, 1st Baron Pethick-Lawrence were ousted from the WSPU, Pethick resigned from her paid organising role in protest at their treatment.

In 1914, Pethick gave talks on women's suffrage in America and Canada, recounting how she had endued force feeding. When she spoke in Vancouver, tickets to her speech sold out so quickly that many local suffragists could not secure tickets to hear her speak. In New York, she declared to the Equal Franchise Society that the suffragettes were prepared to die for their cause and recounted to the New York Times that force feeding was "exquisite torture." She also spoke in Louisville, Kentucky, Chicago, Illinois, and Toronto.

At the outbreak of World War I, Pethick joined the Women's Police Force. In 1916, she joined the United Suffragists. She later served as honorary treasurer of the British Dominions Women's Suffrage Union.

After her campaigning activities, she worked for many years at the Rudolf Steiner school in Hampstead, London. She was responsible for the education of her godson Martin Viner and placed him in a Steiner school.

Pethick died in 1970 in Markyate, Bedfordshire.
