= Coton, Staffordshire =

Hamlet in Gnosall, Staffordshire, England

Coordinates: 52.77816°N 2.27866°W

Coton is a hamlet in the English county of Staffordshire.

== See also ==
- Listed buildings in Gnosall
