= Edith New =

20th-century English suffragette

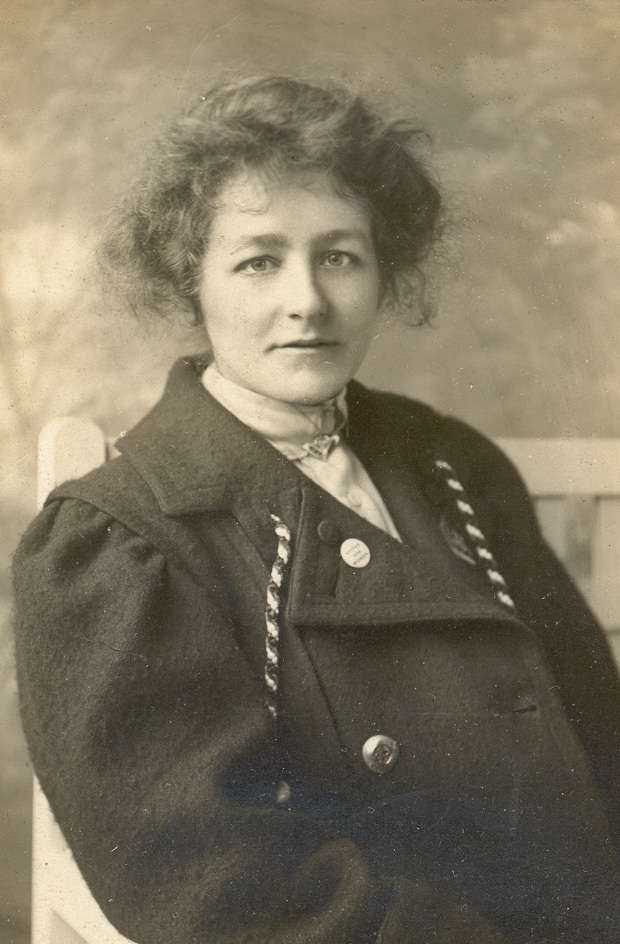
- by Peter Nairn of Hawick
- Born: Edith Bessie New; 17 March 1877; Swindon, England
- Died: 2 January 1951 (age 73); Liskeard, England
- Known for: First suffragette vandal

Edith Bessie New (17 March 1877 – 2 January 1951) was an English suffragette who was one of the first two suffragettes to use vandalism as a tactic. She and Mary Leigh were surprised to find their destruction was celebrated, and they were pulled triumphantly by lines of suffragettes on their release from prison in 1908.

== Early life ==
She was born Edith Bessie New at 24 North Street, Swindon, one of five children of Isabella (née Frampton; 1850–1922), a music teacher, and Frederick James New, a railway clerk, who died when Edith was less than a year old when he was hit and killed by a train. By age 14, she was working as a teacher, later moving to East London in 1901.

== Suffrage activism ==
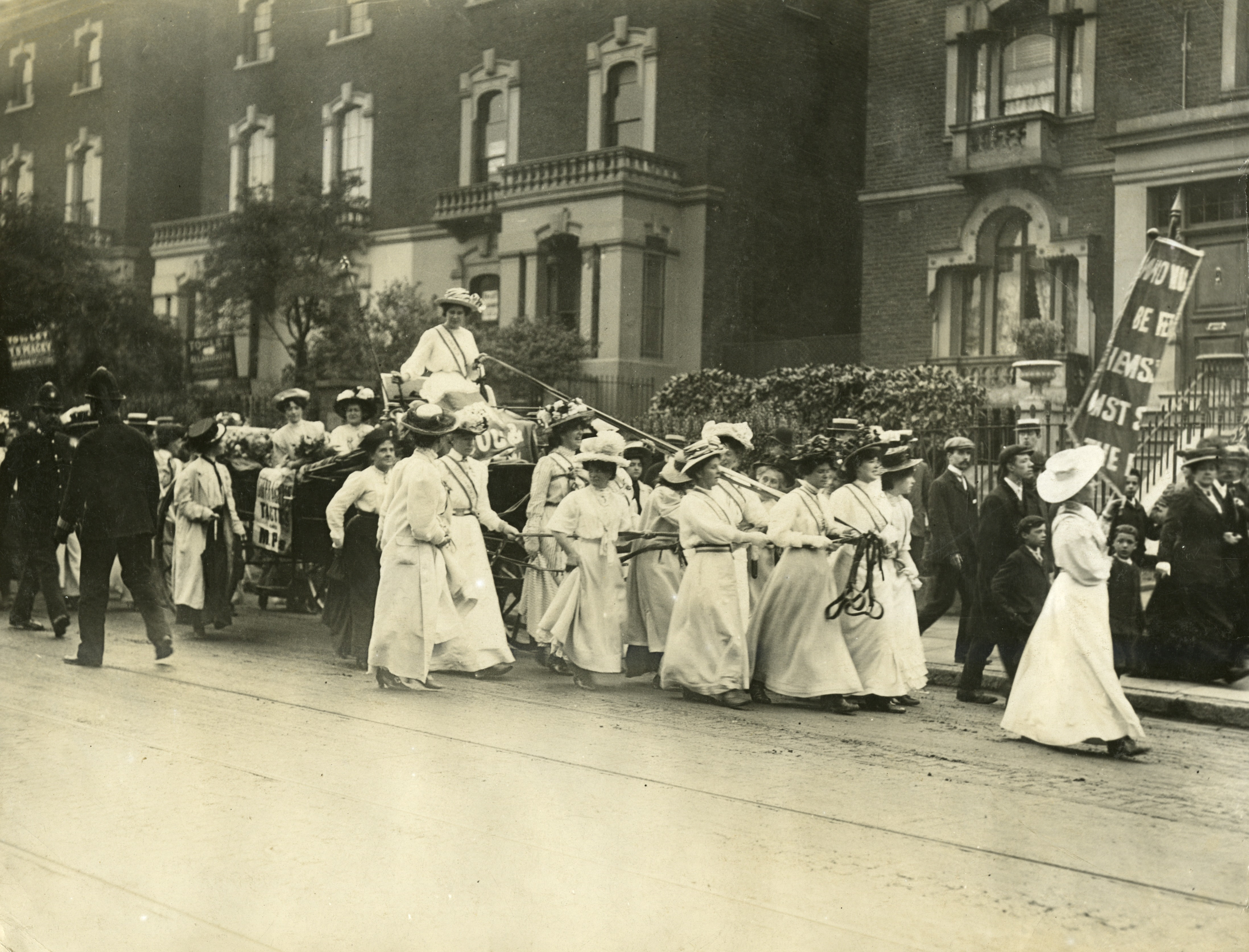
Edith New and Mary Leigh's carriage being pulled from Holloway to Queen's Hall in 1908

In the early 1900s, New left her teaching career and began working as an organiser and campaigner for the Women's Social and Political Union (WSPU). She travelled around England, speaking to groups about the women's movement. In January 1908, New and Olivia Smith chained themselves to the railings of 10 Downing Street shouting "Votes for Women!", to create a diversion for their fellow suffragettes Flora Drummond and Mary Macarthur to sneak in before being arrested. In June 1908, during a protest, New and another suffragette, Mary Leigh, broke two windows at 10 Downing Street. They were arrested and sentenced to two months in prison at Holloway.

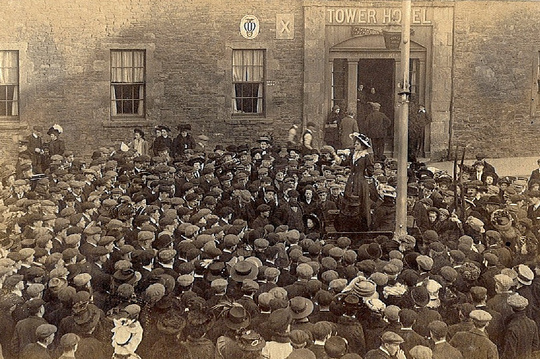
Edith New at Hawick addressing crowds in 1909

It was the first time in the suffrage movement that vandalism had taken place. The women were at first concerned that other suffragettes would not approve of their actions, but Emmeline Pankhurst, a leader of the suffrage movement, visited the women in prison and gave them her approval for using vandalism as a tactic for getting their voices heard. Additional acts of vandalism and arson were planned by the women soon after. During their court sentencing, the women threatened that next time they would use bombs. When they were released from prison in August 1908, a parade was held in their honour by a delegation of suffragettes that included Christabel Pankhurst.

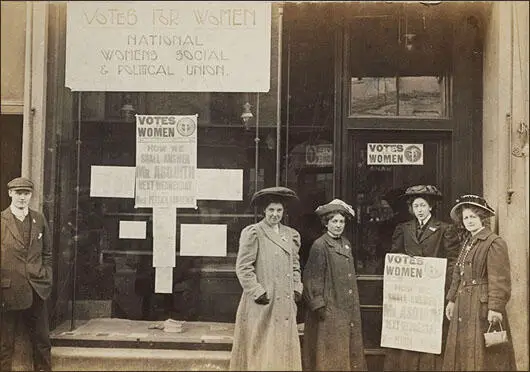
New with Theresa Garnett, Nelly Crocker and Gladys Roberts in 1909

The WSPU presented Edith New with a Hunger Strike Medal 'for Valour' in recognition of her contributions to the suffrage movement. While in prison, she had gone on hunger strike in protest for the woman's right to vote. In 1909, New was pictured in Hawick, Scotland addressing crowds outside the Tower Hotel. That year the WSPU and the rival NWSPU both took shops in Hawick and the police had to intervene when the crowd began to shake the speaker's carriage. In 1911, New left the WSPU and moved to Lewisham to resume her teaching career.

== Later life and legacy ==
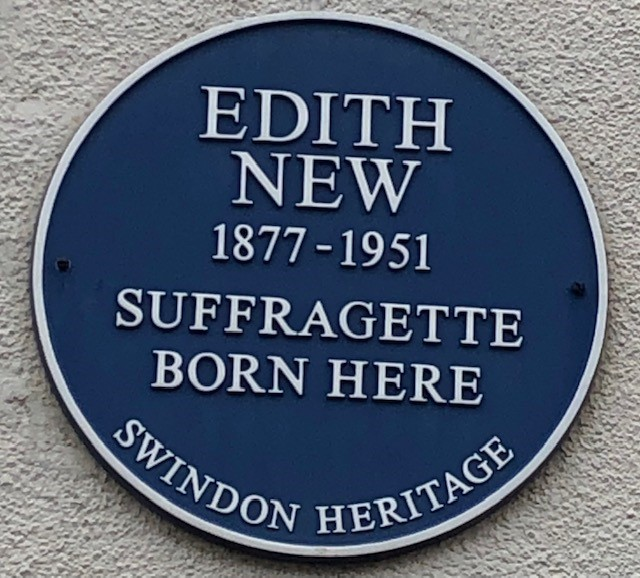
Blue plaque at 24 North Street, Swindon marking Edith New's birthplace

New retired to the small town of Polperro in Cornwall and died in early 1951, aged 73.

In 2011, a street in Swindon was renamed in her honour. A Swindon Heritage blue plaque in North Street, Swindon, was installed on 19 March 2016 marking her birthplace.

== Portrayal in media ==
In the 2015 film Suffragette, a character partially based on New is portrayed by English actress Helena Bonham Carter.
