= Mary Leigh =

English political activist and suffragette

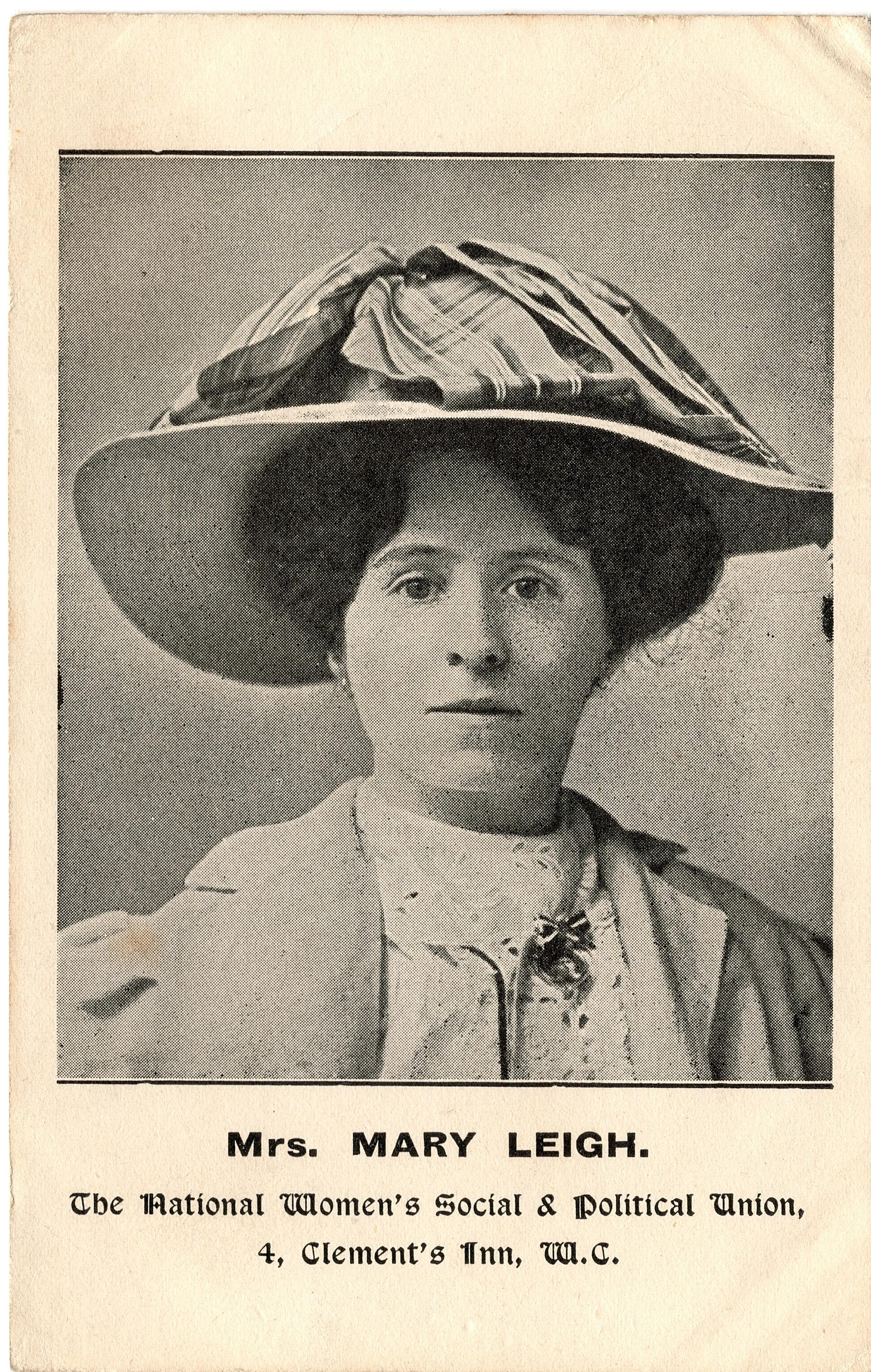
- Born: Mary (or Marie) Brown; 1885; Manchester, England, United Kingdom of Great Britain and Ireland
- Died: 1979 (aged 93–94); Stockport, England
- Occupation: Suffragette
- Organisation(s): Women's Social and Political Union, Suffragettes of the WSPU

Mary Leigh (née Brown; 1885–1979) was an English political activist and suffragette.

== Early life ==
Leigh was born as Mary Brown in 1885 in Manchester. She was a schoolteacher until her marriage to a builder, surnamed Leigh.

== Activism ==
Leigh joined the Women's Social and Political Union (WSPU) in 1906, aged 20 or 21. She was arrested for the first time in 1907, after being part of a deputation to the House of Commons. When in court, she unfurled a WSPU flag, which annoyed the magistrates. She was sentenced to a month in prison.

In 1908 Leigh, Jennie Baines, Lucy Burns, Alice Paul, Emily Davison and Mabel Capper were arrested for trying to stop a Limehouse meeting on the Budget by Lloyd George. Leigh was presented with a clock in recognition of her work for the WSPU, which was inscribed with: "In commemoration of the year 1908, when for taking part in public demonstrations of protest against the political subjection of women, she was sentenced three times to terms of imprisonment amounting to more than six months' incarceration in Holloway, she won by her brave spirit and cheerful endurance the admiration and esteem of all her comrades in the votes for women agitation."

In May 1909, Leigh was appointed drum major of the newly-founded purple, white and green WSPU Drum and Fife Band, paid at a rate of £1 a week. The Band was introduced to publicize the Women's Exhibition at the Prince's Skating Rink in the Knightsbridge area of London.

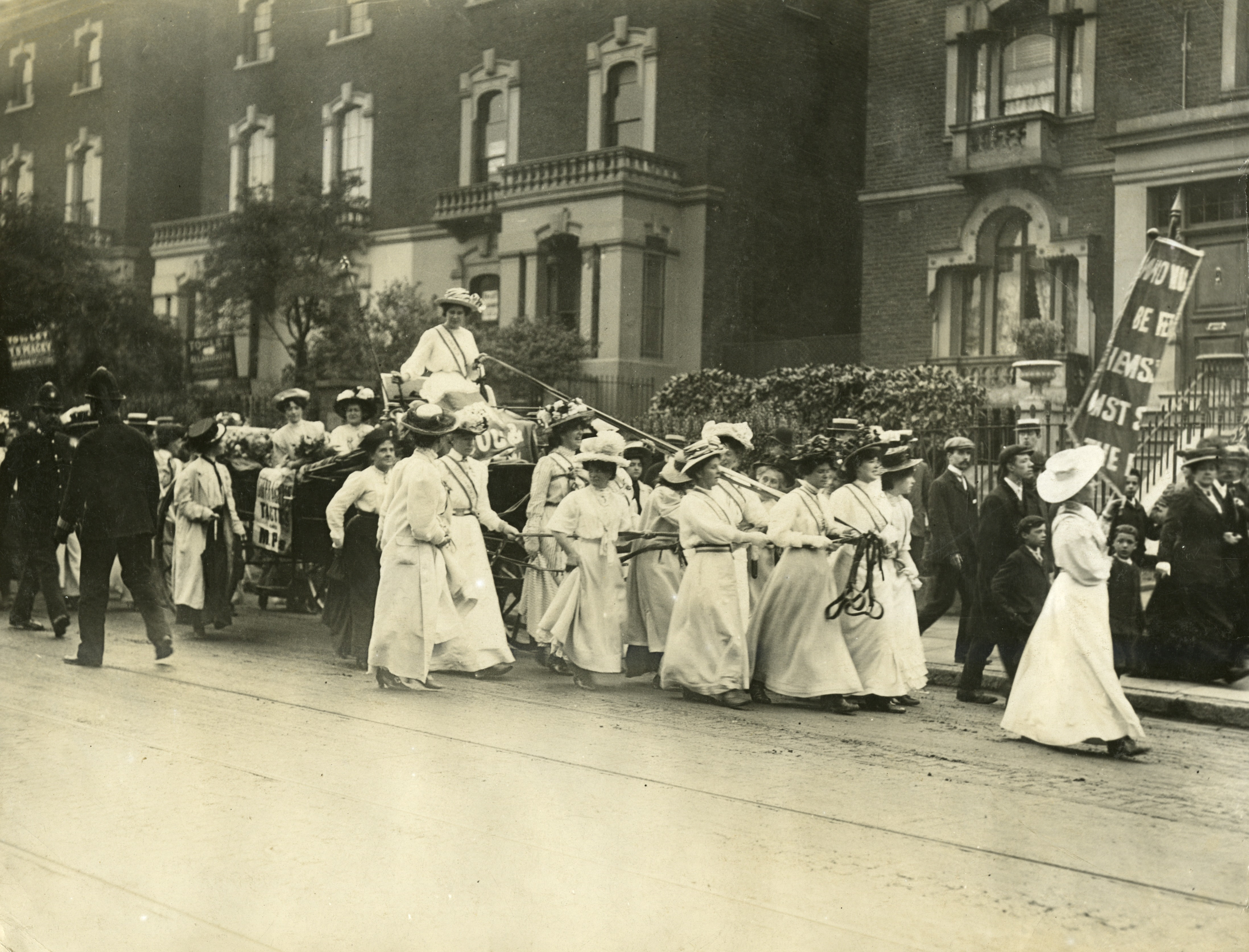
Edith New and Mary Leigh's carriage being pulled from Holloway to Queen's Hall in 1908

On 20th August 1909, Leigh, Bertha Brewster, Rona Robinson and Theresa Garnett, climbed onto the roof of Sun Hall in Liverpool, to interrupt a speech being made by the Secretary of State for War, Richard Haldane.

On 17 September 1909, Leigh, Charlotte Marsh and Patricia Woodlock climbed onto the roof of Bingley Hall in Birmingham to protest at being excluded from a political meeting where the British Prime Minister H. H. Asquith was giving a speech. They threw tiles onto the roof, at Asquith's car and at the police. Leigh was given sentences totalling four months in Winson Green Prison. There she again protested about not being treated as a political prisoner by breaking a window and by going on hunger strike. Leigh and Patricia Woodlock were force-fed in Winson Green gaol in 1909. Leigh had been given a Hunger Strike Medal 'for Valour' by WSPU.

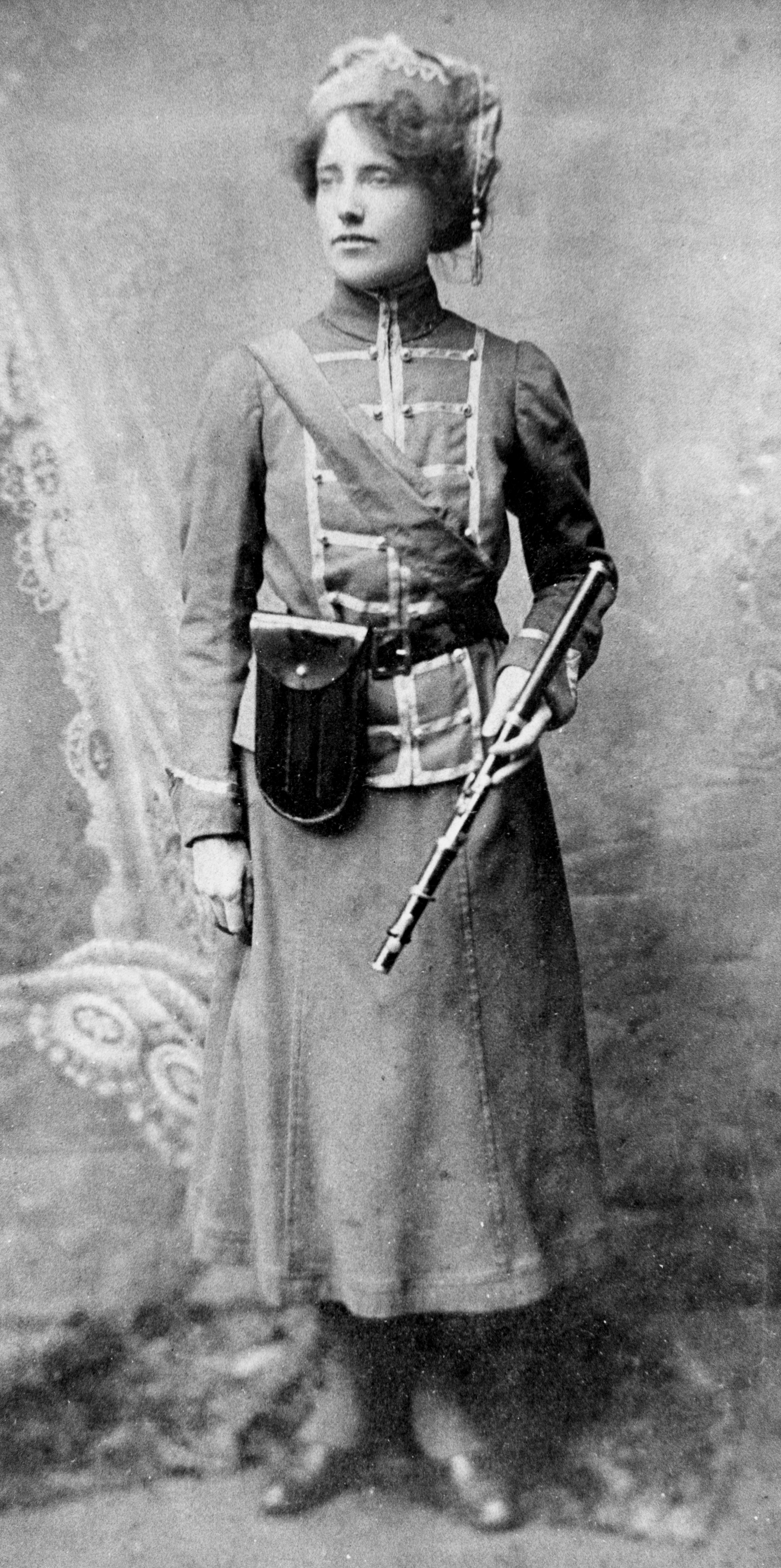
Leigh in the uniform of the WSPU Drum and Fife band, holding a pipe

On 18 July 1912 in Dublin, Leigh threw a hatchet at H. H. Asquith, to which a suffrage message was attached, allegedly hitting and injuring Irish nationalist leader John Redmond instead. She was arrested, was tried on 11 December 1912 and went on hunger strike with fellow suffragette Gladys Evans. Leigh's case was later transferred to the High Court in London.

After Emily Davison was run over by the King's horse at the Epsom Derby in 1913, Leigh and Rose Yates was at the dying Davison's bedside, and headed a guard of honour for the funeral procession. On 13 October 1913, at the Bow Baths in the East End of London, Leigh was hurt when police were hitting women and men protestors with clubs, according to Mrs Pankhurst.

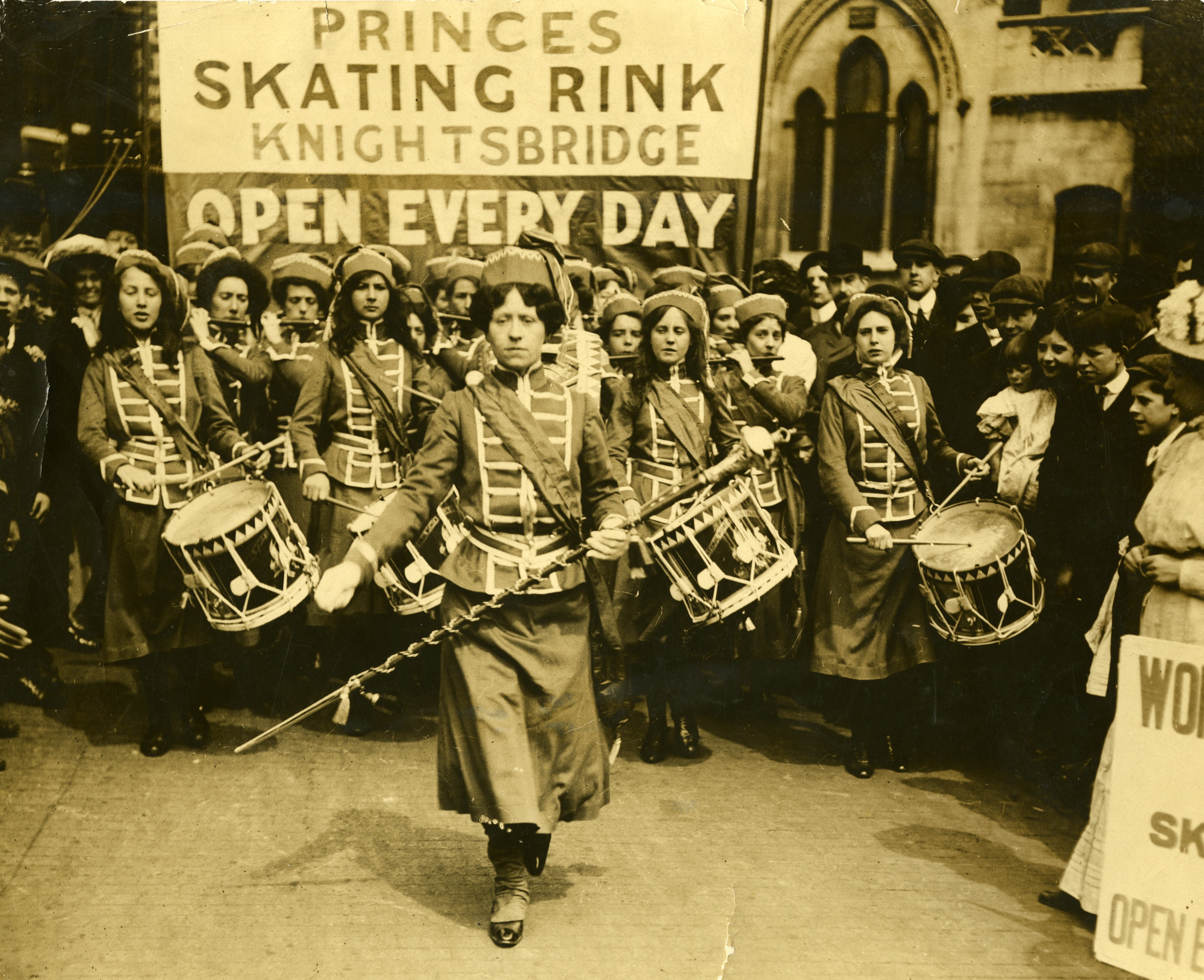
Leigh leading the WSPU Drum and Fife band in 1909

Leigh was unhappy with the WSPU, but refused to leave when Emmeline Pankhurst asked for loyalty or for members to leave. She remained loyal as she felt an ownership for the organisation she had helped create. World War I, however, precipitated a split between Leigh, Yates and other leading suffragettes with Emmeline Pankhurst. Pankhurst had agreed that the WSPU would suspend its militant campaign for female suffrage and back the government's fight against Germany. Leigh and other radicals disagreed with this policy, and broke away to form the "Suffragettes of the WSPU" (SWSPU). The organisation intended to be militant and national but never achieved a large impact. Like the Independent WSPU, it was created in 1916. The SWSPU passed a resolution to concentrate on women's suffrage and to not encourage debate about former WSPU leaders.

== Later life and death ==
Leigh joined the Labour Party and remained a committed socialist, regularly attending the May Day processions in Hyde Park. She was a founder of the Emily Wilding Davison Lodge, a memorial society for her suffrage comrade who died after being struck by the King's horse at the 1913 Epsom Derby, and every year she made a pilgrimage to Morpeth, Northumberland, to tend Davison's grave. She reportedly took part in the first Aldermaston March in 1958. In later years, she continued to recall her time in the WSPU with pride and stood by her actions as a suffragette.

Leigh died in Stockport in 1979.

== Legacy ==
Simon Webb, author of a book on suffragette terrorism, wrote in a letter to The Guardian that Leigh and other radical suffragettes set fire to a theatre full of people and bombed it. They were prosecuted for "endangering life".

== See also ==
- Women's suffrage in the United Kingdom
- Suffragette bombing and arson campaign
- Representation of the People Act 1918
- Representation of the People Act 1928
