= Theresa Garnett =

British suffragette (1888–1966)

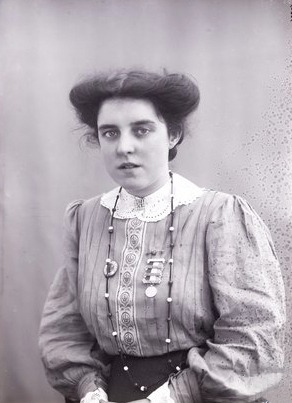
- Garnett in 1909
- Born: 17 May 1888; Leeds, England
- Died: 24 May 1966 (aged 78); Whittington Hospital, London, England
- Known for: Militancy and assaulting Winston Churchill

Theresa Garnett (17 May 1888 – 24 May 1966) was a British suffragette. She was a serial protester who sometimes went by the name 'Annie O'Sullivan', was jailed and then still refused to cooperate. She assaulted Winston Churchill while carrying a whip. She retired from her militancy after the suffragette movement decided to commit arson as part of its protests. She was honorary editor of a women's rights magazine in 1960.

== Early life ==
Theresa Garnett was born in Leeds in 1888, daughter to Joshua Garnett and Frances Theresa Garnett who died when Theresa was 21 days old of "puerperal mania" (postpartum psychosis) in the West Riding Pauper Lunatic Asylum near Wakefield. Garnett was brought up by her paternal grandparents, educated at a convent school, and later worked for some time as a pupil-teacher.

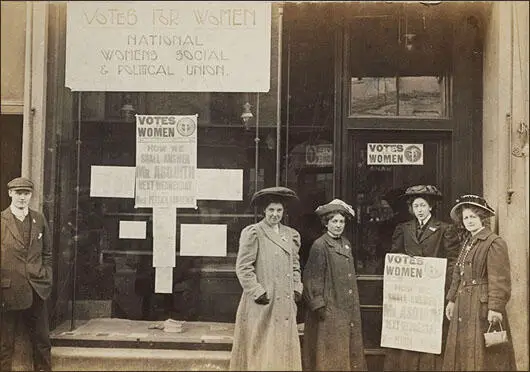
Garnett with Gladys Roberts, Nelly Crocker and Edith New in 1909

== Suffragette activity ==
In 1907, she joined the Women's Social and Political Union (WSPU) after being inspired by a speech given by Adela Pankhurst. In April 1909, she sparked some interest by running about with a whistle before chaining herself, along with four other activists, including Bertha Quinn, Margery Humes and Sylvia Russell to one of the male dignitaries' statues in the Central Lobby of the Houses of Parliament, to protest against a law forbidding precisely this kind of thing – disorderly conduct within the Palace of Westminster when the Parliament was in session. They were not charged.

In June 1909, Garnett and Lillian Dove Willcox were arrested during another attempt to "rush" the House of Commons and convicted of assaulting a warder whilst in Holloway Prison, and were given another ten-day sentence.

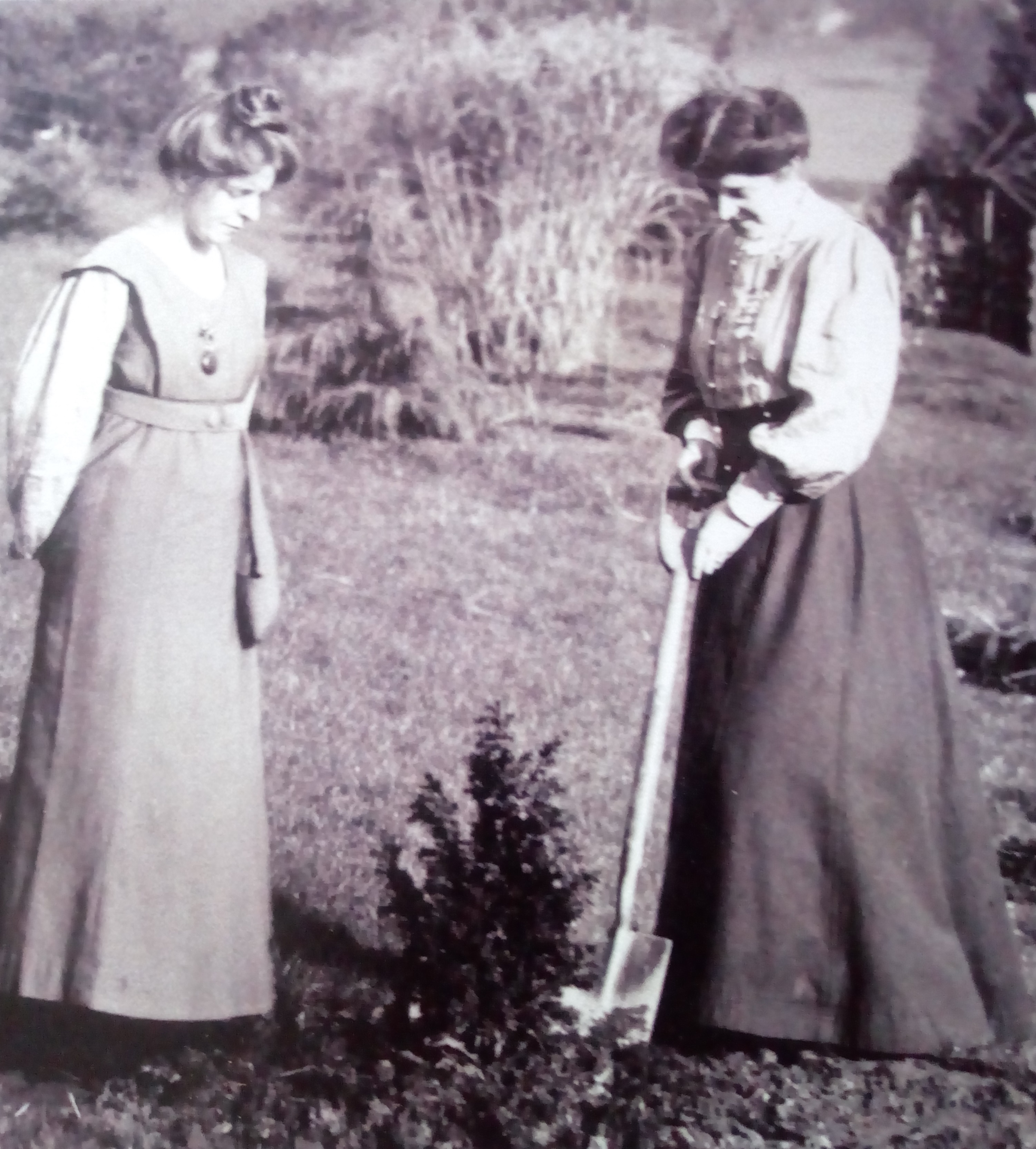
Suffragettes Annie Kenney and Theresa Garnett on 7 November 1909

On 7 November 1909 she was invited to Eagle House at Batheaston in Somerset, which was known as "Suffragette's Rest" because of its links to the movement. It was the home of fellow suffragettes Mary Blathwayt and Emily, her mother. Emily had decided to plant a tree to commemorate every woman who went to prison for the cause. These trees came to be known as "Annie's Arboretum" after Annie Kenney, the local organiser. Garnett planted a Taxus baccata Elegantissima, and a lead plaque was installed to record the event.

The following week, on 14 November 1909, Garnett assaulted Winston Churchill – then an MP and government minister – at Bristol Temple Meads railway station with a dogwhip, cutting him in the face. Arrested, she was sentenced to a month in prison at HM Prison Bristol for disturbing the peace (Churchill did not press charges for the assault itself). She went on a hunger strike, was force-fed, tried to set her cell on fire, and finished her time in hospital. For her actions she received from the WSPU a brooch for her imprisonment and the Hunger Strike Medal for "Valour" in the hunger strike. In 1910, she became organiser for the WSPU in Camberwell, but left the Union after some disagreement about the WPSU's arson campaign.

== World War I ==
During World War I, she worked as a sister at the Royal London Hospital and served on the Western Front with the Civil Hospital Reserve and was commended for her "gallant and distinguished service in the field" in France.

== Post war ==
She remained favourable to the feminist movement, and joined the Six Point Group alongside suffragette Charlotte Marsh who later left her a bequest.

Garnett became honorary editor for the Women's Freedom League bulletin in 1960. She enjoyed connecting with the Suffragette Fellowship.

Garnett died in 1966, leaving very little in her estate.

== Bibliography ==
- Elizabeth Crawford, The Women's Suffrage Movement: A Reference Guide, 1866–1928, Routledge, 2001, p. 237 ISBN 978-0-415-23926-4
