= Mabel Capper =

British suffragette

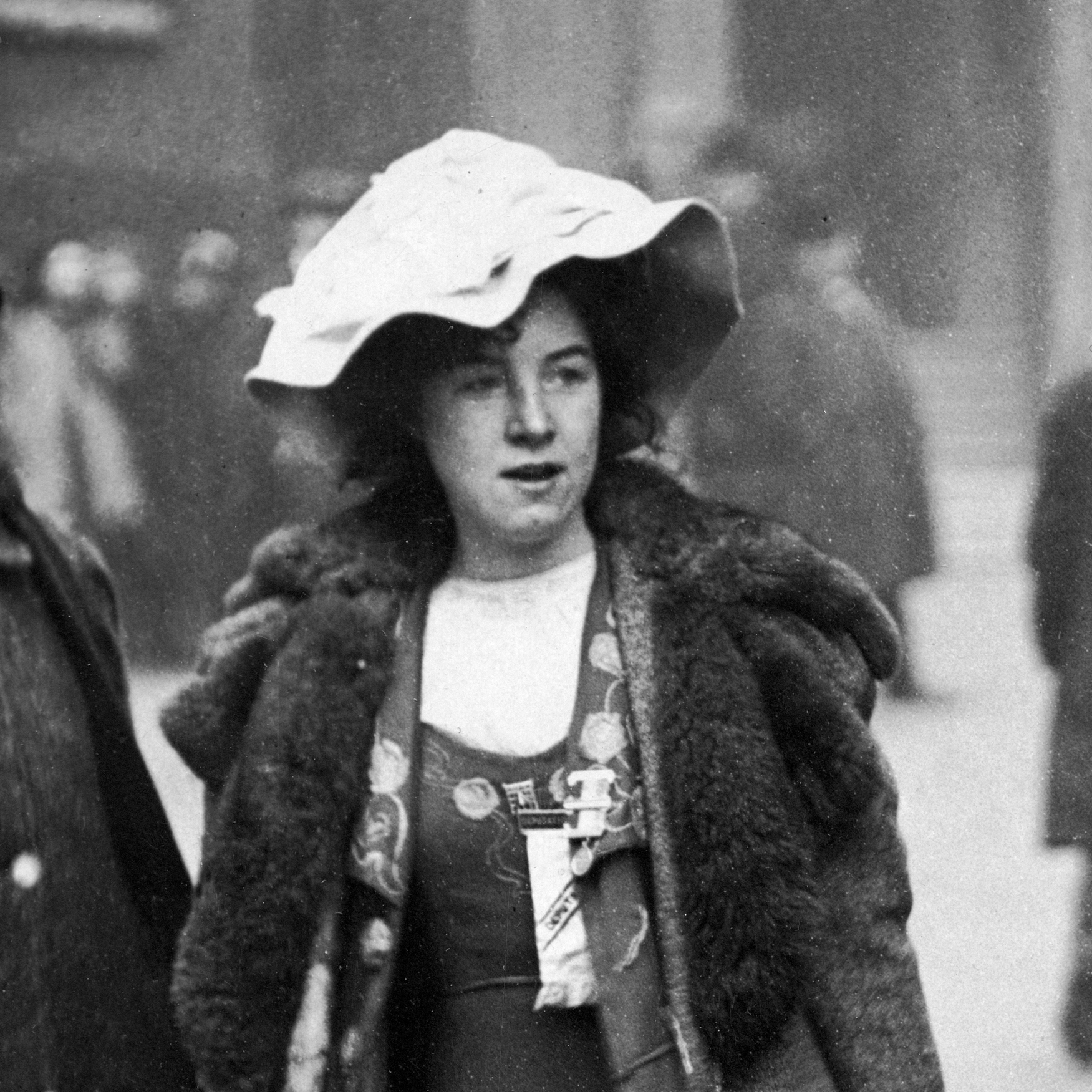
- Born: 23 June 1888; Chorlton-on-Medlock, Manchester, England
- Died: 1 September 1966 (aged 78); St Leonards-on-Sea, East Sussex, England
- Organisation: Women's Social and Political Union (WSPU)

Mabel Henrietta Capper (23 June 1888 – 1 September 1966) was a British suffragette. She gave all her time between 1907 and 1913 to the Women's Social and Political Union (WSPU) as a 'soldier' in the struggle for women's suffrage. She was imprisoned six times, went on hunger strike and was one of the first suffragettes to be force-fed.

== Early life ==
Capper was born in Brook's Bar, Chorlton on Medlock, Manchester, to Elizabeth Jane Crews, (Note: Crews' father, a chemist, had died when she was nine, and her siblings were subsequently divided between foster homes and the Muller Homes orphanages.) herself a suffragette, and William Bently Capper, a chemist and honorary secretary of the Manchester branch of the Men's League for Women's Suffrage. A brother, William Bently Capper, was born in 1890. When the children were still young, the family moved to 21 Oxford Street, Chorlton on Medlock, now Picadilly, Manchester.

== Member of the Women's Social and Political Union ==
- Capper joined the WSPU in 1907 and worked as an Organiser for the Manchester Branch. In 1908 she was living in London and giving her address as 4 Clement's Inn, the same address as the Pethick Lawrence's.
- Capper and Patricia Woodlock, appeared as human noticeboards advertising 1908 women's events in Liverpool and attempted to enter the all-male Royal Exchange, Manchester.

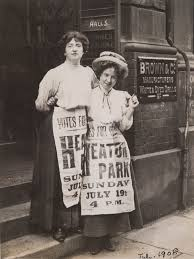
Capper (right) and Patricia Woodlock promoting suffrage events

- In October 1908, Capper took part in the Rush on the House of Commons, together with Christabel Pankhurst, Emmeline Pankhurst and other suffragettes, like Clara Codd with whom she conspired to cause a distraction to get Codd past the police line . Capper appeared in the dock charged with 'wilful obstruction'"wearing a costume composed entirely of the colours of the WSPU, together with a sash, waistbelt and hatband bearing the words "Votes for Women" . She spent one month in Holloway (HM Prison) for refusing to pay the fine that was imposed.
- In July 1909, Capper, together with Mary Leigh, Emily Wilding Davison and up to ten others, was charged with obstructing the police, and Lucy Burns also charged with assaulting a chief inspector, while disrupting a meeting at the Edinburgh Castle, Limehouse, addressed by David Lloyd George. She was sentenced to 21 days imprisonment.
- In July 1909, imprisoned, Capper went on hunger strike and was released after six days.
- In August 1909 Capper was in Birmingham Police court with Mary Leigh and others charged with being disorderly, assaulting the police and breaking windows at a meeting addressed by the prime minister Asquith. She was remanded in Winson Green Prison.
- In September 1909, Mabel Capper, Mary Leigh, Charlotte Marsh, Laura Ainsworth and Evelyn Burkitt, all on hunger strike at Winson Green Prison were the first Suffragettes to be forcibly fed.
- In September 1909, Capper was in Birmingham Police Court with Mary Leigh and others charged with assault on the police, breaking cell windows and disorderly conduct at a meeting addressed by Asquith at Bingley Hall Birmingham. She refused to pay the fine imposed and was imprisoned at Winson Green.
- Capper had been given a Hunger Strike Medal 'for Valour' by WSPU.
- In November 1909, with Selina Martin, Laura Ainsworth, Nellie Hall, Gladys Mary Hazel, Brett Morgan and others, Capper was charged with disorderly conduct and obstruction at a meeting addressed by Asquith in Victoria Square, Birmingham. The police asserted that she had mounted a statue of Queen Victoria and refused to comply with the deputy chief constable's direction to come down.
- In February 1910, together with Dora Marsden and Mary Gawthorpe, Capper brought charges of assault against three men. The Suffragettes alleged that the men; 'well dressed hooligan's', had attacked them, broken and thrown away their flag and then lifting Capper 'bodily over the head of Miss Gawthorpe and put her back in the car head-first' at a Polling Station in Southport which they were picketing. However, the charges were dismissed.
- In November 1910, together with many others, she was in Bow Street Police Court on charges of smashing the windows of the Colonial Secretary in Berkeley Square. She was described by the presiding Magistrate as 'quite a child'.
- In March 1911, together with Emily Wilding Davison, Capper wrote to the Manchester Guardian concerning Churchill's refusal of an enquiry into the treatment of Suffragettes by the Police. She stated that their complaints of mistreatment were 'dismissed as the hysterical ravings of excited women'
- In November 1911, Capper was imprisoned for smashing Bath Post Office windows on the occasion of Lloyd George's visit there.
- In July 1912, together with Mary Leigh, Lizzie Baker and Gladys Evans, Capper was charged with conspiracy to commit grievous bodily harm and wilful and malicious damage and to cause an explosion likely to endanger life and to set fire to the Theatre Royal, Dublin. The Theatre was the venue for a meeting of 4,000 Irish Nationalists to be addressed by PM Asquith. The prime minister was warmly received and, in his speech, he invited suggestions for incorporation in the draft Home Rule bill. Cries of 'Votes for Women' were followed the sound of an exploding handbag and a fire in the cinema projection room. It was reported that one of the defendants later threw a hatchet into the carriage containing the premier. Capper was remanded in Central Bridewell prison during the trial, however, the charges against her specifically were ultimately withdrawn.

== During World War I and afterwards ==
Following the declaration of war on 4 August 1914 and the suspension of Suffragette Militancy, Capper joined the Volunteer Aid Detachment. Later she became involved with the pacifist and socialist movements. From 1919 to 1922, she worked as a journalist for the Daily Herald after the war. In 1921, at Hampstead, she married the writer Cecil Chisholm. There were no children from the marriage.

== Writing ==
In 1908 Capper wrote to the Manchester Guardian to counter the objection to women's enfranchisement on the grounds that they would not be subject to conscription into the armed forces.

She wrote:

"there is no reason in denying the rights of citizenship to women on these grounds. – When our men set out to battle they do not go alone. They are accompanied by an army of women, whose duty it is to tend those stricken in the fight. They endure the same hardships, undergo the same risks. Is their work less noble? Does the State owe them a lighter debt?"

A few years later this point was reinforced by the heroic work of Mabel Anne St Clair Stobart's Women's Convoy Corps and afterwards the Women's National Service League and Stobart's 1913 book War and Women.

In October 1912, Capper's play The Betrothal of Number 13 was produced at the Royal Court Theatre "of working class life, written with a certain amount of sympathetic insight and character" it concerned the stigma imposed by imprisonment, even on the innocent.

Capper maintained her interest in feminism and the lot of the underprivileged throughout her life. In 1963 she wrote of her friend Mary Gawthorpe 's father and "what it meant to be born into a North Country working class family (in) the eighteen-eighties....doomed by the caste system of (the) day to be a leather worker in an age when a stiff fight had to be made against competition from America."

In Capper's 1963 review of Gawthorpe's book Up Hill to Holloway, Capper described how, in 1904, Gawthorpe was called to make her first speech entitled The Children under Socialism "concerning the propriety of providing suitable food and clothing for poor children of the unemployed and needy during the winter"

It was a time of economic depression and, "from the Labour point of view, the aftermath of the South African War." Recruiting for that war "had afforded the usual discoveries of poor physiques, underfeeding and bad teeth." Capper noted that, by 1963, it was difficult to realise "how grudging was the welfare in those days. It all depended on a voluntary basis and funds were exhausted in that winter of 1905. By February a total of 323,414 dinners had been provided...Strictest economy was necessary, and lentils, at about one halfpenny a meal, appear to have been the basic diet."

== Later life ==
Capper moved to Windrush Cottage, Fairlight near Hastings in 1946. In the last ten years of her life she was crippled by osteoarthritis and required full-time nursing care. She died in 1966 in the Leolyn Nursing home, St Leonards-on-Sea. In 2018 the community room at the Warrington Town Hall was renamed the Mabel Capper Room in her memory.

== See also ==
- List of suffragists and suffragettes
