= Genie Sheppard =

British militant suffragette

A Suffragette being force fed, in a contemporary poster

Genie Sheppard (7 October 1863 – 10 April 1953) was a member of the Women's Social and Political Union (WSPU) and militant suffragette who in prison went on hunger strike where she was force-fed for which action she received the WSPU's Hunger Strike Medal.

She was born as Eugenie Sheppard in 1863 in Dudley in Worcestershire, the youngest of four children born to Ellen née King (1829-) and Thomas Sheppard (1829-1904), an ironmonger and town councillor in Dudley. By 1891 she was a student boarding at 8 Regent Terrace in Cambridge while studying medicine at the University of Cambridge. The 1901 Census lists her and her older sister Amy Sheppard as Medical Practitioners lodging at 13 Upper Berkeley Street in Marylebone in London. She was arrested at a demonstration in the West End of London in 1912 during which she and other suffragettes smashed windows with stones and hammers.

On being imprisoned in Holloway Prison Dr. Sheppard went on hunger strike and was force-fed. On her release Sheppard received the Hunger Strike Medal from the leadership of the WSPU. The medal is engraved with the words: "Fed by Force 1/3/12".

She was one of 68 women, among them Emily Davison, who added their signatures or initials to The Suffragette Handkerchief embroidered by prisoners in Holloway in March 1912, and kept until 1950 by Mary Ann Hilliard, and still available to view at the Priest House, West Hoathly.

By 1939 Dr. Sheppard was residing at Sevenoaks in Kent. She died in Tonbridge in Kent in 1953, leaving £20202 in her will. She never married.
