= Helen MacRae =

British suffragette

- Years active: 1909–1914
- Known for: Suffragette activism
- Movement: Women's Social and Political Union
- Relatives: Sisters: Georgiana (Georgie), Betty
- Honours: Hunger Strike Medal for Valour

Helen MacRae (fl. 1909–1914) was a British suffragette who won a Hunger Strike Medal from the Women's Social and Political Union, and was one of those who embroidered the Suffragette's Handkerchief whilst in prison.

== Life ==
Macrae and her sister Georgiana supported women's suffrage. In 1909, they both adopted a 2-year-old girl from South Wales, Hilda Maud. Their third sister was Betty. The sisters lived together as adults and opened their home to recovering suffragettes.

== Activism ==
MacRae was a member of the National Union of Women's Suffrage Societies (NUWSS) but soon joined the militant Women's Social and Political Union (WSPU), and in 1911, she joined with Muriel Sackville (Countess de la War) and her daughter, Marie Corbett and daughters Margery and Cicely, Lilla Durham, and others to establish the East Grinstead Suffrage Society (EGSS). In an EGSS parade through the town on their way to join the Women's Grand March in London, they were jeered by local people and had rotten tomatoes, eggs and turf thrown at them.

MacRae left NUWSS to join WPSU and got to know Edith Downing and Emily Davison. Her first four-month prison sentence in 1910, was for breaking windows in Whitehall.

In 1912, MacRae broke the windows of London toyshop, Hamleys in Regent Street, causing damage valued as £200. On 6 March she appeared at Bow Street Court and was bailed by Mrs Cecil Chapman (whose husband was a magistrate at Tower Bridge Court and was sympathetic to the women's cause).

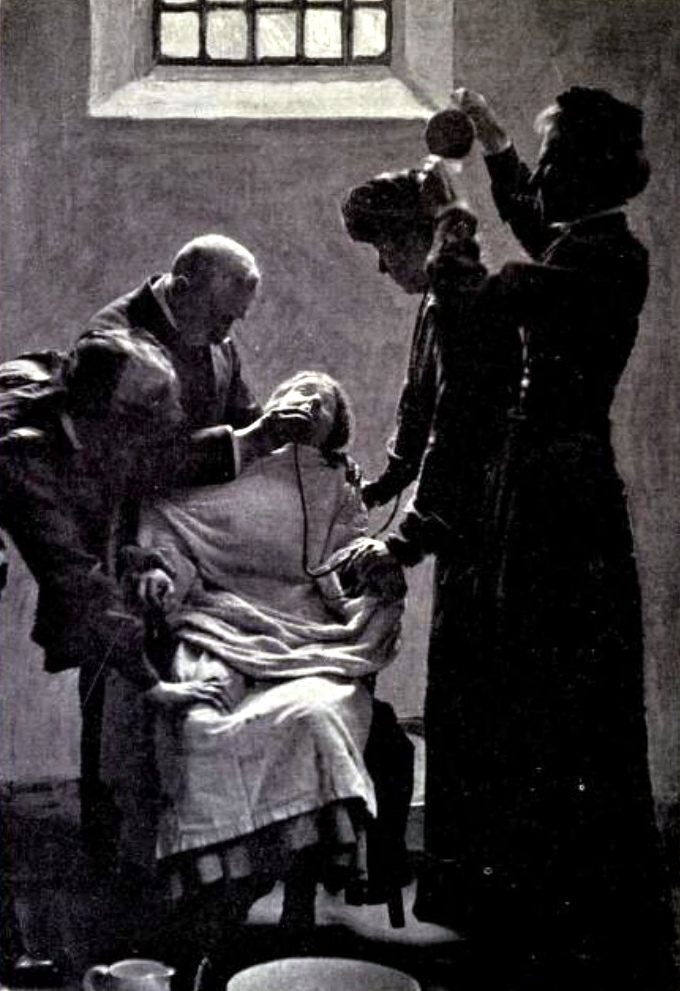
Force feeding used on suffragettes on hunger strike

MacRae was sentenced to two months in Holloway Prison, went on hunger strike and was force-fed.She was awarded the WSPU Hunger Strike Medal 'for Valour.' An image of her medal is on East Grinstead Museum website.

MacRae's signature was one of those along with 67 others who embroidered their signature in prison on a rough cloth known as The Suffragette Handkerchief'. The cloth was smuggled out by Mary Ann Hilliard and is now held in the collection at Priest House, West Hoathly.

By 1914, sisters Georgie (Georgiana) and Helen MacRae had a house, called Comforts Cottage in Edenbridge, Kent. in which they allowed fellow suffragettes to recover and recuperate 'to be restored by quiet and country air'. One of those who benefitted was Gladys Schütze (also known as 'Henrietta Leslie') who had been hurt at Buckingham Palace protest after she was kicked by a police horse. Leslie/Schütze described MacRae as 'gentle and sweet' and whose interests were "darning, embroidering, cooking, bottling, jam-making' whilst Georgie was more of an outdoorsman and Betty interested in local children and country-dancing.

== Legacy ==
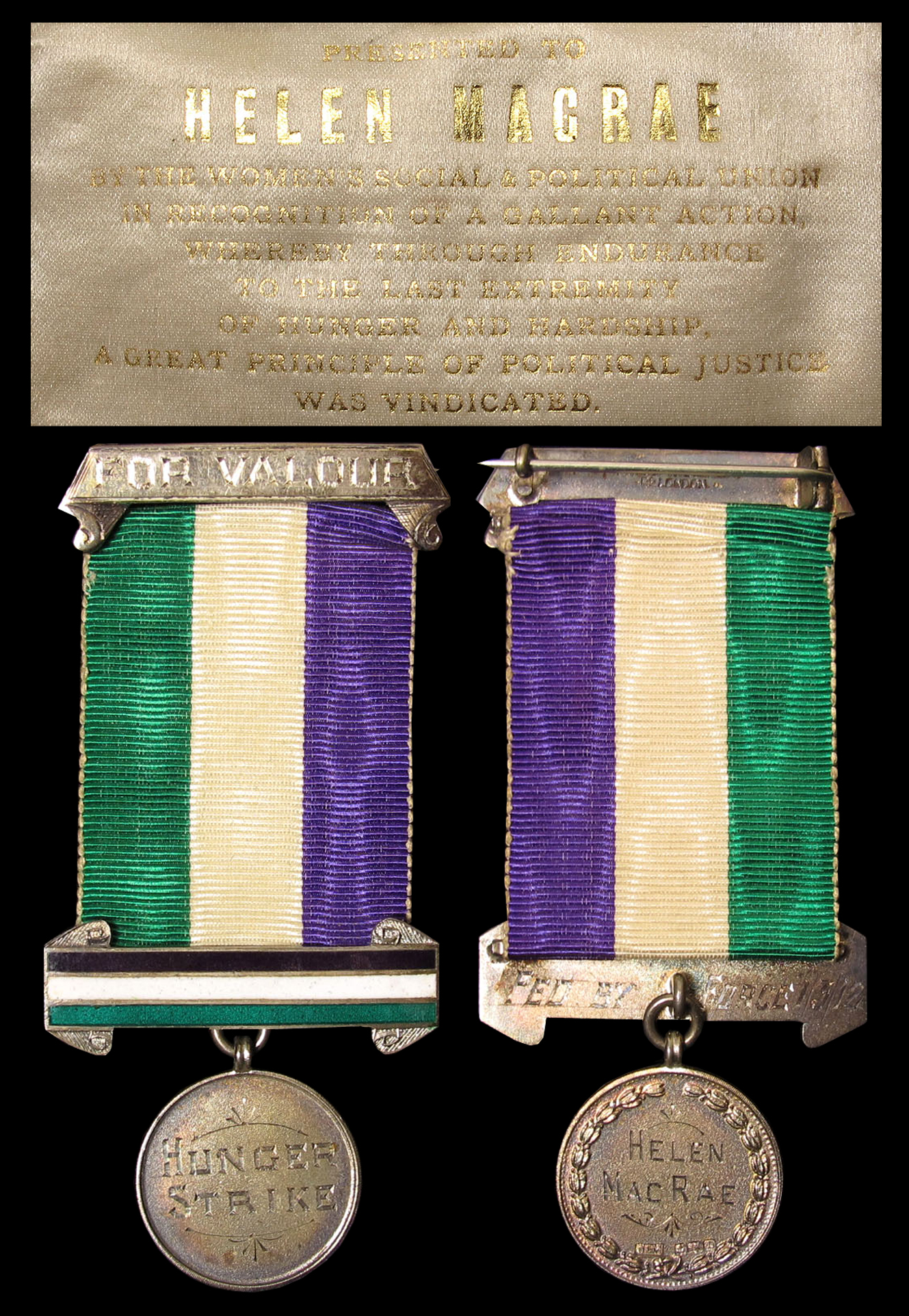

MacRae's WSPU medal, described as 'incredibly rare' was auctioned by Lockdales Auctioneers in 2015, and was sold to academic collector for £12,300. Auction manager, James Sadler said 'these are among the most historically important items we have ever dealt with.'

A collection of MacRae's postcards including image of suffragettes on horse-drawn carriage outside their Clements Inn HQ, and one of Emily Davison, who died under the King's horse at Epsom, and another of Godstone sent by Olive Walton, were also sold.
