= Lowder =

Lowder is a surname. Notable people with the surname include:

- Arthur Lowder, English footballer
- Bobby Lowder, American banking executive
- Charles Lowder (1820–1880), English Anglican priest
- Caroline Lowder Downing (alive in 1912), British suffragette, sister of Edith Downing
- James Lowder, American writer
- John Lowder, English architect and surveyor
- Kyle Lowder, American actor
- Rhett Lowder (born 2002), American baseball player
- Rose Lowder (born 1941), filmmaker
