= Georgina Fanny Cheffins =

English political activist

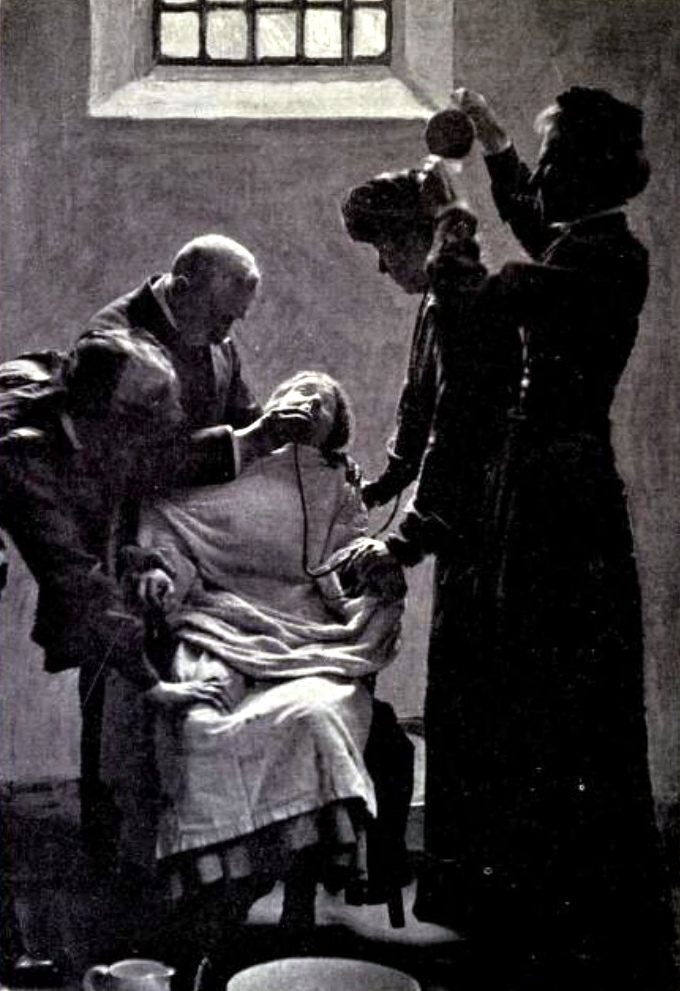
Suffragette being force-fed – Cheffins endured this in 1912

Georgina Fanny Cheffins (1863 – 29 July 1932) was an English militant suffragette who on her imprisonment in 1912 went on hunger strike for which action she received the Hunger Strike Medal from the Women's Social and Political Union (WSPU).

== Biography ==
Cheffins was born in Holborn in Middlesex in 1863, the daughter of Mary Ann née Craven (1837–1891) and Charles Richard Cheffins (1833–1902), a civil engineer and later a manufacturer of Portland cement. In 1891, at age 27, she was listed as living with her recently widowed father at The Grange House in the hamlet of Grange in Kent.

The 1901 Census records her as living with Eva (Evangeline) Lewis (1863–1928) in the St James's Mission in Sedgley in Cheshire; the Census lists them as 'lay sisters'. Lewis was born in Ontario in Canada, the daughter of John Lewis, Bishop of Ontario. Cheffins and Lewis shared a house from some time before 1901 until the death of Lewis in 1928, a Boston marriage in the terminology of the day. The two managed to evade the 1911 census successfully.

Cheffins first became involved in the cause for women's suffrage after passing a WSPU shop in Folkestone after which she went to London to "do her bit of protest." In March 1912 the 49-year-old Cheffins threw a brick through the window of Gorringer's, a department store on Buckingham Palace Road in London. On being arrested she appeared at Bow Street Magistrates' Court on 12 March 1912 before being arraigned at the London Sessions seven days later on 19 March 1912.

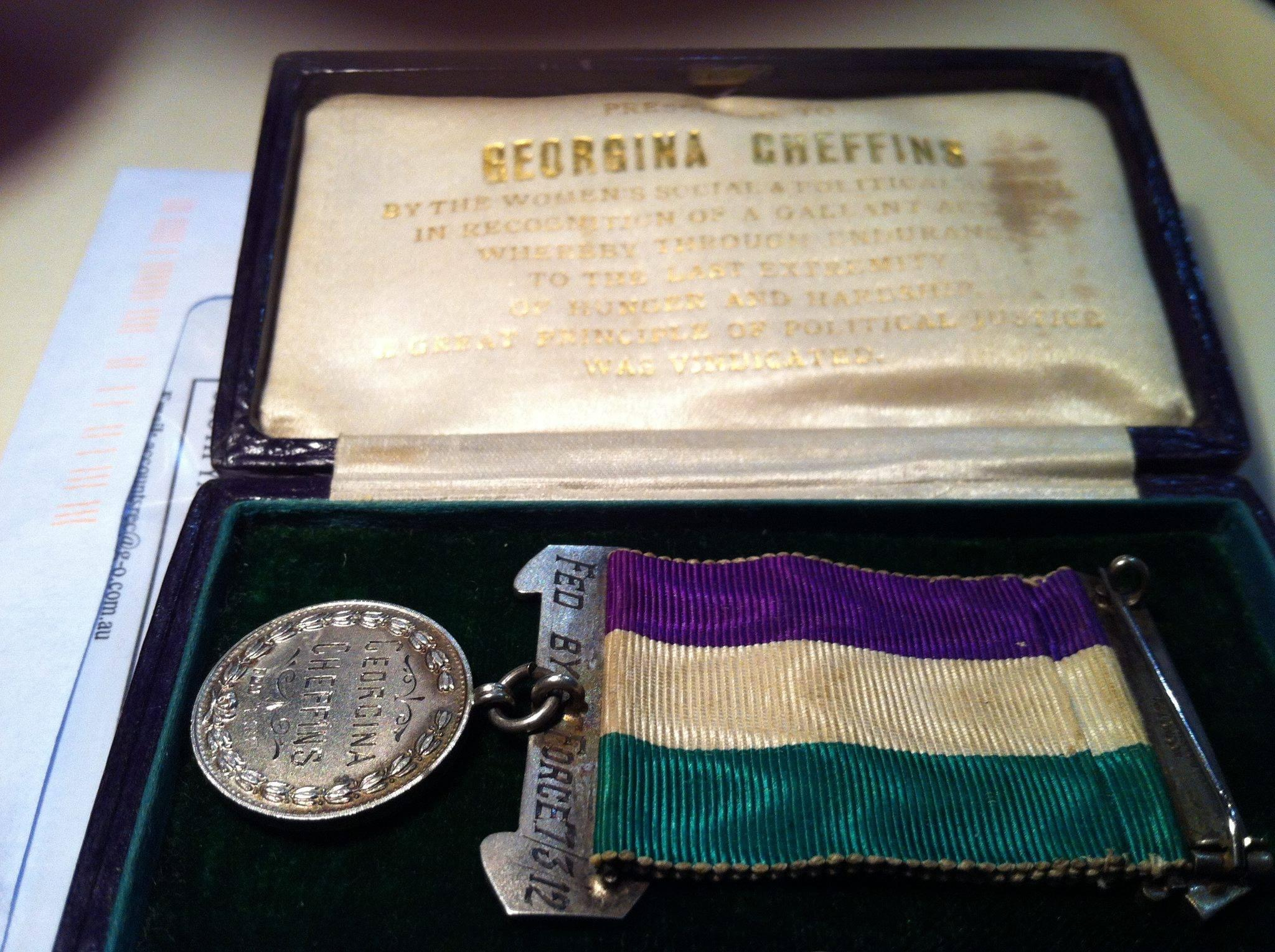
The Hunger Strike Medal awarded to Georgina Cheffins

At her trial Cheffins said that she was a suffragist by conviction, because, after living and working among the very poor for more than twenty years, she had come to the conclusion that all efforts to improve their conditions were futile without the benefit of the franchise. She supported the Women's Social and Political Union because she felt that their militant methods gave the best chance of success. Cheffins was sentenced to four months in Holloway Prison where she went on hunger strike and was forcibly fed. She was one of 68 women who added their signatures or initials to The Suffragette Handkerchief embroidered by prisoners in Holloway Prison in March 1912, and kept until 1950 by Mary Ann Hilliard, and still available to view at the Priest House in West Hoathly. On her release from Holloway Cheffins received the Hunger Strike Medal from the leadership of the Women's Social and Political Union (WSPU).

In her later years Cheffins lived at Bexhill-on-Sea in East Sussex. She died at 25 Leinster Square in Bayswater in 1932. She never married. Her Hunger Strike Medal is in a collection in Melbourne in Australia.
