= Alice Davies =

British suffragette

- Born: 1870
- Died: not known, alive in 1919
- Organisation: Women's Social and Political Union (WSPU)
- Known for: suffragette activism and hunger strike
- Awards: Hunger Strike Medal 'for Valour'

Alice Davies (1870 - alive in 1919) was a British suffragette and nurse. She was imprisoned for protesting for women's right to vote by smashing windows, went on hunger strike and was awarded the Women's Social and Political Union Hunger Strike Medal 'for Valour'.

== Life and activism ==
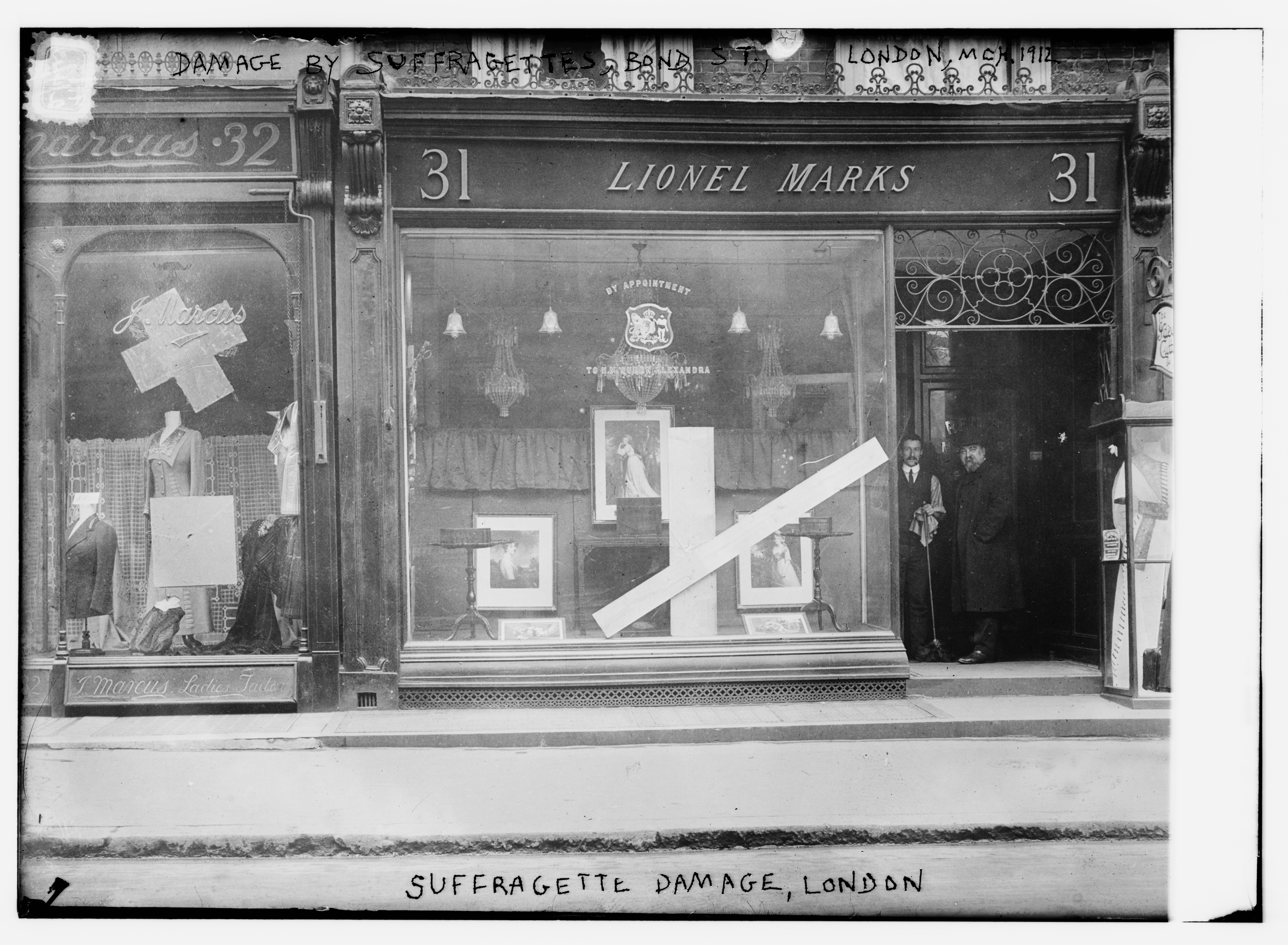
damaged windows Bond Street shops

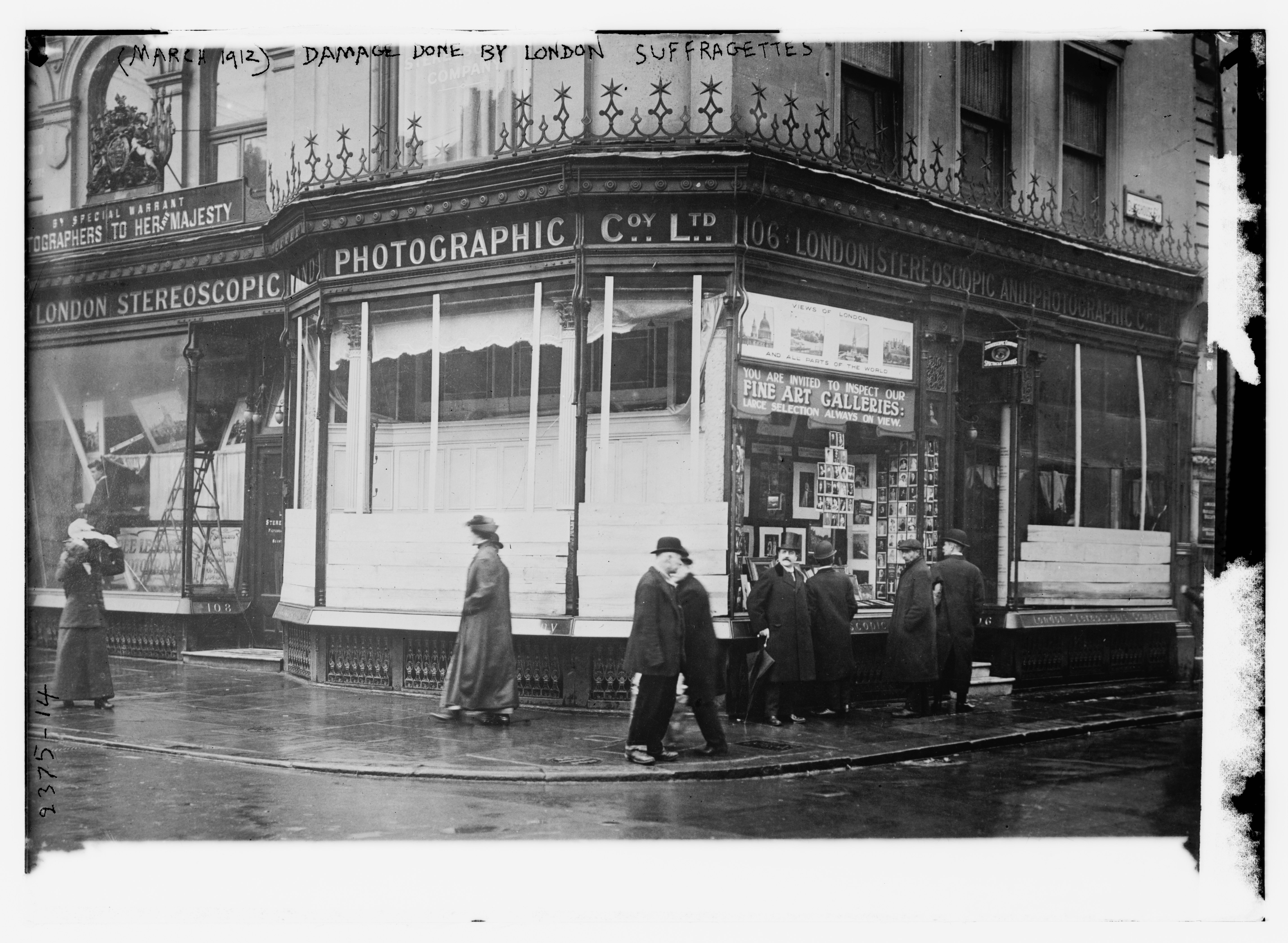
windows damaged by suffragettes

Born in 1870, to parents in Liverpool and had at least one brother, who later had a son Frederick Lesley Stuart Davies, serving in the WWI Army Cycle Corps.

Alice Davies joined the Women's Social and Political Union (WSPU) to protest for women's right to vote. Davies became the Liverpool WPSU Branch organiser from June 1910 to September 1912, trying to move the approach of the four branches in the area to holding more large indoor events and social functions, away from the frequent street meetings outside factories and smaller 'At Homes' in more affluent areas that were a feature before her. The groups in the Cheshire side of the Mersey continued the street events with speakers from Liverpool and beyond, and from November 1910 WSPU had toned down its militancy for a period. The branch shop did not do well during that time with a drop from over £18 annual profit from written material sales to just over19shillings (less than £1) as it became a more exclusive 'members meeting' place. As most of the suffragette literature had been sold at street meetings to spread the message about 'votes for women' to the public, the change in management may reflect lost opportunities to increase support for the cause. Davies organised Holiday Campaigns' in the Lake District, and used Vida Goldstein and Beatrice Harraden, from the national movement to support this. In 1911, Davies was writing to encourage local members to join a deputation to London to attempt to speak to Prime Minister Lloyd-George on 21 November.

During 1912, Davies was one of the two hundred women arrested during a protest which took place on 1 and 4 March 1912, which was a second wave of window smashing protests in the wealthy London shopping area, the West End, in Knightsbridge, Kensington and Chelsea. This took place at the same time as the Parliament was debating a Conciliation Bill (which was to have given some women the right to vote but was not passed).

Davies said at her trial that 'women were determined to fight for the same human rights enjoyed by men. They were tired of being treated as aliens & would continue their struggle until they had reached their objective.'

Davies's sentence was three months and she went on hunger strike. Whilst she was away the Liverpool WSPU continued and members praised Patricia Woodlock as a public speaker, the temporary branch organiser.

In recognition of Davies suffering in prison, the WSPU awarded her a Hunger Strike Medal 'for Valour' designed by Christabel Pankhurst, with the ribbon in the colours of the movement - green, white and purple, representing 'hope, purity and dignity' and dated 4 March 1912.

The presentation box was inscribed

ALICE DAVIES - BY THE WOMEN'S SOCIAL & POLITICAL UNION IN RECOGNITION OF A GALLANT ACTION, WHEREBY THROUGH ENDURANCE TO THE LAST EXTREMITY OF HUNGER AND HARDSHIP, A GREAT PRINCIPLE OF POLITICAL JUSTICE WAS VINDICATED.

National Archive record lists those who were imprisoned and later subject to the pardon granted to all suffragettes when the WSPU discontinued militancy at the start of World War One; she was listed there as Alice 'Davis', but the record states it was created from later recollections of suffragette activists and not from original prison or court documents.

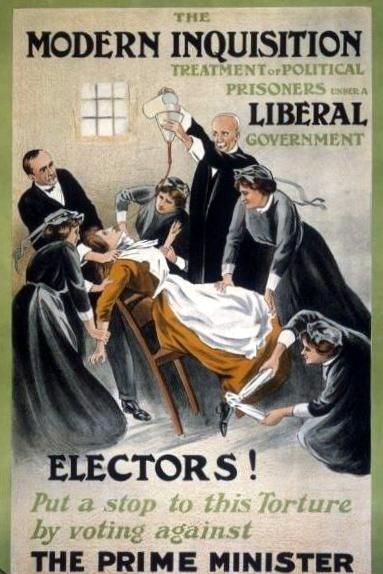
political poster against force-feeding hunger strike women

Women imprisoned who went on hunger strike were frequently force-fed and despite not being treated as 'political prisoners' were supportive of each other, in whatever way they could.

One example of this that Davies took part in Holloway Prison, was the creation by sixty-eight women of what became known as The Suffragette Handkerchief: secretly embroidering their name, initials or full signature on a common piece of cloth, right under the eyes of the prison wardresses (probably in the exercise yard), and smuggled out by Mary Ann Hilliard and now in The Priest House Museum, West Hoathly on display there and with similar items it can also be viewed online.

On return to Liverpool, Davies may have been hesitant for the abilities of her team so organised a campaign meeting at the Sun Hall, Liverpool jointly with two other organisations (NUWSS and the Conservative and Unionist Women's Franchise Association (CUWFA), for the first time, as well as building relations with the local Men's League for Women's Suffrage and the newly developing Church League, but the publicity focussed on the CUWFA role. Davies also organised a visit by Emmeline Pankhurst to the Hardman Hall, which was written up in Votes for Women, February 2012.

Dr. Alice Ker spoke warmly of Davies, during their time in Holloway together, and Davies gave her an appropriate low key release 'welcome' and garden party, rather than the big public events for the release of Patricia Woodlock and others. It appears that Davies moved away from the area after the next summer campaign in the Lake District, to London, She had joined the Women's Tax Resistance League, and had to have two silver candlesticks auctioned to affray unpaid taxes, an event celebrated by a small procession to Grosvenor Gardens and speeches, led by the organisation's founder, Anne Cobden-Sanderson.

== Later life ==
Davies became a Nursing Sister at Westminster, and served in the Queen Alexandra's Imperial Military Nursing Service (during World War One) but does not seem to appear in later key records of the suffragette or the women's rights movements. She wrote to her nephew Frederick Lesley Stuart Davies, a private in the Army Cyclist Corps. King's Liverpool Regiment and Loyal North Lancashire Regiment, who was discharged injured in 1919.

Davies's date of death is unknown.
