= Margaret Macfarlane =

Scottish suffragette in Dundee

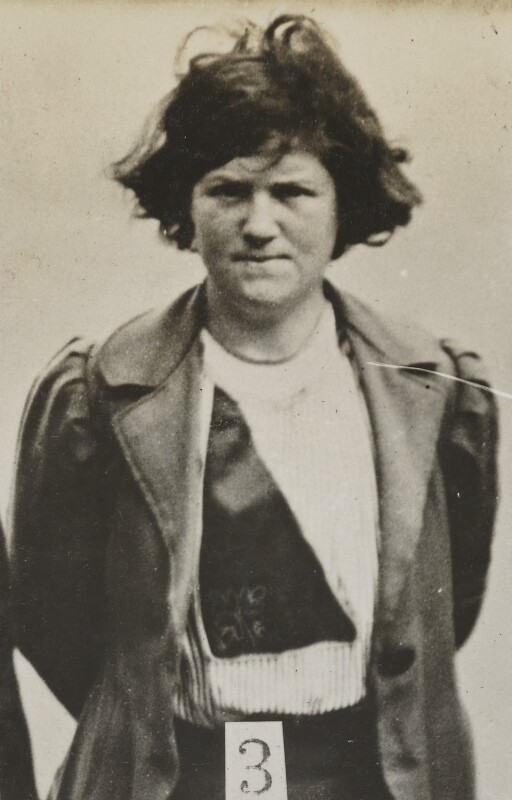
- Margaret Macfarlane in a Home Office surveillance photograph of 1912
- Born: 1888
- Organisation: Women's Social and Political Union
- Known for: Scottish suffragette

Margaret Macfarlane (born 1888) was a Scottish suffragette and honorary secretary of the Women's Social and Political Union in Dundee and East Fife.

== Suffragette activity ==
From at least 1911, Macfarlane, a trained nurse, had started working for the cause of women's suffrage. In 1911, when Emmeline Pankhurst embarked on a speaking tour of Scotland, Macfarlane helped to co-organise a "crowded" public meeting in St Andrews, which was chaired by the secretary of the St Andrews branch of the National Union of Women's Suffrage Societies.

Her increasingly militant advocacy for women's suffrage led to her arrest in London in November 1911, at the age of 23. She was charged with breaking one of the largest windows in London at the office of the Hamburg America Line at Cockspur Street, valued at £104, and sentenced in March 1912 to four months in HM Prison Holloway. She was one of 68 women who added their signatures or initials to The Suffragette Handkerchief embroidered by prisoners in Holloway in March 1912, and kept until 1950 by Mary Ann Hilliard, and still available to view at the Priest House West Hoathly.

Macfarlane refused to eat in prison and was regularly force fed until her release at the end of June 1912. Her weight, she said, dropped from 7st 5lb on her entry to prison to 6st 6lb on her release. She later described her experience of force feeding:

I was lifted into a chair & tied with a strong sheet to the back of the chair. As far as I can remember, my arms were held on each side on the arms of the chair. There was a wardress with a feeding cup & one behind my chair, making a gag for the mouth with her fingers. Another held my knees. I told them that I would not swallow a drop of the gruel voluntarily. When they found that I did not retain any of the food, the one who was gagging me egged the others on to tickle me, to hold my nose to make me swallow, & to grip me on the throat, which to me is the most cruel. The pressing of the throat to make one swallow gives a fearful feeling of suffocation. When they got my feet up, my head was hanging right over the back of the chair, which added to the choking sensation.

Macfarlane continued her political work on her release, appearing in court again in January 1913 on charges of breaking a window of the Home Office and doing damage worth £2. She was ordered to pay the damage and a fine of 40 shillings.
