= Leonora Tyson =

English suffragette

- Born: Leonora Helen Wolff; 13 August 1883; Bradford, Yorkshire, England
- Died: 4 February 1959 (aged 75); East Sheen, London, England
- Known for: Suffragette

Leonora Helen Tyson (née Wolff; 13 August 1883 – 4 February 1959) was an English suffragette and member of the Women's Social and Political Union (WSPU).

== Life ==
Leonora Helen Wolff was born in Bradford, Yorkshire, on 13 August 1883, to Gustav Wolff, a German doctor of music, and Rosa Helen Ashton. She was the fifth of six children. In 1901 the family moved to London. In 1908 while living in Drewstead Road, Streatham, the family changed their name from Wolff to Tyson. It was around this time that Rosa Tyson and her daughters Diana and Leonora became involved in the WSPU. In February 1908 Tyson and her mother were both arrested at the House of Commons while taking part in a protest.

Tyson became very active in the organisation serving as Honorary Secretary of the Streatham branch in 1909 and Secretary of the Lambeth branch in 1910, resuming her role in Streatham in 1911. Tyson spoke at many meetings in Streatham, Lambeth, and further afield. In October 1911 Tyson who was fluent in German represented the WSPU at the Women's Congress in Hamburg, Germany.

In 1911, the Anti-Suffrage Alphabet, authored by Laurence Housman and edited by Tyson, was published in London.

Her suffragette activities led to some time spent in Holloway Prison after being arrested at a protest in central London in March 1912. In April 1912, Tyson went on a hunger strike. She was force-fed by prison authorities after three days of refusing food and water. She was released in May of the same year. Her signature is among those embroidered on The Suffragette Handkerchief in Holloway in March 1912. Tyson was awarded the WPSU Hunger Strike Medal The citation engraved on the bar is 'For Valour' and the inscription on the box would say

"PRESENTED BY THE WOMEN'S SOCIAL AND POLITICAL UNION IN RECOGNITION OF A GALLANT ACTION, WHEREBY THROUGH ENDURANCE TO THE LAST EXTREMITY OF HUNGER AND HARDSHIP A GREAT PRINCIPLE OF POLITICAL JUSTICE WAS VINDICATED."

The medal ribbons were in the WSPU colours of green white and purple. Tyson's medal (box missing) is in the Museum of London.

Tyson died on 4 February 1959, aged 75, at her niece's home in East Sheen.

In 2009, a residential mews in West Dulwich (2 miles from Tyson's home in Streatham), was named after Tyson, entitled Leonora Tyson Mews.
