= Isabella Potbury =

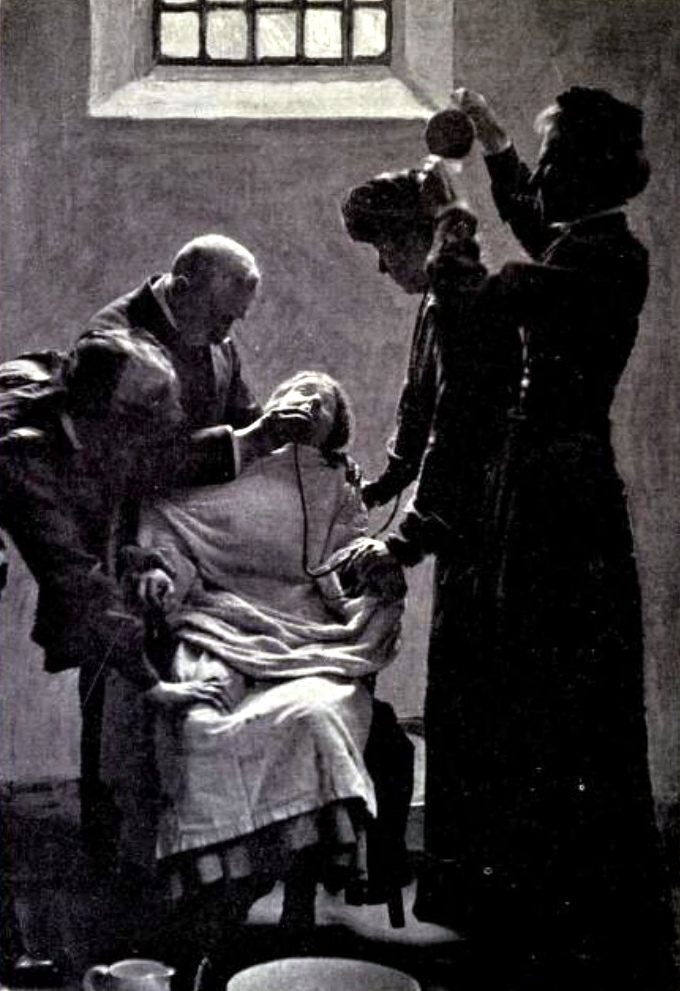
A suffragette being force-fed; Potbury endured this treatment in 1912 in Holloway Prison

Isabella Claude Potbury (1890 – 31 July 1965) was a portrait painter, a member of the Women's Social and Political Union (WSPU) and a militant suffragette who was arrested several times and imprisoned during which she was force-fed. She was awarded the Hunger Strike Medal by the leadership of the WSPU.

Isabella Potbury was born in 1890 in Epsom in Surrey, the daughter of Harriet Alice née Clapham (1862–1942) and Cambridge-educated schoolmaster John Albert Potbury (1859–1903).

She was first arrested on 25 November 1910 following which she appeared at Bow Street Magistrates' Court. She was in the dock there again on 24 November 1911 after a further arrest following which she was imprisoned. Potbury was back in court at the London Sessions on 12 December 1911 and again appeared at Bow Street on 7 March 1912 after breaking ten windows with Olive Wharry and Mollie Ward at Messers Robinson and Cleaver on Regent Street in London valued at £195. A student aged 22, Potbury was sent for trial at the London Sessions on 19 March 1912, receiving a sentence of six months imprisonment in Holloway Prison where she was a co-signatory on The Suffragette Handkerchief in 1912. She was released early at the end of June 1912 after joining the hunger strike and being force-fed. Her final appearance at Bow Street was on 30 June 1914.

In 1929 she married the playwright and actor Charles Nicholas Spencer (1898–1958) at Chelsea in London. The couple lived at 113 Cheyne Walk in Chelsea.

Isabella Claude Spencer died in 1965 at Chelsea in London.
