= Mary Ann Hilliard =

Irish nurse and suffragette (1860–1950)

- Born: 1860; Cork, Ireland
- Died: 1950 (aged 89–90); Wembley, England
- Occupation: Nurse
- Known for: Suffragette and holder of the Suffragette Handkerchief

Mary Ann Hilliard (1860–1950) was an Irish nurse and suffragette. She was arrested for breaking windows in March 1912, and while imprisoned contributed to the Suffragette Handkerchief.

== Biography ==
Mary Ann Hilliard was born in Cork in 1860, to Dominick Hilliard, accountant and Margaret Duke and had two brothers and a sister.

== Early Nursing Career ==
Known as Minnie, she trained as a nurse in England from 1876 at Guys Hospital, London. She later became the sister of the Outpatient Department at Guys Hospital and then sister at the Park Fever Hospital, Hither Green. In 1908 she joined the staff of the Alexandra Hospital for Children with Hip Diseases in Bloomsbury, London and was appointed assistant matron in 1912.

== Suffragette Activities ==
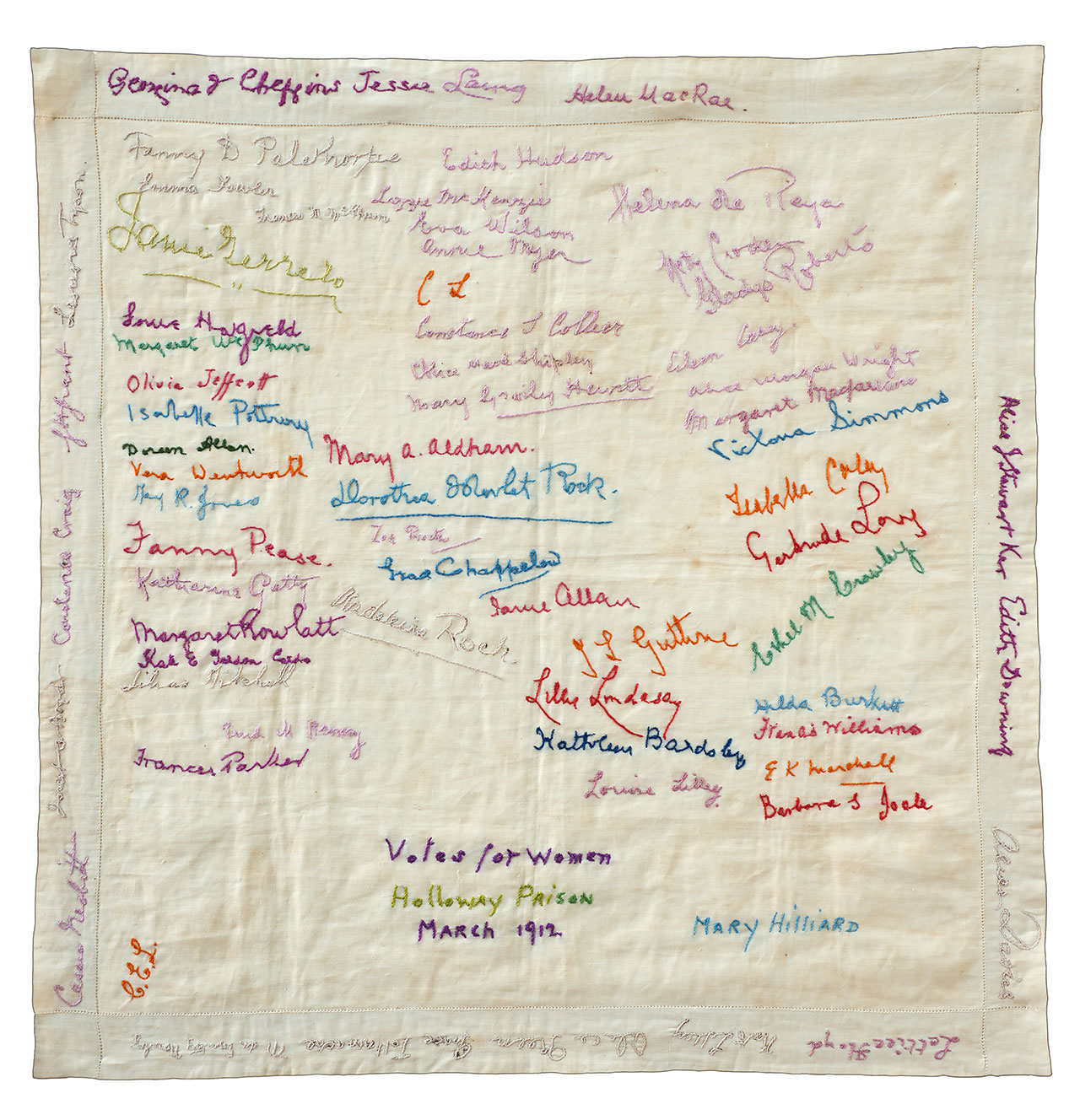
The Suffragette Handkerchief (March 1912)

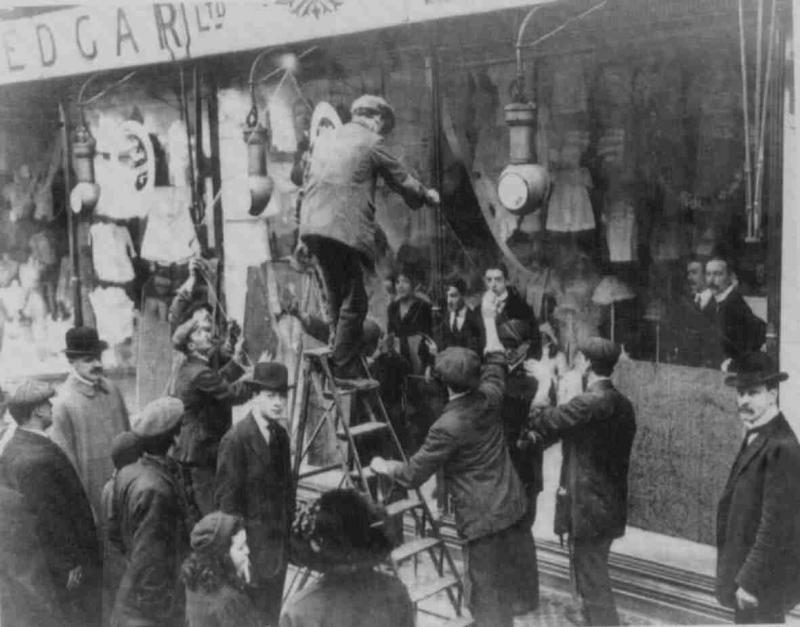
suffragette window smashing campaign

Hilliard was involved in the suffragette window-breaking by around 200 protestors in March 1912, and was arrested and sentenced to two months hard labour.

Hilliard and sixty-seven other Women's Social and Political Union (WSPU) suffragettes who were imprisoned in Holloway Prison embroidered their names on a cloth which became known as The Suffragette Handkerchief. This was a brave act of defiance in a prison where the women were closely watched at all times, and it is thought that Hilliard started it, as she kept the souvenir of her fellow prisoners afterwards.

Signatories include Eileen Mary Casey, Alice Davies, Edith Downing, Katharine Gatty, Margaret Macfarlane, Helen MacRae, Fanny Pease, Alice Maud Shipley, Frances Williams and other leading women from WSPU mass window-smashing protests. Hilliard's own embroidered name is in blue thread on the right of the title 'Votes for Women' (which she may have embroidered), and 'Holloway Prison, March, 1912'.

Although Hilliard may have intended to donate it to the British College of Nurses, according to the British Journal of Nursing in March 1942, she was said to have kept it until she died in 1950.

The location of the item after Hilliard's death is unknown; it resurfaced in the 1960s at a jumble sale.

== Later life ==
Hilliard was a war nurse in World War One with Queen Alexandra's Imperial Military Nursing Service and served at the front in Italy, nursing prisoners. Her health deteriorated in the 1920s and she retired from nursing to live in Wembley, London.

She died in 1950. Her funeral was at Park Lane Methodist Church and cremation at Golders Green.
