= Henrietta Leslie =

British suffragette, writer and pacifist (1884–1946)

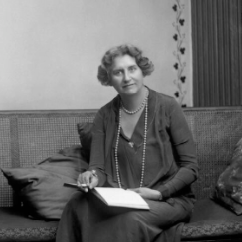
- in 1933 (by Bassano Ltd)
- Born: (Gladys) Henrietta Raphael; 6 July 1884; London, England
- Died: 19 July 1946 (aged 62); Bern, Switzerland
- Other names: Gladys Henrietta Mendl and Gladys Henrietta Schütze
- Education: governesses
- Occupation: writer
- Employer: Daily Herald (1919-1923)
- Known for: writing
- Spouses: Louis Mendl; Harrie Leslie Hugo Schütze

Henrietta Leslie was born (Gladys) Henrietta Raphael she became Gladys Henrietta Mendl and Gladys Henrietta Schütze (6 July 1884 – 19 July 1946) was a British suffragette, writer and pacifist.

== Early life ==
Schutze was born in London, England, in 1884 into an assimilated Jewish family. Her father, Arthur Lewis Raphael, was an addicted gambler and he died when she was a child. Her father had been excluded from the lucrative family business, but after his death the larger family cared for her and her widowed mother Marianna Floretta (born Moses ).

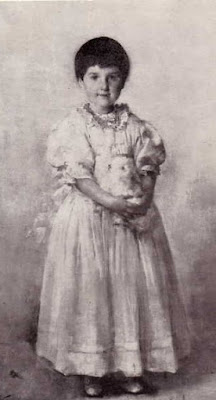
Gladys in 1895 by Solomon J Solomon

Her mother went on to be the painter, Mary F Raphael who trained in London and Paris. Gladys was largely left her to the care of governesses. While she has a child she had an injury to her hip which troubled her throughout her life. She also established that she was a pacifist and that she did not want to follow the Jewish faith.

== Adult life ==
In 1902 she made a disastrous marriage to a corn merchant named Louis Mendl. Her husband was related to her by marriage before the wedding. She found out that she was innocent of the domestic and sexual expectations of a wife. In 1906 she was helping the Liberal's election campaign when she found out about the Women's Social and Political Union. Schutze was a pacifist with a dislike of violence and a suffragette.

By 1910 her marriage was over and she became a published writer when The Roundabout and The Straight Road were published in the following year.

In 1913 she married again to Harrie Leslie Hugo Schütze. He was a bacteriologist and a fellow supporter of women's suffrage. She did not like demonstrations but she obliged herself to go. She was nearly arrested but her husband rescued her. They were close to Emmeline Pankhurst who once addressed a crowd from the balcony of their house while the police hovered below and they looked after her twenty strong entourage. She would carry consealed messages for the suffragettes.

She was one of those who needed care after she had been hurt at a Buckingham Palace protest when she was kicked by a police horse. The injury revived the childhood damage to her hip. She was taken to sisters Georgie (Georgiana) and Helen MacRae's "Comforts Cottage" in Edenbridge, Kent where they allowed fellow suffragettes to recover and recuperate.

In 1914 the first world war started and she left the WSPU as the Pankhursts had abandoned the suffragette campaign and committed its members to support the war. Schutze founded a breakaway organisation known as the Suffragettes of the WSPU. Schutze suffered a lot of discrimination because of her pacifism and her German name. From 1916 she used the name Henrietta Leslie when publishing new works.

Her three plays, twenty novels included Mrs. Fischer's War which was published in 1931. The story is based on her own experiences during the first war when she was treated unkindly because of her heritage and beliefs. As the second world war approached she returned from the USA to take in Jewish refugees. Schutze died in Bern, Switzerland, in 1946 three weeks before her husband. Henrietta Lesile used the pseudonym when she was writing as such Henrietta Leslie was not her real name.
