= Katharine Gatty =

British nurse, journalist and suffragette (1870–1952)

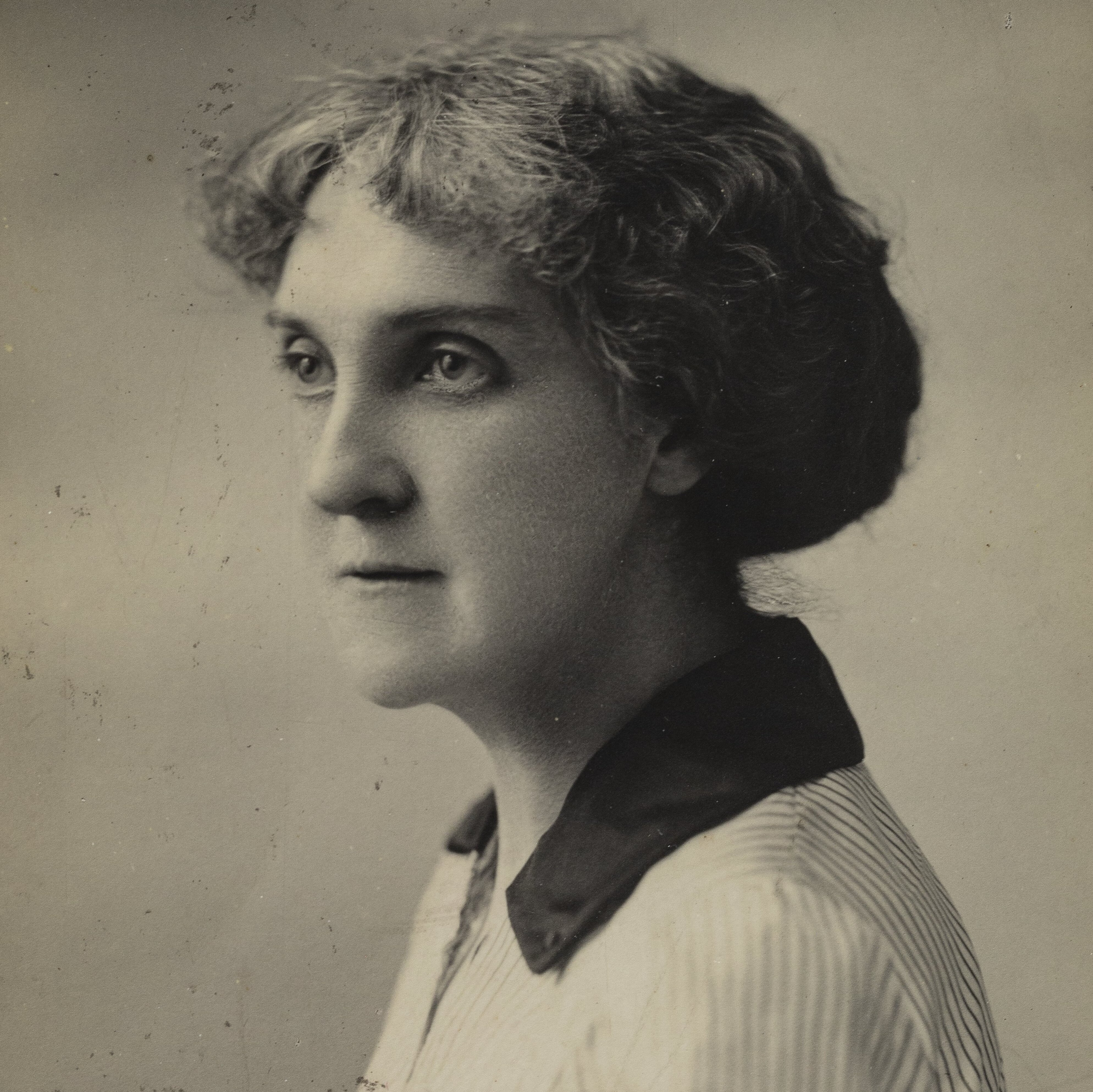
- Born: June 11, 1870; Firozpur
- Died: 1952 (aged 81–82); Sydney
- Occupations: British nurse, journalist, lecturer, suffragette
- Employer: Women's Tax Resistance League in 1911
- Spouse(s): William Lewis Reid, Ernest Lucas Gillett
- Partner: John Manson

Katharine Gatty later Katherine Gillett-Gatty (11 June 1870 – 1 May 1952) was a British nurse, journalist, lecturer and militant suffragette. As a prominent member of the Women's Social and Political Union after going on a hunger strike in prison during which she was force-fed. In her later years she resided in California in the United States before emigrating to Australia, where she spent her last years.

== Early years ==
Of Irish descent through her mother, Emma Katharine Gatty was born in Ferozopur in Bengal in India in 1870 to Emma Rebecca née Collum (1844-1929) and Captain Edward Gatty (1837-1872) of the 39th (Dorsetshire) Regiment of Foot. By 1881 she and her widowed mother were living in Hammersmith in London. Her career as a Liberal started at age 18, when she took part in the Great Dock Strike of 1889.

In 1908 Gatty was a delegate to the International Congress of Women in Amsterdam.

== Activism ==
After joining the Ealing branch of the Women's Social and Political Union Gatty became a militant suffragette, on one occasion chaining herself to the gates at Hyde Park. In the suffragette publication Votes For Women Gatty was described as a journalist and lecturer. She was first imprisoned in Holloway Prison in 1909 for one month. In 1911 she was a salaried member of the Women's Tax Resistance League in London. In November 1911 Gatty was sentenced to three weeks imprisonment in Holloway Prison after taking part in a campaign of window smashing after the government 'torpedoed' the anticipated Conciliation Bill which was seen as a progressive step towards achieving women's suffrage. In Holloway she went on hunger strike for which action she received a Hunger Strike Medal from the leadership of the WSPU.

In January 1912 she was again arrested while causing a disturbance when women had been excluded from the trial of Emily Davison, but this time she was released without charge. Gatty was a close friend of fellow-suffragette Davison (in May 1913 Gatty invited Davison for tea) who was killed when she ran in front of the horse of King Edward VII at the 1913 Derby.

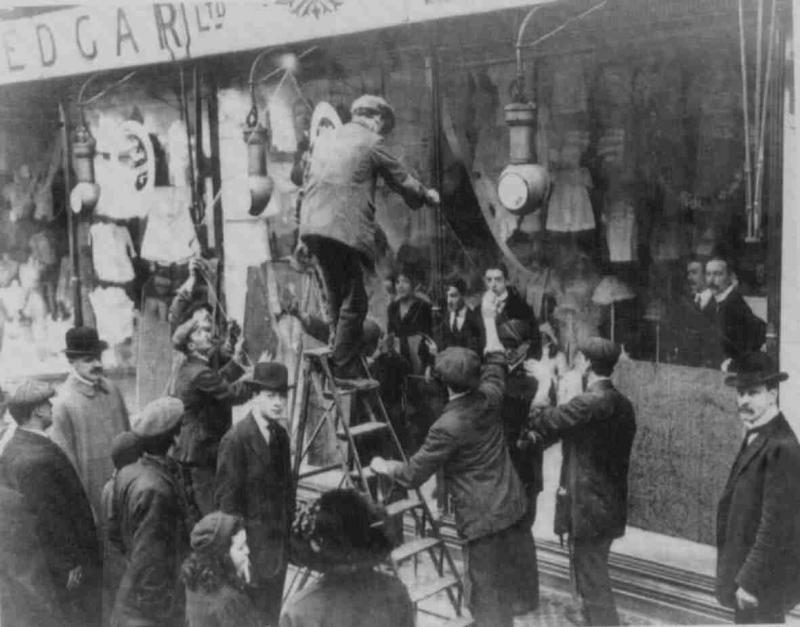
suffragette window smashing campaign

In March 1912 Gatty took part in a further campaign of window smashing in March 1912 on behalf of the WSPU for which she was sentenced to six months imprisonment for smashing glass valued at £42. At her trial she said that men were allowed to break women’s hearts and homes without punishment and contrasted her sixth month sentence for minor property damage to the two month sentence an Edinburgh man received for breaking his wife’s skull. In her opinion, property was worth more in the eyes of the law than a person. Her signature was among those embroidered on The Suffragette Handkerchief in Holloway Prison, which was kept afterwards by fellow prisoner Mary Ann Hilliard. In prison in April 1912 Gatty again went on hunger strike which "lasted from dinner time on Sat. 13 till breakfast time on Friday 19 inclusive (6 days). Doctors began F.f. on the Wed. and they tried to feed me on Thursday 3 times but failed." In June of the same year she again went on hunger strike and was force-fed 13 times. On her release from prison in August 1911 she was immediately rearrested for smashing a window at the post office in Abergavenny in Wales, stating that she had done so to protest against the exclusion of women from such official lists as the electoral register. On this occasion Gatty received one month in prison with hard labour which had a serious effect on her health. In the latter stages of 1912 Gatty became Secretary to the Suffrage Atelier (SA), an organisation of suffrage artists in London who created and printed postcards, posters and banners for the women's suffrage movement.

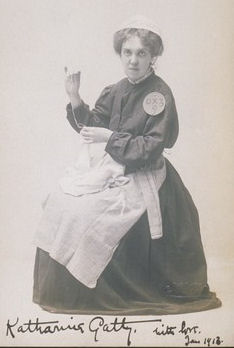
Katharine Gatty photographed in her prison uniform in January 1913

By 1913 Gatty was an organiser for the National Amalgamated Union of Shop Assistants, Warehousemen and Clerks while in her later years she had links to the Communist Party, regularly corresponding with the journalist and activist Anna Louise Strong. In total she was imprisoned nine times for her activities on behalf of women's suffrage and the movement to abolish capital punishment. Gatty was an active member of the International Coordination Committee for Aid to Republican Spain, and was one of the organisers of the Co-operative Party in England in addition to being a lifelong advocate of Irish Home Rule. Gatty trained as a nurse in the early 1920s, qualifying in 1924. It was at this time she began a correspondence with the activist for socialism and sexual revolution Hildegart Rodríguez Carballeira. Gatty was still on the Nursing Register in 1934.

In January 1893 in St Mary’s church in Islington she married William Lewis Reid (1858–1923) of the Reid & Sons family of silversmiths. Their daughter Eve Lewis Reid was born in December 1893. In 1911 Reid divorced her following her adultery with a John Manson between 1897 and 1910. She and Manson lived together as husband and wife and Reid alleged she had given birth to Manson's child in 1898. In 1915 she married Ernest Lucas Gillett (1882-1954), a clerk in the Civil Service. The couple adopted the surname Gillett-Gatty.

== Later life ==
In September 1934 Gatty, representing Action Feministe Internationale, attended a conference on 'Ethiopia and Justice' organised by Sylvia Pankhurst at the Central Hall, Westminster. In the mid-1930s she lived for a period in Greece. In 1937 Gatty, describing herself an author "writing a book" and a widow despite the fact her husband was still alive, moved to California to the United States, residing there during the 1940s. In 1938 the "humorous, witty Irishwoman, Mrs. Gillett-Gatty" spoke at a meeting of the American Student Union at Stanford University in California on "Fascism in Italy and Its Threat to the Democratic Ideal" in which she related her own experiences in Italy before and after Mussolini's rise to power.

Emma Katharine Gillett-Gatty emigrated to Strathfield in New South Wales Australia in 1947, and here she died in 1952 aged 81. In her will she donated her eyes to two blind people, in it stating: "About my own carcase, first, that both my eyes be enucleated if possible within eight hours of my demise, so that corneally blind persons may each receive one. Next, I be cremated or buried at sea."

The Archive of the Women's Library at the London School of Economics holds twelve of her letters sent from prison.
