= Eileen Mary Casey =

- Born: Eileen Mary Casey; 4 April 1881; Deniliquin, New South Wales, Australia
- Died: 12 October 1972 (aged 91); Lee-on-the-Solent, Hampshire, England
- Occupations: Educator and suffragette

Eileen Mary Casey (4 April 1881 – 12 October 1972) was a suffragette, translator and teacher.

== Early life ==
She was born on 4 April 1881 in Deniliquin, New South Wales, Australia. Casey was the first born of Dr. Phillip Forth Casey and Isabella Julia Agnes Raey. In April 1882 her father moved her family to Hay, New South Wales. In March 1890 her father’s job moved the family back to Europe where they settled in Göttingen, Germany. Eileen became fluent in German.

== Work as a suffragette ==
Casey was inspired by Emmeline Pankhurst, who she saw at a rally. After this, she became a member of the Women’s Social and Political Union, and was considered super-militant. In 1911, Casey was one of those involved in WSPU’s Window Smashing Raid in London. She escaped being arrested while over 213 fellow suffragettes were arrested.

WSPU told the suffragettes who smashed the windows that they should not destroy the businesses in Queensland and Victoria because women did have the right to vote in Australia. The following year, alongside her mother and fellow suffragette, Olive Walton, she participated in another raid.

== Imprisonments ==
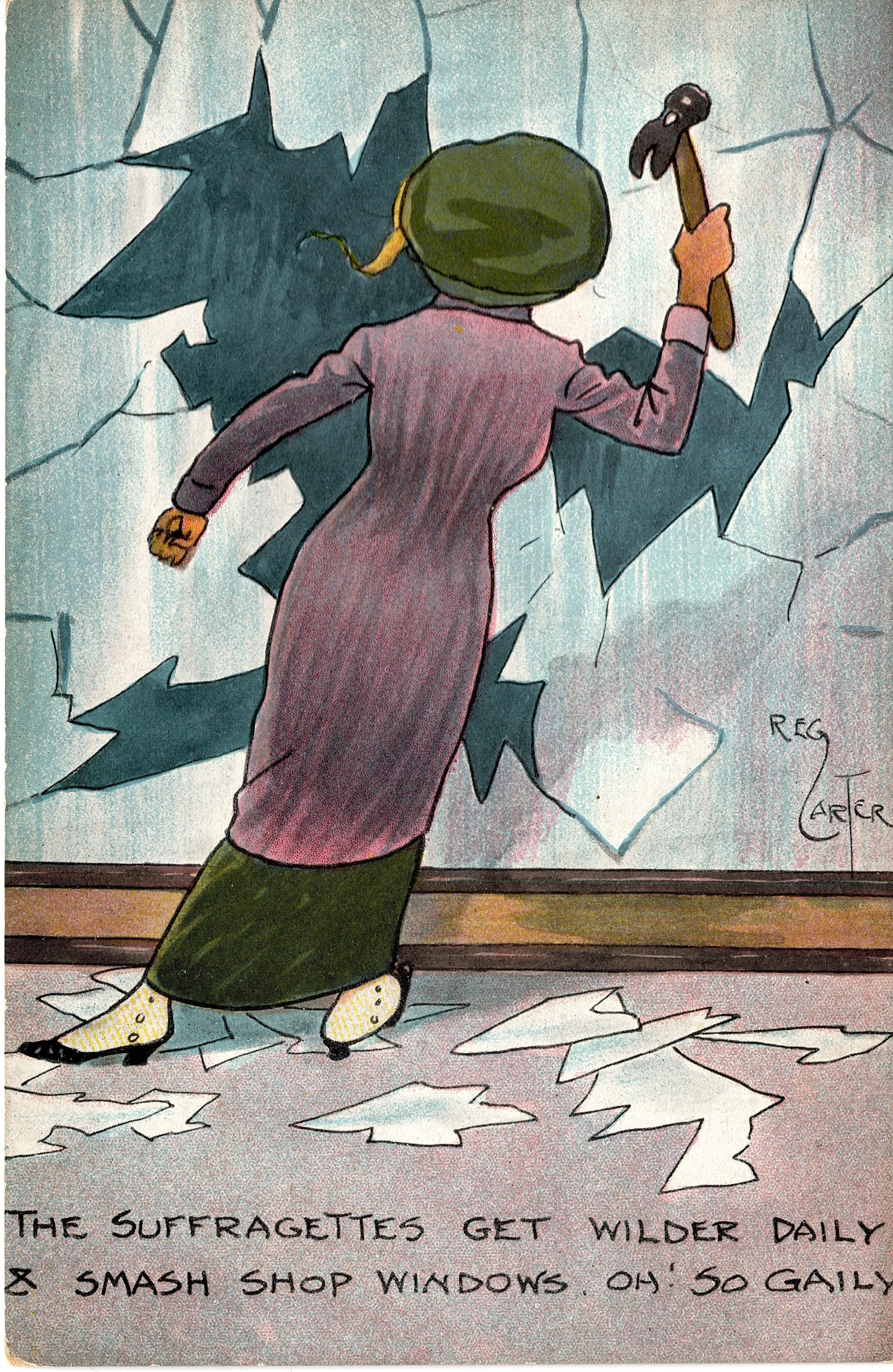
Poster of suffragette window smashing

In March 1912, she was imprisoned in Holloway for four months for “damage,” the smashing the windows of Marshall and Snelgrove’s shop in Oxford Street. In prison, she participated in a hunger strike, was force-fed, and, along with Mary Ann Hilliard and others, secretly embroidered her name on The Suffragette Handkerchief right under the wardress's noses. Casey was awarded a Women's Social and Political Union (WSPU) Hunger Strike Medal for her imprisonment on 4 March 1912, a date when many women were arrested for a militant campaign of window-breaking. The citation engraved on the bar is 'For Valour,' and the inscription says

"PRESENTED BY THE WOMEN'S SOCIAL AND POLITICAL UNION IN RECOGNITION OF A GALLANT ACTION, WHEREBY THROUGH ENDURANCE TO THE LAST EXTREMITY OF HUNGER AND HARDSHIP A GREAT PRINCIPLE OF POLITICAL JUSTICE WAS VINDICATED."

The medal ribbons were in the WSPU colours of green white and purple.

On 17 March 1913, Casey was arrested under the name “Eleanor Cleary” for “placing noxious substance in a Pillar-box work”. She was released after she paid a fine. In June 1913, Casey and her daughter Bella were supportive of Kitty Marion's notion that setting fire to the grandstand at a racecourse at Hurst Park, Hampton Court would be (in reference to Emily Davison's act of throwing herself under the King's horse at Epsom races), a 'most appropriate beacon, not only as the usual protest, but in honour of our Comrade's daring deed'. In October 1913, she was arrested under the name “Irene Casey” in Bradford, was sentenced to three months, and went on a hunger strike. She was released under the “Cat and Mouse” Act. She escaped by dressing in men’s attire while her mother, Isabella, dressed as Eileen. She was out for eight months when she was arrested in June 1914 in Nottingham for possession of explosives. She was sentenced to 15 months.

== Teaching career ==
It was during World War I that Eileen Casey became a landgirl and gardener at Kew Gardens. From 1923 to 1940, she moved to Japan to teach English. When World War II broke out she moved to Australia where she became a translator for the Board of Censors. She became the master of an Emulation Lodge. Casey moved back to England in 1951. In 1956, she became a member of Calling All Women. When she moved to Australia in 1968 she participated in the Australian branch of the Suffragette Fellowship and Liberal Catholic Church in England.

Casey died on 12 October 1972 in Lee-on-the-Solent, Hampshire, England.
