= Mary F. Raphael =

British Pre-Raphaelite painter and writer

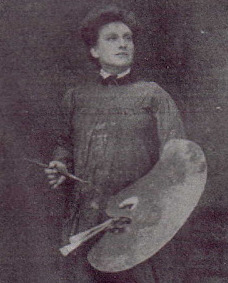
- Born: Marianna Florette Moses; 11 July 1861
- Died: 1942 (aged 80–81); Switzerland
- Education: London and Paris
- Occupations: Painter and writer

Marianna Florette Raphael, born Marianna Florette Moses (11 July 1861 – 1942), was a British Pre-Raphaelite painter and writer. She painted and wrote under the name Mary F. Raphael.

== Life ==
She was born in 1861. She married Arthur Lewis Raphael, but he was an addicted gambler and he died. He had been already excluded from the lucrative family business, but after his death, the larger family cared for his daughter, Gladys, and his widow Marianna.

Raphael abandoned her daughter Gladys into the care of governesses as she proceeded to train herself to be an artist. One of her tutors was Solomon J. Solomon, and he exhibited a painting in 1895 of Gladys. Raphael trained in London and Paris and her 1896 nude Wood Nymph was exhibited at the Royal Academy. Her painting of the writer A. E. W. Mason became a frontispiece of one of his books.

In 1902 her painting of The Winter's Tale characters Florizel and Perdita was exhibited at the Royal Academy.

In 1906 she was exhibiting at the Royal Academy of Arts where one critic commented on the similarity of that year's paintings to the work of other artists. The critic felt that her work was similar to that of the American painter George Hitchcock.

In 1917 she published As Chance Would Have It. Raphael's 1923 book The Lure of the Loire had twenty illustrations, and in 1926 she published The Romance of English Almshouses. The book was illustrated by 26 photographs and over twenty of Raphael's own drawings.

Raphael died in Switzerland, three weeks before her husband.

== Sample artwork ==
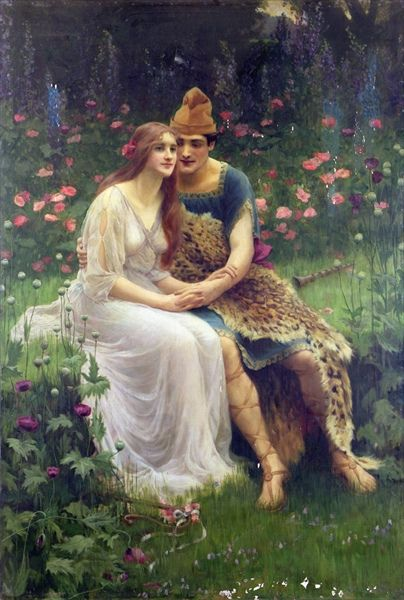
Florizel and Perdita

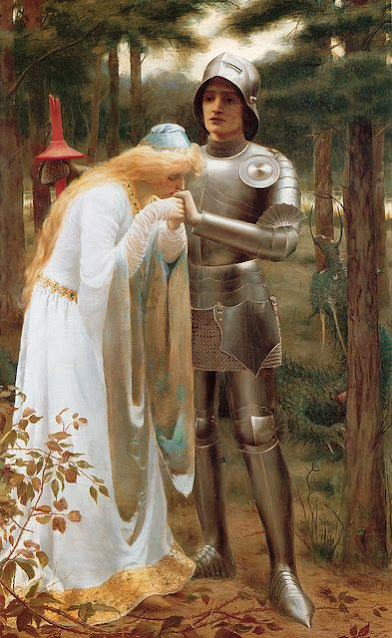
Britomart and Amoret

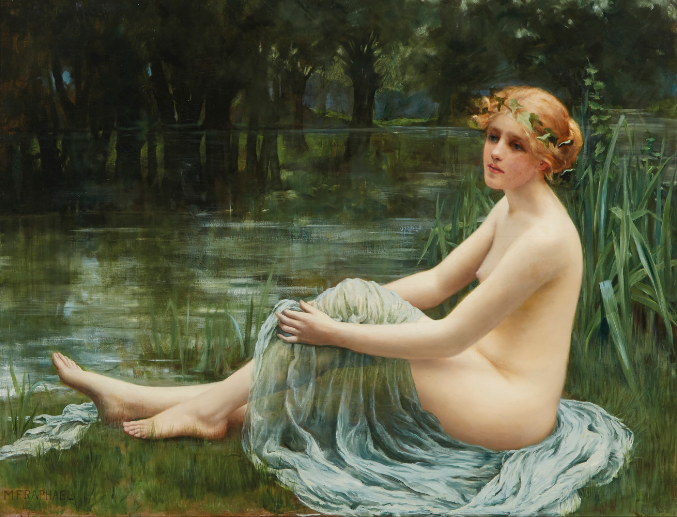
The Wood Nymph

== Bibliography ==
- Raphael, Mary F. (1914). Phœbe Maroon. London.
- Raphael, Mary F. (1917). As chance would have it. London.
- Raphael, Mary F. (1923). The Lure of the Loire. Mills & Boon.
- Raphael, Mary F. (1926). The Romance of English Almshouses. Mills & Boon.
- Raphael, Mary F. (1938). Sea Gulls and Other Verses. A. Moring, Limited, The De La More Press.
- Raphael, Mary F. (1940). Melisande, and Other Verses. A. Moring, Limited.
