= Caroline Lowder Downing =

Welsh suffragette (1855–1942)

Carolin Lowder Downing
- Born: 1855; Cardiff, Glamorgan, Wales
- Died: 2 November 1942 (aged 87); Flintshire, Wales
- Years active: 1908–1912
- Organisation: Women's Social and Political Union (WSPU)
- Known for: suffragette activism, hunger strike
- Relatives: Edith Downing (sister)
- Honours: Hunger Strike Medal for Valour

Caroline Lowder Downing (1855 – 2 November 1942) was a Welsh suffragette who in 1912 was imprisoned and awarded a Women's Social and Political Union Hunger Strike Medal "for Valour". She was a sister of the artist and suffragette Edith Downing.

== Life and activism ==
Downing was born in 1855 in Wales to a coal merchant and shipping agent, Edward Coenty Downing, and Mary Anne Sarah Lowder. She was one of four siblings, Caroline Lowder Downing trained as a nurse, and in 1908 joined the Women's Social and Political Union (WSPU) Chelsea Branch, with her sister Edith Elizabeth Downing, an artist. They both became militant suffragettes.

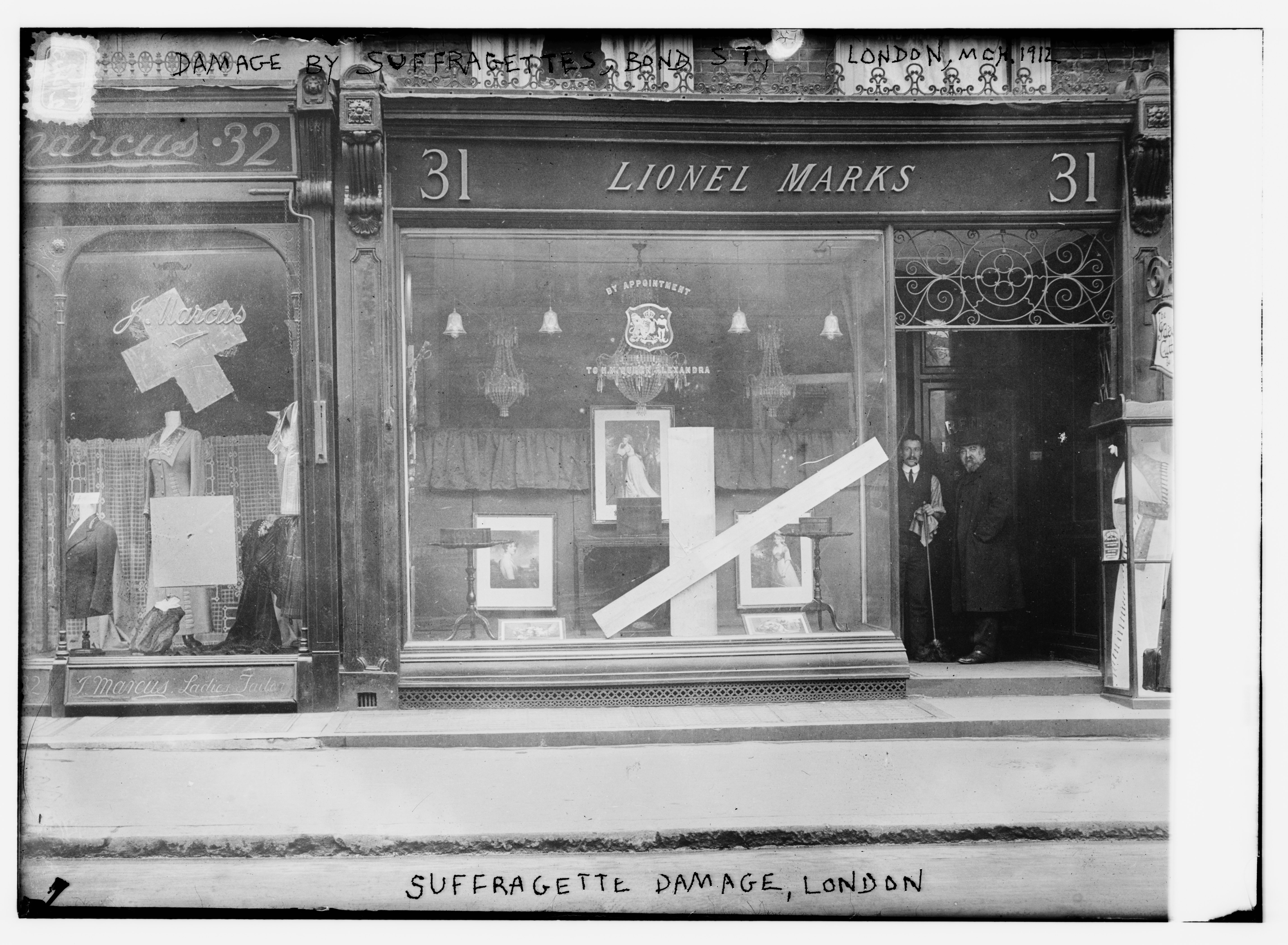
Window damaged by suffragettes, March 1912

Downing took part in the window smashing on 1 March 1912, causing £50 of damage. She was imprisoned in Winson Green Prison, Birmingham, where she went on hunger strike and was force-fed. Describing experiences of fellow sufferers of that painful treatment, Downing's activism and its resultant convictions were also duly reported in the WSPU newspaper Votes for Women, for example:

On 28 November 1911:

'Miss Caroline Downing was charged with trying to break through the police cordon at Palace Yard. She said that it was a purely political action, in face of Mr. Asquith’s broken pledge and the insult he put upon women by bringing in a Manhood Suffrage Bill in response to women’s demand. She said next time she would do worse. Magistrate: “I hope not.” (Fined 10s., or 7 days)’.

On 7 March 1912:

'On Thursday afternoon Miss Caroline Downing was recalled and charged with breaking windows value £50 at 221, Regent Street. She said it was part of a political protest for a purely political motive for gaining votes for women; this violence was as repellant to them as to the Government, but they were compelled to take these methods. As soon as the vote was granted this violence would cease automatically. She was committed to take her trial on the 20th, refusing bail.’

On 5 July 1912: under the heading ‘Forcible Feeding – A Danger And An Outrage’

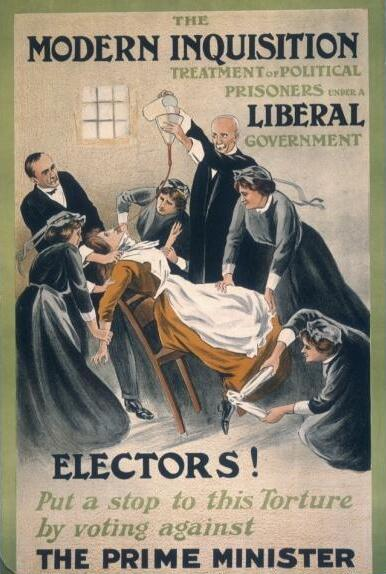
Poster against suffragette prisoners being force fed

'Caroline Downing entered the debate with the following statement: ‘I should like definitely to deny the statement that has been made in the House of Commons and elsewhere that forcible feeding by tube is only painful when the victim struggles. Mrs. Bowen, with whom I was in constant companionship during the whole of the time (both hunger strikes), suffered greatly both from the pain in the nostrils and throat and in the stomach, though she was quite passive. Miss Farmer, another passive victim (splendidly brave), also suffered a very great deal. The underground cells are dreadfully cold and damp, so cold that I have scarcely ever been really warm all these months. I have worn winter things and furs and shawl up to Saturday, and till the last ten days have had broken chilblains on my hands. Mrs. Bowen and I could not sleep from cold and aching limbs and back. Water spilt on the stone floor did not dry for hours, though wiped up. Mildew is on the walls of my cell. To sleep on a plank bed four inches from such a floor is to court disease. For the last sixteen days we were given proper bedsteads in response to our complaints.’

Downing was awarded a Hunger Strike Medal, dated 1 March 1912, 'for Valour', which was exhibited in the 'Women's Place in Parliament Exhibition at the Palace of Westminster during the centenary year after (some) women were given the right to vote in British elections. An image of the medal was released on social media on 15 October 2015 and 5 February 2018. The dedication on the inside of the original presentation box said:

'Presented to Caroline Lowder Downing by the Women’s Social and Political Union in recognition of a gallant action, whereby through endurance to the last extremity of hunger and hardship, a great principle of political justice was vindicated.'

Caroline Lowder Downing's Hunger Strike Medal is held in the UK Parliamentary Art Collection (WOA S748).

Caroline Downing stood for election in 1907 as a Lewisham Poor Law Guardian for the Forest Hill Ward as a Progressive Candidate. In total there appear to have been 10 women candidates standing for election (for different political groups) to the Guardians, of whom two (not including Caroline) were elected.
