= Olive Grace Walton =

British suffragette (1886–1937)

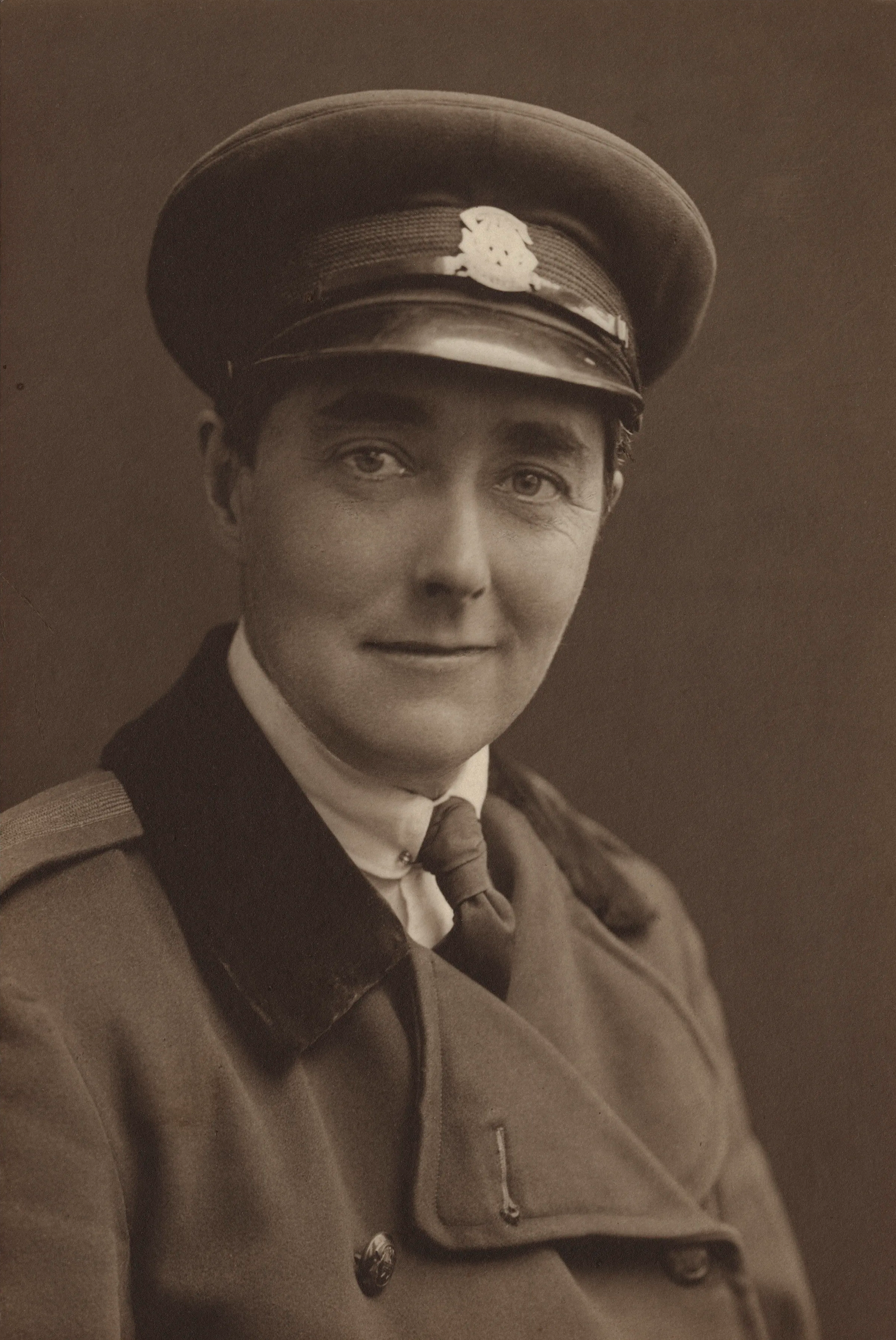
- Olive Grace Walton by Olive Edis, c. 1920
- Born: 1886; Tunbridge Wells, Kent, England
- Died: 1937 (aged 50–51)
- Occupation: Suffragist

Olive Grace Walton (1886–1937) was a British Suffragette who was arrested three times, imprisoned twice, and force-fed in prison after going on a hunger strike.

== Life ==
Walton was born in 1886 in Tunbridge Wells. Her father was in his seventies when she was born, and had been a wine merchant. She had one brother and sister and felt herself intellectually inferior as she had only learned cookery and art. She was sent to London to do social work by her parents.

Walton first joined the National Union of Women's Suffrage Societies around 1908. She became honorary secretary of the militant Women's Social and Political Union there. Walton was arrested on 21 November 1911 for her participation in the protest against a proposed franchise bill that would continue to exclude women. She served one week in Holloway Prison.

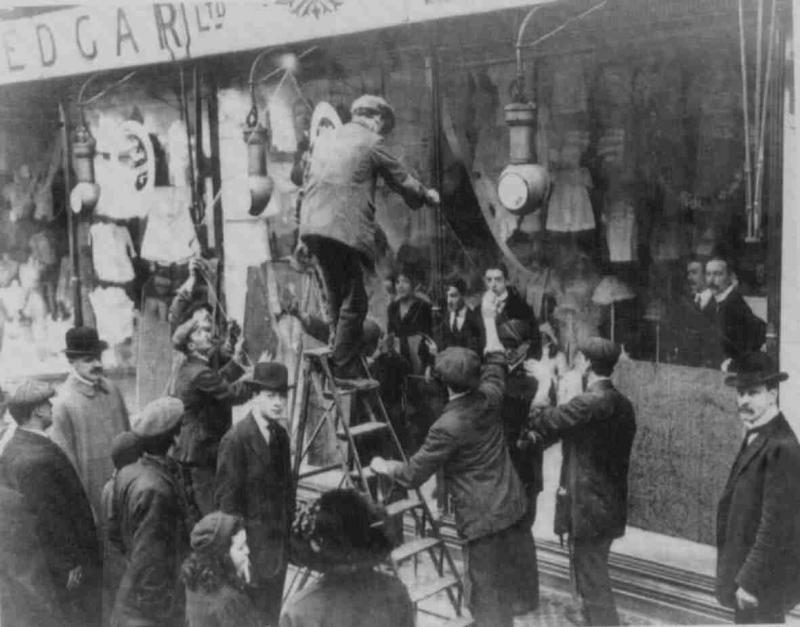
suffragette window smashing campaign

Walton was arrested again in 1912, for causing malicious damage at a Women's Social and Political Union window-smashing campaign in Oxford Street including at Marshall & Snelgrove premises with Eileen Casey. She was imprisoned in Aylesbury Prison where she was force-fed while participating in a hunger strike. At one point Walton said she heard outside the prison a band playing "The March of the Women" and flag waving 'people and our colours and they cheer and bravo us. It has all been grand but oh what a longing it gives one to be away from this place.' The hunger strikers were to be force fed three times a day and Walton had 'fine tussles before they get us tied into the chair". On other days the suffrage prisoners played games together to keep their spirits up like obstacle races, golf with sticks and stones, tennis with stone and dustbin lid using a prison bench as a net, although Walton's legs were 'very thin and shaky'. The women could reduce their sentence by working on making aprons, and the governor William Winder, ignored the suffragette slogans they embroidered 'Deeds not Words' and 'Dare to be Free' though they were made to unpick them before leaving gaol.

Walton was given a Hunger Strike Medal 'for Valour' by WSPU.

Walton was arrested a third time in 1914 in Dundee, Scotland, for throwing a ball through the window of King George and Queen Mary's carriage. No charges were filed.

In 1914, at the beginning of World War I Walton joined the Women Police Volunteers In 1920 she joined the Women's Auxiliary Service of the Royal Irish Constabulary. She became a hospital almoner after she was injured in a motorcycle accident.

== Personal life ==
Walton was estranged from her family due to her involvement in militant suffrage activities. Her personal style included wearing her hair short and dressing in suit and tie. She never married. She adopted an orphan girl and named her Christabel. She was a vegetarian and Labour voter. She supported the miners actions in the 1920s.

Walton died of cancer, after refusing treatment as a Christian Scientist, in 1937.

== See also ==
- List of suffragists and suffragettes
