= Fanny Pease =

British nurse and militant suffragette

Fanny J. Pease ARRC, RN
- Born: 1866; Woolwich, London, United Kingdom
- Died: 1946 (aged 79–80); Hove , East Sussex, UK
- Education: Hospital for Consumption, Brompton Road, London.
- Occupation: Nurse
- Known for: Military Nurse and Militant Suffragette
- Awards: Royal Red Cross (Second class)

Fanny Jane Pease (1866–1946) was a British nurse and militant suffragette.

== Early life and nursing career ==
Fanny Pease was born in 1866 in Woolwich, South London to Mary and Joseph Pease, descendants of the nineteenth century industrialist and philanthropic Pease family of the north of England.

She trained to be a nurse and was a staff nurse at the Hospital for Consumption, South Kensington, London SW3 (1888–1891). She was registered by the General Nursing Council in 1924. She was subsequently a private duty nurse.

== Women's Suffrage Movement ==
Pease was a member of the Church League for Women's Suffrage and publicly named subscriber to the Women's Social and Political Union (WSPU). She was arrested attempting to petition Parliament on 18 November 1910 (Black Friday) and charged with obstruction and assault of a policeman. These charges she denied as she stated she was trying to restrain the policeman after he had hit an elderly fellow WSPU petitioner. Pease received a 14-day custodial sentence in HM Prison Holloway.

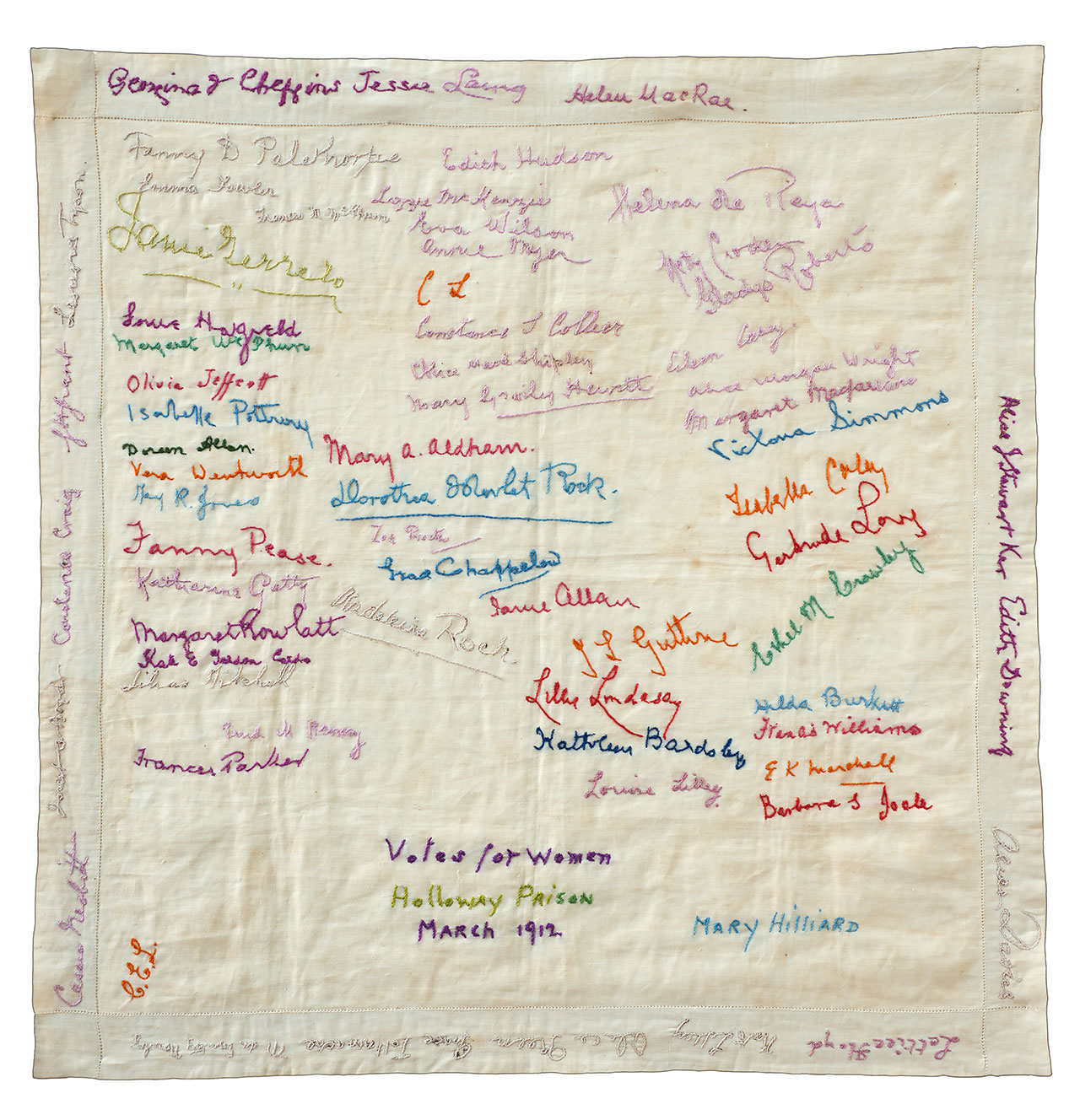
The Suffragette Handkerchief with Fanny Pease's embroidered signature.

Pease was arrested a second time for smashing a pane of glass at Mansion House in March 1912. Pease was sentenced to two months hard labour in Holloway Prison. Her subsequent hunger strike and force feeding were commemorated on the embroidered Suffragette Handkerchief. Pease subsequently used her status as a nurse to write to the Home Secretary and newspapers to protest about unhealthy conditions in the prison.

== World War I and later nursing career ==
In 1915, during the early stages of World War I, Pease was selected to be funded by the subscribers of the Nursing Times to join military nurses in France. Pease served in the Territorial Forces Nursing Services (TFNS) France, Egypt and in Hull UK. For her military nursing service she was awarded the Royal Red Cross medal, second class in 1919.

After the war Pease resumed her civilian nursing career as a hospital employed nurse at the Hospital for Consumption, Brompton Road, London.

On her retirement she moved to Hove, Sussex and died on 19 October 1946, leaving £969 12s 1d.
