= The Suffragette Handkerchief =

Handkerchief embroidered by suffragettes

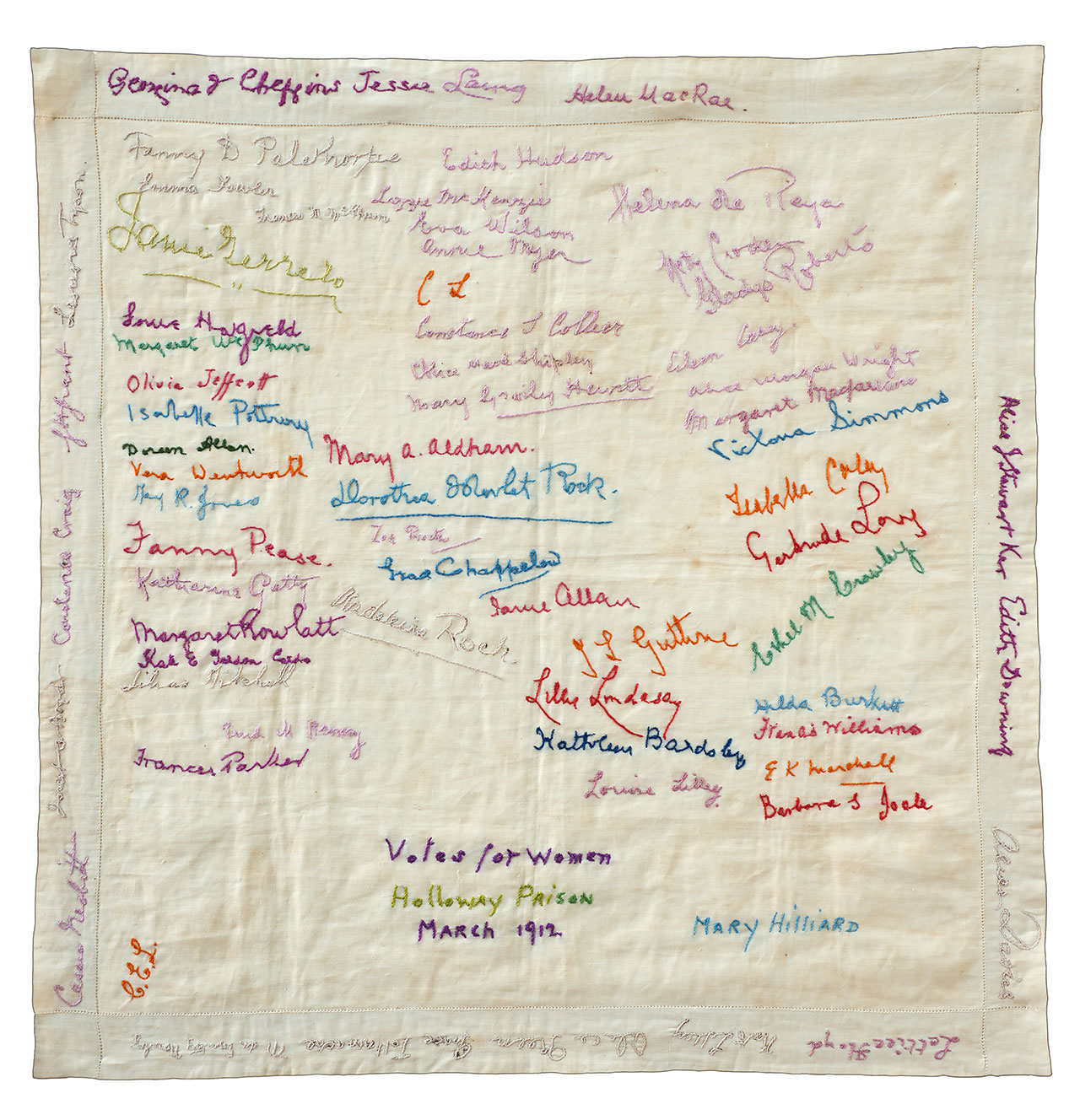
The Suffragette Handkerchief (March 1912)

The Suffragette Handkerchief is a handkerchief displayed at The Priest House, West Hoathly in West Sussex, England. It has sixty-six embroidered signatures and two sets of initials, mostly of women imprisoned in HMP Holloway for their part in the Women's Social and Political Union Suffragette window smashing demonstrations of March 1912. The Handkerchief was an act of defiance in a prison where the women were closely watched at all times.

== Origin ==
It is believed that the Handkerchief was started by Mary Ann Hilliard as she kept it as a souvenir of her fellow prisoners afterwards until donating it to the archive of the British College of Nurses. The March 1942 issue of the British Journal of Nursing recorded that:

Miss Mary Hilliard, a gentle, very valiant suffragette, has bestowed as a gift to the College the fine linen handkerchief, signed by and embroidered by all the gallant women who suffered imprisonment for conscience sake, in support of the enfranchisement of women in Holloway prison in March 1912. It displays 67 signatures embroidered in various colours, and all that remains is to offer a warm vote of thanks to Miss Mary Hilliard, R.B.N.A., and to await the time when this historic gift can be suitably framed and placed in the History Section of the British College of Nurses, where its unique value will be appreciated.’

Of the 66 women whose full names appear on the handkerchief, 61 are known to have been arrested on the window-smashing campaign of March 1912, receiving prison sentences ranging from two to six months. Sixteen of the women held positions in local branches of the Women's Social and Political Union in 1912, 18 had served earlier sentences prison for their actions on behalf of women's suffrage, and at least four were arrested subsequently. Twenty-four of the women on the handkerchief took part in the hunger strikes of 1912, and fifteen were forcibly-fed. These women received the Hunger Strike Medal from the leadership of the WSPU.

== Later ownership and exhibition ==
It is not known how the Handkerchief came to leave the collection of the British College of Nurses after it closed in 1956 or how it came to be found in the 1960s at a jumble sale at West Hoathly by Dora Arnold, custodian of the Priest House. Its link to the village of West Hoathly is not clear (although an owner of the Priest House in the early 20th-century, John Godwin King's daughter Ursula, was a member of the National Union of Women's Suffrage Societies) and research is ongoing. The list of the signatories and some notes on their activism is available.

The Suffragette Handkerchief is displayed on the first floor of The Priest House, West Hoathly. From September 2018 to January 2019, the Handkerchief was displayed at the Royal College of Physicians as part of the 'This vexed question: 500 years of women in medicine' exhibition. A particular focus of the exhibition was the signature of Alice Stewart Ker (1853–1943), a Scottish doctor who worked as a surgeon at the Children's Hospital in Birmingham, and who was honorary Medical Officer to the Wirral Hospital for Sick Children. Dr Ker had been active in the Birkenhead Women's Suffrage Society, and in 1912 was sentenced to three months in Holloway Prison for smashing a window at Harrods.

== Signatories ==
- Mary Ann Aldham
- Janie Allan
- Doreen Allen
- Kathleen Bardsley
- Janet Boyd
- Hilda Burkitt
- Eileen Casey
- Isabella Casey
- Kate E. Teresa Cardro
- Grace Chappelow
- Georgina Fanny Cheffins
- Constance J. Collier
- Constance Craig
- Ethel M. Crawby
- Nelly Crocker
- Alice Davies
- Edith Downing
- Emma Fowler
- Lettice Floyd
- Katherine Gatty
- G. H. Grant
- Alice Green
- Joan Lavender Bailie Guthrie
- Louise Hargeld
- Mary Graily Hewitt
- Mary Ann Hilliard
- Edith Hudson
- Olivia Jeffcott
- Barbara S. Jocke
- May R. Jones
- Alice Stewart Ker
- C. L. (possibly Catherine Lane, who was arrested on 1 March 1912 and was bound over and released in April)
- C. E. L.
- Jessie Laing.
- Kate Lilley
- Louise Lilley
- Lillie Lindesay
- Gertrude Lowy
- Margaret Macfarlane
- Helen MacRae
- Lizzie McKenzie
- Frances McPhun
- Margaret McPhun
- E. K. Marshall
- Lillias Mitchell
- Anne Myer
- Cassie Nesbit
- Fanny D. Palethorpe
- Frances Parker
- Fanny Pease
- Isabella Potbury
- Zoe Proctor
- M. Renny
- Helena de Reya
- Gladys Roberts
- Dorothea Rock
- Madeleine Rock
- Margaret Rowlatt
- M. du Sautoy Newby
- Alice Maud Shipley
- Victoria Simmons
- Janie Terrero
- Grace Tollamache
- Leonora Tyson
- Vera Wentworth
- Frances Williams
- Eva Wilson
- Alice Morgan Wright

== See also ==
- Emmeline and Christabel Pankhurst Memorial
- Holloway brooch
- Holloway banner
- Hunger Strike Medal
- Suffrage jewellery
