= Edith Downing =

British artist, sculptor (1857–1931)

- Edith Downing at work.
- Born: Edith Elizabeth Downing; 1857; Cardiff, Wales
- Died: 3 October 1931 (aged 73–74); Surrey, England
- Known for: Sculpture and women's suffrage

Edith Elizabeth Downing (January 1857 – 3 October 1931) was a British artist, sculptor and suffragette.

== Life ==
Edith Elizabeth Downing was born in Cardiff, Wales in January 1857. She was one of four children of the coal merchant and shipping agent Edward Downing, having two sisters and a brother, Edward. Her sister Mary was also to become an artist, whilst her other sister, Caroline Lowder Downing, was to join the Women's Social and Political Union with Edith. After attending Cheltenham College, Edith spent most of her working life based in Chelsea. She died in October 1931 in Surrey.

== Career ==
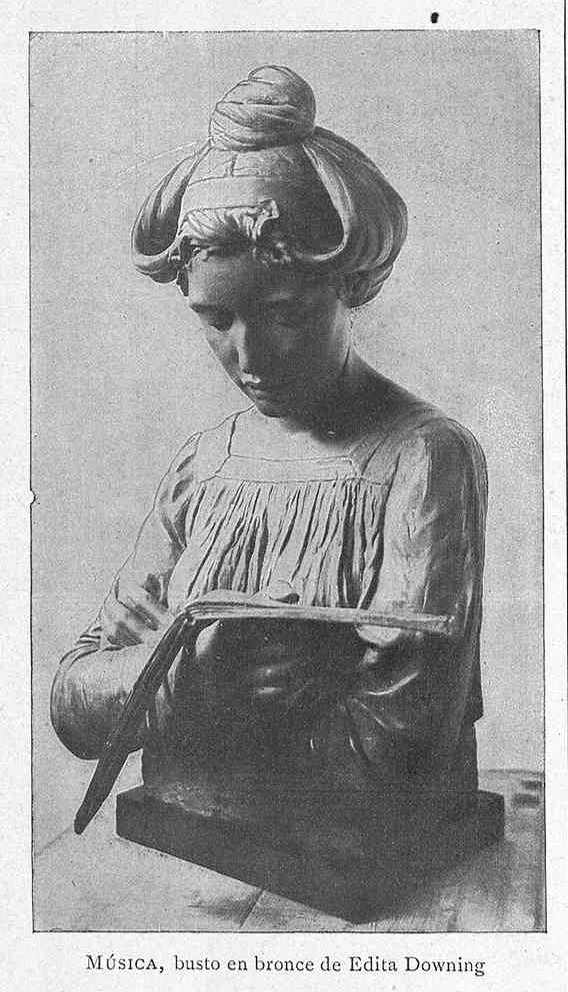
Bust by Edith Downing

Edith Downing first trained at the South Kensington School of Art before attending the Slade School of Art between 1892 and 1893. Downing worked with bronze and marble to create complex statues. She also produced other forms of artwork using watercolours. Downing exhibited her artwork at many acclaimed places such as the Royal Academy, the Royal Glasgow Institute, the Paris Salon, and the Society of Women Artists. She was also a member of the South Wales Art Society between 1896 and 1900. An alabaster altarpiece she created as a memorial to Wilfrid Clive, who died at the age of 26 having been overcome by sulphurous volcanic fumes whilst on a visit to Dominica, can also be seen in St. Peter's Church, Wormbridge, Herefordshire. Downing also used her artistic talents to support her activities as a suffragette, both by working with her fellow artist Marion Wallace-Dunlop to organise a series of dramatic processions and by selling her work to raise funds for the movement. These included statuettes entitled 'A Sketch' and 'Peter Pan' in 1908 and statuettes of Christabel Pankhurst and Annie Kenney in 1909.

== Suffragette activity ==
Edith Downing joined the Central Society for Women's Suffrage in 1903 and the London Society for Women's Suffrage in 1906. In 1908, Edith and her sister, Caroline Lowder Downing, joined the Chelsea branch of the more radical Women's Social and Political Union (WSPU). The WSPU was founded in 1903 to secure voting rights for women. This group was known to have more radical ideas about women’s rights than other suffrage organizations at the time. After the arrest of one of their members in 1905, the WSPU became more aggressive against those disagreeing with their cause. Violent outbursts and damaging of property were both tactics used by the WSPU to raise public awareness of their movement.

In November 1911, Downing participated in several protests including one in Parliament Square and another at Somerset House. At Somerset House, Downing was arrested for breaking a window with a rock. As a result, she was sentenced to a week in jail. On 1 March 1912, Downing was arrested a second time for participating in another window-breaking WPSU protest held by a group of about 200 organised activists, including Edith's sister Caroline, in the West End of London. In this incident, she broke a fine art dealer's window.

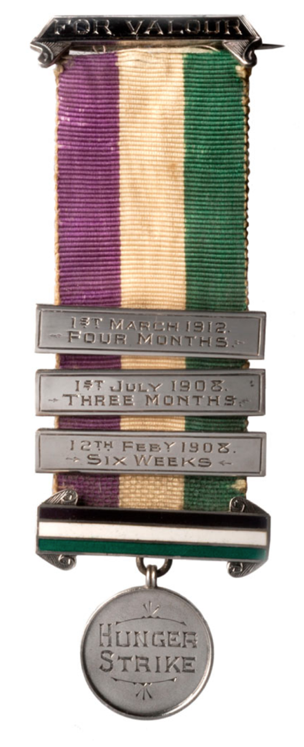
Hunger Strike Medal

Many suffragette women continued their protests while incarcerated by going on hunger strikes. As a way to manage these protests, Winson Green prison began force-feeding the women on strike. Other prisons experiencing this issue also practiced force feeding. The women on strike were forcibly fed using rubber tubes. This was dangerous for the recipient and some women suffered lifelong injuries as a result. Downing participated in the hunger strikes and was subsequently force fed during her time spent in Holloway Prison.

In 1913, the Temporary Discharge for Ill-health, also known as the Cat and Mouse Act, was passed. This released the starving prisoners who were on hunger strike from prison. After the women’s bodies recovered, the authorities were prompted to re-arrest them.

Downing was one of the activists who spoke about the police brutality and stated that some women were prepared to die for the right to vote. She was one of the 68 women who embroidered their signatures or initials on The Suffragette Handkerchief under the noses of the prison staff. Downing was released at the end of June. Edith Downing was given a Hunger Strike Medal 'for Valour' by WSPU for her time spent in prison. For her time spent in prison. These medals often modeled the look of military medals from that time and had “Hunger Strike” engraved at the bottom.

== Artworks ==
During her time as an artist, Edith Downing created several notable works. Her statues often favored realism and heavily emphasized human expression, particularly in the faces she sculpted.

Many of her artworks were created with the intent of being sold so the profits donated to the suffrage movement. Edith sold her bronze sculpture titled Boy with Cherry for this exact purpose.

=== Avarice ===
Common political themes have also appeared in many of Downing’s artworks. In the sculpture Avarice, a woman is kneeling on a stone block with a money bag at her side. Her arm is outstretched as if she is begging for more money. Not much is known about this piece, however, given Downing’s suffragette and political activity, it is possible that it was inspired by a financial crisis that occurred during her lifetime. Avarice can be found displayed in the West staircase of the National Museum of Wales.

=== Music ===
The artwork, Music, created in 1897, depicts a bust of a young unnamed woman with folded arms made out of bronze. It shows her concentration while reading sheet music from Psalms. Another possible title of this artwork is “Music sent up to God.”

=== Sulks ===
Sulks, a bust created in 1906 appears to be a young child with a bow in her hair looking downward.

=== Lyric Music ===
Lyric Music, created in 1909, shows a woman with the upper half of her body uncovered, sitting while playing a musical instrument.

Boy with Cherry, Avarice, Music, Sulks, Lyric Music, and other artworks by Edith Downing were all gifted to the National Museum of Wales in 1930, one year before her death.
