= The Priest House, West Hoathly =

Listed building in West Sussex, England

The Priest House
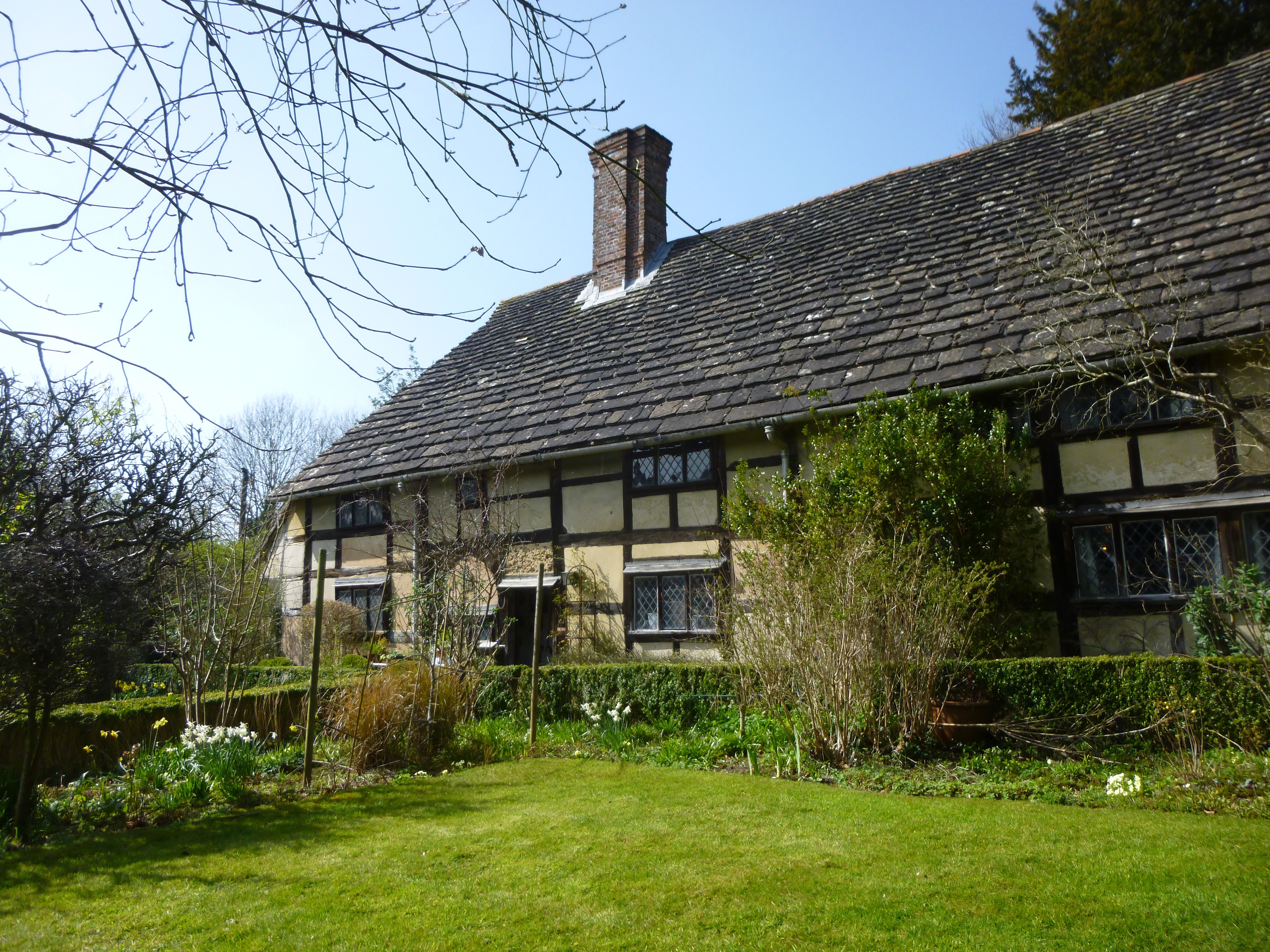
- The Priest House and garden, West Hoathly

- Location within West Sussex

General information
- Location: West Hoathly, West Sussex, England
- Coordinates: 51.07578°N 0.05618°W
- Year built: 15th century

Listed Building – Grade II*
- Official name: Priest House
- Designated: 28 October 1957
- Reference no.: 1025556

The Priest House is a Grade II* listed, 15th-century timber-framed hall house in the centre of West Hoathly, in West Sussex, England. It is close to The Cat Inn and St Margaret's Church. It is now a museum, open to the public six days a week from March to October.

== History ==
The Priest House was built for the Priory of St Pancras in Lewes as an estate office to manage the land they owned around West Hoathly, but was seized by Henry VIII following the dissolution of the monasteries. Subsequently, it belonged to Anne of Cleves, Thomas Cromwell, Mary I and Elizabeth I although there is no evidence that any of them visited the property. It passed into private ownership in 1560 and was owned by the Browne family (who were yeoman farmers) until 1695. For the following 200 years it was owned by absentee landlords who allowed it to fall into disrepair. It was bought by John Godwin King and restored for him by Maurice Pocock in 1908. John Godwin King presented it to the Sussex Archaeological Society in 1935. The house and garden have been open to the public since 1908. It is now a museum of local life with country furniture, ironwork and local history with temporary exhibitions. The cottage garden features large herbaceous borders containing over 170 herbs and perennials and is open to the public from March to October. The garden has been opened twice per annum for the National Gardens Scheme for the past twenty-two years.

== Architecture ==
The Priest House was originally built as a hall house with a central hearth and was probably thatched. The frame is made of oak, held together with oak pegs, then filled with panels of wattle and daub (there are exposed panels visible in the south bedroom). It had five bays, the solar wing being in the northern two bays, the middle two bays were the hall and the southernmost the service end with buttery and pantry. At this time the house was lit by a large unglazed window. The floor was earthen, covered with rushes and sweet smelling herbs. About 1580 a central chimney was inserted, an upper floor put in the central two bays where the hall was and the house was reroofed with a Horsham Slab stone roof. The roof weighs approximately 16 tons The inglenook fireplaces are made of local stone and have curves on the side where knives have been sharpened. The original pointed doorway was blocked and a new doorway inserted in the wall beside it. The roof is an unbroken ridge line with three of the original trusses remaining: the middle truss of the hall had arched braces below the tie beam of which one brace still remains. The roof construction is a crown post and collar purlin. The rafters are in pairs, halved at the top and held together by a horizontal collar. Supporting the collars is the "collar purlin"; supported by the crown posts, which take the weight of the roof down to the tie beams. This is all held in place by curved braces next truss to the north was the closed frame of the end of the hall bays and it has a visible king post strutted from the tie beam. The south end of the house has a sloping catslide roof, also of Horsham slab.

== Suffragette Handkerchief ==
On the first floor The Suffragette Handkerchief is on display. There are sixty-six embroidered signatures and two sets of initials, mostly of women imprisoned in HMP Holloway for their part in the Women's Social and Political Union Suffragette window smashing demonstrations of March 1912. The handkerchief was found at a local jumble sale by Dora Arnold, custodian in the 1960s. Its link to the village of West Hoathly is not clear (although John Godwin King's daughter Ursula was a member of the National Union of Women's Suffrage Societies) and research is ongoing. The list of the signatories and some notes on their activism is available.

== Witch marks ==
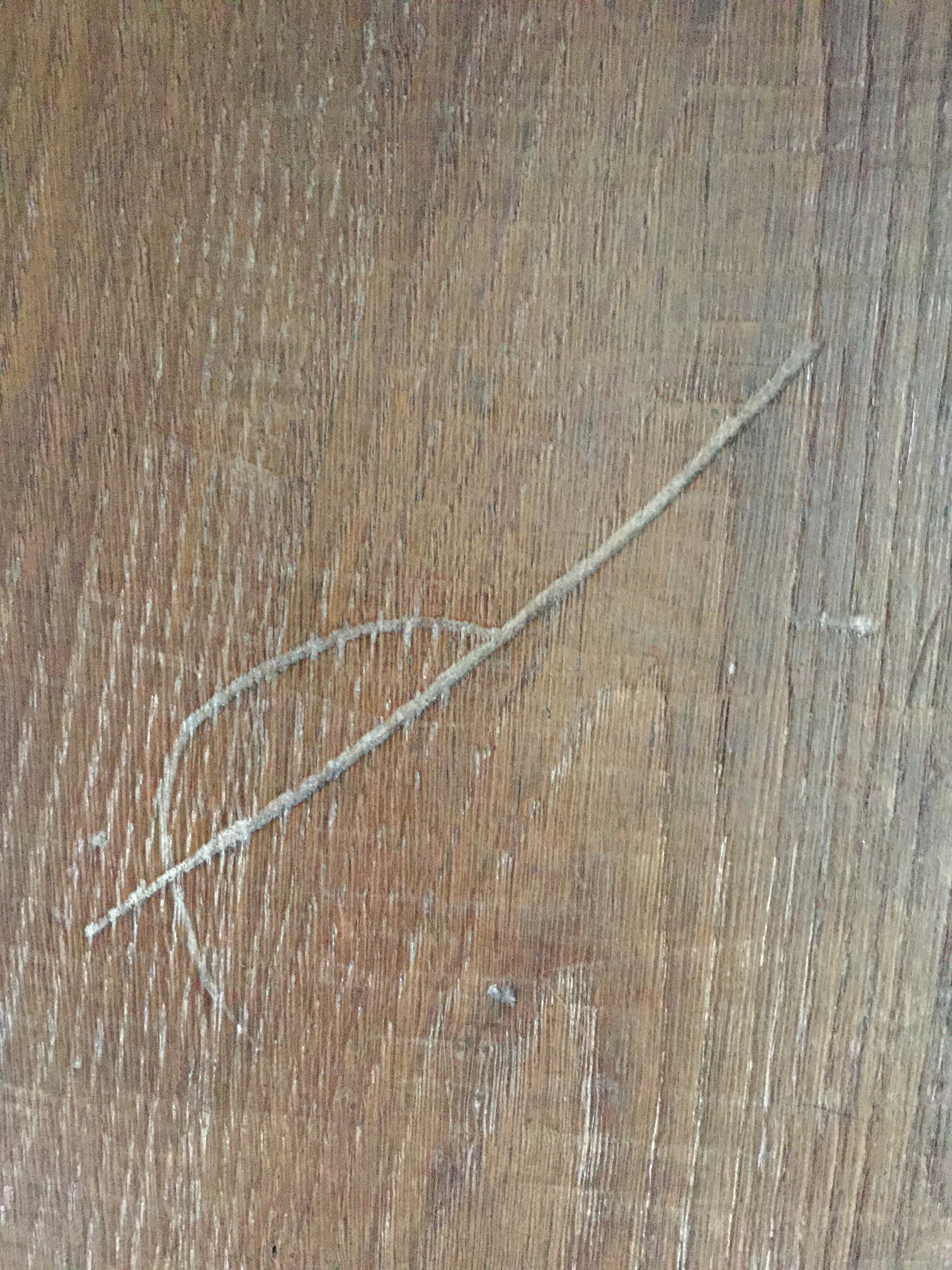
Apotropaic carving on a door at the Priest House West Hoathly

There are witch marks scratched into wood in several places in the house, including the front door and on the beam above the main fireplace. These are more properly known as apotropaic marks and were believed to prevent witches from entering the house. They are believed to date from the 17th century. Set into the ground outside the front door is a rough slab of iron which is waste from a local furnace. This was believed to prevent witches entering the house (witches were commonly believed to be scared of iron).

== See also ==
- Grade II* listed buildings in West Sussex
