= Nicholas Ennis =

Nicholas Ennis MP

Member of Parliament for County Meath
- In office 31 January 1874 – 31 March 1880 Serving with Charles Stewart Parnell (1875 – 1880); John Martin (1874 – 1875)
- Preceded by: John Martin; Edward McEvoy
- Succeeded by: Robert Henry Metge; Charles Stewart Parnell

Personal details
- Born: 1815
- Died: 27 May 1881 (aged 65–66)
- Party: Home Rule

Nicholas Ennis (1815– 27 May 1881) was an Irish Home Rule League politician.

He was elected as one of the two Members of Parliament (MPs) for County Meath in 1874, but did not stand at the next election in 1880.

Parliament of the United Kingdom
Preceded by John Martin; Edward McEvoy	Member of Parliament for County Meath; 1874 – 1880; With: Charles Stewart Parnell (1875 – 1880); John Martin (1874 – 1875)	Succeeded by Robert Henry Metge; Charles Stewart Parnell
