= Edward McEvoy =

Irish politician

Edward McEvoy MP

Member of Parliament for County Meath
- In office 17 December 1855 – 9 February 1874 Serving with John Martin (1871–1874); Matthew Corbally (1855–1870)
- Preceded by: Frederick Lucas; Matthew Corbally
- Succeeded by: John Martin; Nicholas Ennis

Personal details
- Born: 5 September 1826
- Died: 10 February 1899 (aged 72) Tobertinan House, County Meath
- Party: Liberal
- Other political affiliations: Independent Irish Party (until 1859)
- Spouse: Eliza Browne (m. 1850)

Edward Francis McEvoy, sometimes spelled MacEvoy, (5 September 1826 – 10 February 1899) was an Irish Liberal and Independent Irish Party politician.

McEvoy was the son of James McEvoy of Tobertinan (Tobertynan House & Estate, Rathmolyon, County Meath) and Theresa Maria Meredyth, daughter of Sir Joshua Colles Meredyth. He joined Magdalene College, Cambridge in 1845. In April 1846, he joined the 6th Dragoon Guards as a cornet, and between 1847 and 1851, he was a lieutenant of the same group. He married Eliza Browne, daughter of Andrew Browne of Mount Hazel in 1850. Together they had one child: Pauline Mary McEvoy (c. 1868–1944), who married the 4th Duke of Stacpoole.

At some point, he was a Justice of the Peace. He also received the Order of St. Gregory the Great.

At the 1855 County Meath by-election, McEvoystood as an Independent Irish candidate and was elected as one of the two Members of Parliament (MPs) for County Meath . He was again elected at the next general election in 1859 and shortly after joined the Liberal Party on its formation. He then held the seat until 1874 when he stood down.

== Arms ==
Coat of arms of Edward McEvoy

Notes
Confirmed 4 July 1855 by Sir John Bernard Burke, Ulster King of Arms.
Crest
A cubit arm erect vested Gules cuffed Erminois in the hand a sword Proper.
Torse
Of the colours.
Escutcheon
Per fess Azure and per pale Or and Ermien a fess Gules issuant therefrom a demi-lion Argnet in the dexter base a dexter hand couped at the wrist of the fourth.
Motto
Bear And Forbear

Parliament of the United Kingdom
Preceded by Frederick Lucas; Matthew Corbally	Member of Parliament for County Meath; 1855 – 1874; With: John Martin (1871–1874); Matthew Corbally (1855–1870)	Succeeded by John Martin; Nicholas Ennis
