= William Meagher (Irish politician) =

Irish politician (died 1897)

Member of Parliament
- In office 1884–1885
- Constituency: County Meath

Lord Mayor of Dublin
- In office 1884–1885
- Preceded by: Charles Dawson
- Succeeded by: John O'Connor

Personal details
- Died: 24 March 1897
- Party: Home Rule League

William Meagher (died 24 March 1897) was an Irish businessman and politician, who represented County Meath for the Home Rule League from 1884 to 1885.

== Career ==
Meagher was a prominent Dublin wine merchant and vintner, who was elected to the city council as alderman for the North Dock Ward. He held the post for several years before becoming Lord Mayor of Dublin in 1884. That same year, he was elected to Parliament in a by-election in County Meath after the incumbent, Robert Henry Metge, resigned. He was elected unopposed as a Home Rule League candidate. He did not seek re-election at the 1885 general election.

Civic offices
Preceded by Charles Dawson	Lord Mayor of Dublin; 1884–1885	Succeeded by John O'Connor
