= List of suffragette bombings =

The following list of suffragette bombings is a list of bombings carried out by the Women's Social and Political Union (WSPU) in the United Kingdom of Great Britain and Ireland during the suffragette bombing and arson campaign of 1912–1914.

== 1912 ==
- 19 July 1912: Several bombs are set off at the Theatre Royal, Dublin, and the theatre itself is set on fire using petrol, during a performance attended by the Prime Minister H. H. Asquith. Four suffragettes are subsequently charged with offences likely to endanger life.
- 19 July 1912: A powerful bomb is planted in Home Secretary Reginald McKenna's office but is discovered.
- 28 November to 3 December 1912: As part of a 5-day long nationwide pillar box sabotage campaign, a number of letter bombs are sent by suffragettes, many of which burst into flames at post offices around the country.

== 1913 ==
- 29 January 1913: A number of letter bombs are sent to Chancellor David Lloyd George and Prime Minister Asquith, but they all explode or are discovered while in transit. More are sent over the following weeks.
- 6 February 1913: 5 Dundee postmen are burned, four severely, when handling a suffragette letter bomb addressed to Asquith.
- 19 February 1913: Suffragettes bomb Chancellor David Lloyd George's house, with two bombs being planted by Emily Davison. Only one bomb functions but significant damage is done to the building, although there are no injuries.
- 22 February 1913: A postman is burned at Lewisham post office, South London, when handling a suffragette letter bomb.
- 3 April 1913: A bomb explodes next to a train line in Stockport, on the outskirts of Manchester, while a passenger train is passing. The explosion nearly kills the driver when his head is grazed by flying debris.
- 4 April 1913: A sophisticated bomb explodes in the lavatory at Oxted railway station, Surrey. The clockwork mechanism and battery are recovered.
- 4 April 1913: A bomb is discovered emitting smoke in the busy street outside the Bank of England and quickly defused. Had it exploded, it likely would have caused casualties in what was then one of the busiest streets in the capital.
- 8 April 1913: Bomb explodes in the grounds of Dudley Castle.
- 8 April 1913: Two bombs are planted in passenger carriages on the Waterloo to Kingston train line. One bomb is discovered early, but the other explodes as the train from Waterloo arrives at Kingston, causing a fire. The rest of the carriages are full of passengers, but they manage to escape.
- 17 April 1913: Bomb discovered at Aberdeen railway station, with a gunpowder charge. A railway porter defused the bomb.
- 18 April 1913: A plot to blow up the grandstand at Crystal Palace football ground on the eve of the 1913 FA Cup Final is foiled.
- 20 April 1913: Attempt to bomb the offices of the York Herald newspaper in York.
- 23 April 1913: Bomb explodes at the Free Trade Hall, Manchester.
- 24 April 1913: Bomb explodes at the Crown Court in Newcastle. The device was a 2 ft (61 cm) long pipe bomb. Seconds before the explosion a caretaker had discovered a note that stated "Beware dangerous bomb – run for your life". At that point the bomb exploded nearby, causing considerable damage.
- April 1913: Bomb discovered in the Lyceum Theatre in Taunton, bearing slogans such as "Judges beware", "Martyrs of the law" and "Release our sisters".
- April 1913: A bomb is discovered at Smeaton's Tower, an old lighthouse on Plymouth Hoe, painted with the words "Votes For Women. Death In Ten Minutes".
- 2 May 1913: A highly dangerous and unstable nitroglycerine bomb is discovered on the busy platform of Piccadilly Circus tube station. Although it had the potential to harm many on the platform, the bomb is dealt with.
- 5 May 1913: Gunpowder and nitroglycerine parcel bomb discovered at Borough Market Post office, London.
- 6 May 1913: Bomb placed on the steps of the Grand Hotel in Northumberland Avenue, Charing Cross, London by Ada Ward. A policeman who observed her place the bomb defused it and arrested Ward.
- 7 May 1913: The cricket pavilion at Bishops Park in Fulham burns down after the explosion of an incendiary device.
- 7 May 1913: An incendiary device sets fire to a woodyard in Lambeth, London.
- 7 May 1913: A house in Hendon, London is set on fire after an explosion of an incendiary device. There are no injuries.
- 8 May 1913: A sophisticated potassium nitrate bomb is discovered at the start of a sermon at St Paul's Cathedral, London. The device was packed with nuts and bolts to act as shrapnel.
- 10 May 1913: A bomb is discovered in the waiting room at Liverpool Street Station, London, made out of iron nuts and bolts intended to maximise damage to property and cause serious injury to anyone in proximity.
- 10 May 1913: A bomb is planted at the Cambridge University football ground pavilion.
- 10 May 1913: A bomb is planted at the busy Empire Theatre, Dublin. A woman discovered the bomb, made from 24 cartridges of gunpowder, with the fuse burning in the ladies lavatory. She picked up the device and plunged it into water in a sink, extinguishing the fuse.
- 10 May 1913: A parcel bomb is discovered at Reading Post Office, addressed to the municipal office in the town. The parcel had been found ticking and a postal device connected to a timer was recovered. The explosive charge consisted of gunpowder and nitroglycerine.
- 12 May 1913: A bomb is planted at the Limpsfield Badminton and Lawn Tennis Club. The caretaker discovers the bomb when he hears ticking upon opening in the morning. The device was a time bomb made out of nitroglycerine.
- 14 May 1913: Three nitroglycerine bombs are discovered in a carriage of a crowded passenger train arriving from Waterloo at Kingston.
- 14 May 1913: A letter bomb is sent to allegedly anti-women's suffrage magistrate Sir Henry Curtis-Bennett at Bow Street in an attempt to assassinate him, but the bomb is intercepted by London postal workers.
- 15 May 1913: A small bomb is planted outside the National Gallery, Trafalgar Square, London, but fails to explode.
- 16 May 1913: A bomb is discovered at Westbourne Park tube station before it can explode.
- 16 May 1913: Bomb planted in a library in South London.
- 16 May 1913: Bomb planted in a church in Hastings.
- 16 May 1913: Bomb planted in a hotel in Brentwood.
- 17 May 1913: A bomb, containing 12lb of gunpowder, is planted in St Mary's Church in Dalkeith Park, Scotland, but fails to explode.
- 21 May 1913: A bomb explodes at the Royal Observatory in Edinburgh, causing serious damage.
- 27 May 1913: A bomb is thrown from an express train onto Reading station platform and explodes, but there are no injuries.
- May 1913: Bomb found in a billiard room at a Dundee sports venue.
- 2 June 1913: Letter bomb discovered at the South Eastern District Post Office, London, containing enough nitroglycerine to blow up the entire building and kill the 200 people who worked there.
- 11 June 1913: A bomb exploded at the Post Office in Newcastle upon Tyne.
- 15 June 1913: A bomb is discovered at Eden Park railway station, Beckenham. It was determined that the clockwork timer had failed to function.
- 17 June 1913: A bomb is thrown from Blackfriars Bridge, London. It exploded as it hit the water of the River Thames. The railway bridge was shaken by the explosion and railway workers rushed to the scene to check that no damage had been done to the bridge.
- 18 June 1913: A bomb explodes on the Stratford-upon-Avon Canal in Yardley Wood, Birmingham, causing serious damage to the canal but failing to burst its banks. Since there was no lock for 11 miles, a breech would have emptied all of this section's water into the populated valley below.
- 5 July 1913: A bomb explodes at the Liverpool Cotton Exchange Building. Edith Rigby is arrested and reveals she planted it "to show how easy it was to get explosives and put them in public places".
- 7 July 1913: A bomb is planted on the Brock Aqueduct in Manchester, but is discovered by an inspector before it can explode. The destruction of the aqueduct could have had very serious consequences.
- 7 July 1913: Edith Rigby claimed to have set fire to the bungalow of Sir William Lever, Bt (later Lord Leverhulme) at Rivington, although it is suspected her confession was false. The property contained valuable paintings and the fire resulted in damage costing £20,000.
- 8 July 1913: Device explodes on a train carriage in Newton Heath, Manchester.
- 8 July 1913: A bomb is placed on the parcel counter at the main post office at Blackburn but is discovered before it can explode.
- 19 July 1913: A bomb is discovered at Haslemere station.
- July 1913: Bomb planted at a Birmingham railway station by Lillias Mitchell and Mary Richardson.
- July 1913: Margaret Mackworth places an explosive substance containing phosphorus and another more dangerous chemical in a post office letter box in Caerleon, Wales, causing it to burst into flames. Upon observing this, passers-by restrain Mackworth and she is arrested.
- 8 August 1913: A school is bombed and subsequently burns down in Sutton-in-Ashfield while David Lloyd George is visiting the town.
- 1 September 1913: A bomb is found in Cheltenham Town Hall.
- 11 November 1913: Large explosion of a gunpowder pipe bomb at a building in Alexandra Park, Manchester, which is being used as a cactus house.
- 15 November 1913: The Palm House in Sefton Park, Liverpool is subjected to a bomb attack.
- 18 December 1913: A wall at Holloway Prison is bombed. Many houses near the prison are damaged and have their windows blown out, showering some children with glass while they slept. One of the perpetrators of the attack is injured.
- 22 December 1913: Several postal workers are burned after letter bombs cause mail bags to ignite in Nottingham.

== 1914 ==
- 6 January 1914: A highly powerful bomb explodes at an electricity generating station in Crown Point, Leeds, damaging the facility.
- 7 January 1914: A dynamite bomb is thrown over the wall of the Harewood Barracks in Leeds, which is being used to train police officers. The explosion injures one man.
- 9 January 1914: A bomb is found in Stratford, London.
- 24 January 1914: Two devices are planted at the Kibble Palace botanic gardens in Glasgow. One bomb was defused by a watchman, but the other then exploded behind him, nearly killing him and shattering the glass conservatory.
- 12 February 1914: A bomb explodes at a house in Moor Hall Green, Birmingham. The property was the home of Arthur Chamberlain, brother of politician Joseph Chamberlain.
- 1 March 1914: A bomb explodes at St. John the Evangelist's church in Smith Square, Westminster.
- 3 April 1914: Three small devices explode at Belmont Church, Glasgow.
- 5 April 1914: A bomb explodes in St Martin-in-the-Fields church in Trafalgar Square, London, blowing out the windows and showering passers-by with broken glass. The explosion also starts a fire in the church.
- 17 April 1914: The Britannia Pier, Great Yarmouth is destroyed after being bombed and burned down.
- 3 May 1914: A bomb is found at Dewsbury reservoir.
- 7 May 1914: An attempt to flood a populated area fails after a bomb is placed next to Penistone Reservoir in Upper Windleden. If successful, the attack would have led to 138 million imperial gallons (630 million litres) of water emptying into the populated valleys below.
- 10 May 1914: A bomb is discovered at the Metropolitan Tabernacle church and defused.
- 22 May 1914: Explosion at the Free Church in Edinburgh.
- 22 May 1914: Two large explosive devices are discovered buried beside a Glasgow Aqueduct by a patrol set up to check for bombs on railway lines and other public places. The bombs had been planted in an attempt to cut off the water supply to the city, but they had failed to explode.
- 23 May 1914: Bomb found at Glasgow Water Works.
- 28 May 1914: Bomb found on a goods train at Wellingborough.
- 5 June 1914: Bomb found in a castle near Dundee.
- 5 June 1914: A bomb explodes loudly at the All Saints' Church in the village of Breadsall in Derbyshire, causing it to burn down, despite attempts by villagers to extinguish the fire.
- 11 June 1914: A bomb explodes at Westminster Abbey, damaging the Coronation Chair and breaking the historic Stone of Scone in half. Nuts and bolts had acted as shrapnel. There were about 80 to 100 people in the Abbey at the time, with some being less than 20 yards (18 m) away, but there were no injures. The explosion caused a panic for the exits, and many from the House of Commons (which at the time was debating the best way of dealing with the violent methods of the suffragettes) came rushing to the scene.
- 13 June 1914: A second bomb is discovered before it can explode in St Paul's Cathedral.
- 13 June 1914: Bomb found in a church at Aston-on-Trent.
- 15 June 1914: Bomb explodes at St George's church in Hanover Square, Westminster, London.
- 16 June 1914: A suffragette is arrested in possession of a bomb at a horse show in Olympia, London.
- 8 July 1914: Two bombs are found at the cottage of Scottish historical figure Robert Burns. The nightwatchman inside the cottage had heard a noise and discovered two women outside placing large explosives outside the building, which likely would have killed him and others inside had they exploded. The man successfully detained one of the women.
- 11 July 1914: A bomb explodes at Roslyn Chapel.
- 11 July 1914: A guard is severely burned when a letter bomb ignites a carriage on a moving train in Salwick. The guard is badly burned on his arms as he throws the burning letter bomb off the train to avoid further damage.
- 12 July 1914: An attempted second bombing of St John the Evangelist church in Smith Square, London by Annie Bell fails after she was noticed behaving strangely during a sermon and then found to have placed a bomb underneath a pew by members of the congregation. Bell, who was already being trailed by Special Branch detectives, was arrested as she left, and the congregation was able to disarm the device before it exploded.
- 1 August 1914: A bomb explodes outside Christ Church Cathedral in Lisburn, Ireland.

== See also ==
- Suffragette bombing and arson campaign
- Women's Social and Political Union
- Emmeline Pankhurst

== Bibliography ==
- Bartley, Paula (1 March 2003). "Emmeline Pankhurst: Paula Bartley Reappraises the Role of the Leader of the Suffragettes". History Review: 41–46. ISSN 0962-9610. Archived from the original on 16 April 2016 – via HighBeam Research.
- Bartley, Paula (27 April 2007). Votes for Women: 1860-1928. Hodder Education Group. ISBN 978-0-340-92685-7.
- Bearman, C. J. (2005). "An Examination of Suffragette Violence". The English Historical Review. 120 (486): 365–397. doi:10.1093/ehr/cei119. ISSN 0013-8266. JSTOR 3490924.
- Jones, Ian (31 October 2016). London: Bombed Blitzed and Blown Up: The British Capital Under Attack Since 1867. Frontline Books. ISBN 978-1-4738-7901-0.
- Kay, Joyce (1 September 2008). "It Wasn't Just Emily Davison! Sport, Suffrage and Society in Edwardian Britain". The International Journal of the History of Sport. 25 (10): 1338–1354. doi:10.1080/09523360802212271. hdl:1893/765. ISSN 0952-3367. S2CID 154063364.
- Metcalfe, Agnes Edith (1917). Woman's Effort: A Chronicle of British Women's Fifty Years' Struggle for Citizenship (1865-1914). B. H. Blackwell.
- Monaghan, Rachel (1 June 1997). "'Votes for women': An analysis of the militant campaign". Terrorism and Political Violence. 9 (2): 65–78. doi:10.1080/09546559708427403. ISSN 0954-6553.
- Monaghan, Rachel (1 October 2000). "Single-Issue Terrorism: A Neglected Phenomenon?". Studies in Conflict & Terrorism. 23 (4): 255–265. doi:10.1080/10576100050174977. ISSN 1057-610X. S2CID 72122553.
- Riddell, Fern (19 April 2018). Death in Ten Minutes: The forgotten life of radical suffragette Kitty Marion. Hodder & Stoughton. ISBN 978-1-4736-6621-4.
- "Suffragette bombings - City of London Corporation". Google Arts & Culture.
- "Suffragettes, violence and militancy". The British Library.
- Walker, Rebecca (2 January 2020). "Deeds, Not Words: The Suffragettes and Early Terrorism in the City of London". The London Journal. 45 (1): 53–64. doi:10.1080/03058034.2019.1687222. ISSN 0305-8034. S2CID 212994082.
- Webb, Simon (2 July 2014). The Suffragette Bombers: Britain's Forgotten Terrorists. Pen and Sword. ISBN 978-1-78340-064-5.
