= John Martin (Young Irelander) =

Irish nationalist activist (1812–1875)

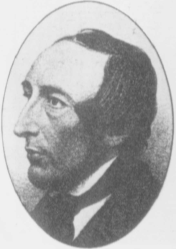
John Martin (1812–1875)

John Martin (8 September 1812 – 29 March 1875) was an Irish nationalist activist who shifted from early militant support for Young Ireland and Repeal, to non-violent alternatives such as support for tenant farmers' rights and eventually as the first Home Rule MP, for County Meath 1871–1875.

== Early life and family ==
John Martin was born into a landed Presbyterian family, the son of Samuel and Jane (née Harshaw) Martin, in Newry, County Down. He first met John Mitchel while attending Dr Henderson's private school in Newry. He received an Arts degree at Trinity College Dublin in 1832 and proceeded to study medicine, but had to abandon this in 1835 when his uncle died and he had to return to manage the family landholding.

In 1847 he was moved by the Famine to join Mitchel in the Repeal Association but subsequently left it with Mitchel. He contributed to Mitchel's journal The United Irishman, and then following Mitchel's arrest on 27 May 1848, Martin continued with his own anti-British journal, The Irish Felon, and established "The Felon Club". This led to a warrant for his arrest, and he turned himself in on 8 July 1848. Martin was sentenced on 18 August 1848 to 10 years transportation to Van Diemen's Land.

=== Henrietta Mitchel ===
Martin married Henrietta Mitchel on 25 November 1868 after 20 years of courtship. She was the youngest sister of John Mitchel. She shared her husband's politics, and after his death campaigned for home rule believing this to be a continuation of the Young Ireland mandate. After the split in the party, she sided with Charles Stewart Parnell. She died at her home in Dublin on 11 July 1913, and is buried in Newry.

== Van Diemen's Land and exile ==
Martin arrived on the Elphinstone with Kevin Izod O'Doherty in Hobart, Tasmania, in November 1849. He accepted a "ticket of leave" which allowed him to live in relative freedom at Bothwell, provided he promised not to escape.

While in Tasmania, Martin continued to meet in secret with his fellow exiles Kevin Izod O'Doherty, Thomas Francis Meagher, William Smith O'Brien, and John Mitchel. He and Mitchel lived together before the arrival of Mitchel's wife, Jenny. He chose not to join Mitchel when Mitchel revoked his ticket of leave and escaped. Instead he remained in Tasmania until he was granted a "conditional pardon" in 1854. This allowed him to leave for Paris, and he returned to Ireland on being granted a full pardon in 1856.

== Later life and Parliament ==
On return to Ireland Martin became a national organiser for the Tenant Right League. He began to write for The Nation in 1860. He formed the National League with others in January 1864 – it was mainly an educational organisation but Fenians disrupted its meetings. He remained in contact with Mitchel in Paris through 1866. Martin opposed the Fenians' support of armed violence, yet, together with Alexander Martin Sullivan, in December 1867 he headed the symbolic funeral march honouring the Manchester Martyrs as it followed the MacManus route to Glasnevin Cemetery, Dublin. He and the other organizers were arrested and tried, but the jury was hung.

Martin was in the United States in December 1869 when he was nominated by Isaac Butt and his nationalists as the Irish nationalist Home Rule candidate to oppose Greville-Nugent, who was supported by the Catholic clergy, in the County Longford by-election. Greville-Nugent initially won the vote but the result was nullified by Judge Fitzgerald on the grounds that voters had been illegally influenced (i.e. bribed and/or coerced) in the non-secret voting process. In the May 1870 re-run, Butt's second candidate, Edward Robert King-Harman—like Martin a Protestant landlord—was also defeated, but this time legally.

These contradictions and factionalism were symptomatic of the struggle for influence and leadership at the time between the waning Church of Ireland and the rising Irish Catholic Church; secular Protestant and Catholic organisations with differing social bases and attitudes to violence; between those who wished to challenge and maintain the sociopolitical status quo; constitutional reform versus revolution; elite versus grassroots movements; landowners versus tenants; Home Rule versus Repeal. Hence a secular Protestant land-owning non-violent elite reformist nationalist who desired Home Rule like Martin, could find himself both sympathetic to and at odds with a militant organisation like the Fenians with their Jacobin- and American-influenced ideas of revolutionary republicanism and different social roots. Until Parnell, the Isaac Butt-originated Home Rule forces could not obtain the support of the Catholic Church under the anti-Fenian Cardinal Paul Cullen or manage to achieve more than short-term tactical alliances with Fenians, leading to a split and uncoordinated opposition to British rule. Protestants such as Martin and John Mitchel, with their early political roots in Young Ireland, were, whatever their political ideals, not part of the majority Catholic mainstream, which consisted largely of tenants rather than landlords.

In the January 1871 by-election, Martin was elected by a margin of 2–1 to the seat of County Meath in the British parliament as the first Home Rule MP, representing first Isaac Butt's Home Government Association and from November 1873 the Home Rule League. This was unusual for a Protestant in a Catholic constituency, and is a measure of the popular esteem Martin was held in. He retained his seat in the February 1874 general election as one of 60 Home Rule members. He was commonly known as "Honest John Martin". In parliament Martin spoke strongly for Home Rule for Ireland and opposed Coercion Bills. He died in Newry, County Down, in March 1875, homeless and in relative poverty, having forgiven tenant fees during preceding years of inflation and low farm prices.

Martin's parliamentary seat of County Meath was taken up by Charles Stewart Parnell.

== Quotes ==
John Martin's statement from the dock before sentencing on 19 August 1848.

"Then, my lords, permit me to say, that admitting the narrow and confined constitutional doctrines, which I have heard preached in this court, to be right, I am not guilty of the charge according to this Act! In the article of mine, on which the jury framed their verdict, which was written in prison, and published in the last number of my paper, what I desired to do was this, to advise and encourage my countrymen to keep their arms; because that is their inalienable right, which no Act of Parliament, no proclamation can take away from them. It is, I repeat, their inalienable right. I advised them to keep their arms; and further, I advised them to use their arms in their own defence against all assailants – even assailants that might come to attack them unconstitutionally and improperly, using the Queen's name as their sanction.

"My object in all my proceeding has been simply to establish the independence of Ireland for the benefit of all the people of Ireland – noblemen, clergymen, judges, professional men – in fact, all Irishmen. I sought that object first, because I thought it was our right; because I thought, and think still, national independence was the right of the people of this country. And secondly, I admit, that being a man who loves retirement, I never would have engaged in politics did I not think it necessary to do all in my power to make an end of the horrible scenes the country presents – the pauperism, and starvation, and crime, and vice, and the hatred of all classes against each other. I thought there should be an end to that horrible system, which while it lasted, gave me no peace of mind, for I could not enjoy anything in my country, so long as I saw my countrymen forced to be vicious, forced to hate each other, and degraded to the level of paupers and brutes. This is the reason I engaged in politics".

John Martin's address to the crowd at Glasnevin Cemetery, Dublin in honour of the Manchester Martyrs 8 December 1867:-

... "The three bodies that we would tenderly bear to the churchyard, and would bury in consecrated ground with all the solemn rites of religion, are not here. They are away in a foreign and hostile land (hear, hear), where they have been thrown into unconsecrated ground, branded by the triumphant hatred of our enemies as the vile remains of murderers (cries of 'no murderers,' and cheers). Those three men whose memories we are here to-day to honour – Allen, O'Brien, and Larkin – they were not murderers (great cheering). (A Voice – Lord have mercy on them.) Mr. Martin – These men were pious men, virtuous men – they were men who feared God and loved their country. They sorrowed for the sorrows of the dear old native land of their love (hear, hear). They wished, if possible, to save her, and for that love and for that wish they were doomed to an ignominious death at the hands of the British hangman (hear, hear). It was as Irish patriots that these men were doomed to death (cheers)...

... "You will join with me now in repeating the prayer of the three martyrs whom we mourn – 'God Save Ireland!' And all of you, men, women, and boys and girls that are to be men and women of holy Ireland, will ever keep the sentiment of that prayer in your heart of hearts."

== See also ==
- List of convicts transported to Australia

== Notes ==
Parliament of the United Kingdom
Preceded by Matthew Corbally; Edward McEvoy	Member of Parliament for County Meath; 1871 – 1875; With: Edward McEvoy to 1874; Nicholas Ennis from 1874	Succeeded by Charles Stewart Parnell; Nicholas Ennis
