= County Meath (UK Parliament constituency) =

UK parliamentary constituency in Ireland, 1801–1885

- Former county constituency for the House of Commons
- County: County Meath

1801–1885
- Seats: 2
- Created from: County Meath (IHC)
- Replaced by: North Meath; South Meath

Meath was a parliamentary constituency in Ireland, which from 1801 to 1885 returned two Members of Parliament (MPs) to the House of Commons of the United Kingdom.

== Boundaries ==
This constituency comprised the whole of County Meath.

== Members of Parliament ==
Election	1st Member	1st Party	2nd Member	2nd Party
1801	Hamilton Gorges		Sir Marcus Somerville, 4th Baronet	Whig
1802	Thomas Cherburgh Bligh	Whig	Sir Marcus Somerville, 4th Baronet	Whig
1812	Thomas Taylour, Earl of Bective (later Marquess of Headfort)	Whig	Sir Marcus Somerville, 4th Baronet	Whig
Feb 1830	Arthur Plunkett, Baron Killeen, later Earl of Fingall	Whig	Sir Marcus Somerville, 4th Baronet	Whig
Aug 1831	Arthur Plunkett, Baron Killeen, later Earl of Fingall	Whig	Henry Grattan	Repeal Association
1832	Morgan O'Connell	Repeal Association	Henry Grattan	Repeal Association
Feb 1840	Matthew Corbally	Whig	Henry Grattan	Repeal Association
1841	Daniel O'Connell	Repeal Association	Henry Grattan	Repeal Association
Jun 1842	Matthew Corbally	Whig	Henry Grattan	Repeal Association
1852	Matthew Corbally	Ind. Irish	Frederick Lucas	Ind. Irish
1855	Matthew Corbally	Ind. Irish	Edward McEvoy	Ind. Irish
1859	Matthew Corbally	Liberal	Edward McEvoy	Liberal
1871	John Martin	Ind. Nationalist	Edward McEvoy	Liberal
1874	John Martin	Home Rule League	Nicholas Ennis	Home Rule League
1875	Charles Stewart Parnell	Home Rule League	Nicholas Ennis	Home Rule League
Apr 1880	Charles Stewart Parnell	Home Rule League	Robert Henry Metge	Home Rule League
May 1880	Alexander Martin Sullivan	Home Rule League	Robert Henry Metge	Home Rule League
Feb 1882	Michael Davitt	Home Rule League	Robert Henry Metge	Home Rule League
Apr 1882	Edward Sheil	Home Rule League	Robert Henry Metge	Home Rule League
Feb 1884	Edward Sheil	Home Rule League	William Meagher	Home Rule League
1885	Constituency divided: see South Meath and North Meath			

== Elections ==
=== Elections in the 1830s ===
Taylour succeeded to the peerage, becoming 2nd Marquess of Headfort and causing a by-election.

By-election, 22 February 1830: Meath
Party	Candidate	Votes	%
Whig	Arthur Plunkett	Unopposed	
Registered electors		977	
Whig hold			

General election 1830: Meath
Party	Candidate	Votes	%
Whig	Sir Marcus Somerville, 4th Baronet	Unopposed	
Whig	Arthur Plunkett	Unopposed	
Registered electors		977	
Whig hold			
Whig hold			

General election 1831: Meath
Party	Candidate	Votes	%
Whig	Arthur Plunkett	417	47.2
Whig	Sir Marcus Somerville, 4th Baronet	250	28.3
Repeal	Henry Grattan	198	22.4
Whig	James Lenox William Naper	10	1.1
Tory	Richard Rowley	8	0.9
Majority		52	5.9
Turnout		c. 442	c. 45.2
Registered electors		977	
Whig hold			
Whig hold			

Somerville's death caused a by-election.

By-election, 11 August 1831: Meath
Party	Candidate	Votes	%	±%
Repeal	Henry Grattan	309	67.3	+44.9
Whig	John Duncan Bligh	150	32.7	−43.9
Majority		159	34.6	N/A
Turnout		459	47.0	c. +1.8
Registered electors		977		
Repeal gain from Whig		Swing	+44.4	

General election 1832: Meath
Party	Candidate	Votes	%
Repeal	Henry Grattan	Unopposed	
Repeal	Morgan O'Connell	Unopposed	
Registered electors		1,520	
Repeal gain from Whig			
Repeal gain from Whig			

General election 1835: Meath
Party	Candidate	Votes	%
Repeal (Whig)	Morgan O'Connell	838	35.7
Repeal (Whig)	Henry Grattan	826	35.2
Conservative	Randal Plunkett	346	14.7
Conservative	Gustavus Lambert	337	14.4
Majority		480	20.5
Turnout		c. 1,174	c. 72.6
Registered electors		1,617	
Repeal hold			
Repeal hold			

General election 1837: Meath
Party	Candidate	Votes	%
Repeal (Whig)	Morgan O'Connell	Unopposed	
Repeal (Whig)	Henry Grattan	Unopposed	
Registered electors		1,872	
Repeal hold			
Repeal hold			

=== Elections in the 1840s ===
O'Connell resigned after being appointed assistant registrar of deeds, causing a by-election.

By-election, 4 February 1840: Meath
Party	Candidate	Votes	%	±%
Whig	Matthew Corbally	Unopposed		
Whig gain from Repeal				

General election 1841: Meath
Party	Candidate	Votes	%	±%
Repeal	Daniel O'Connell	Unopposed		
Repeal	Henry Grattan	Unopposed		
Registered electors		1,236		
Repeal hold				
Repeal hold				

O'Connell was also elected for County Cork and opted to sit there, causing a by-election.

By-election, 10 June 1842: Meath
Party	Candidate	Votes	%	±%
Whig	Matthew Corbally	Unopposed		
Whig gain from Repeal				

General election 1847: Meath
Party	Candidate	Votes	%	±%
Whig	Matthew Corbally	598	41.8	N/A
Repeal	Henry Grattan	503	35.1	N/A
Conservative	Henry Corbet Singleton	331	23.1	New
Turnout		716 (est)	44.4 (est)	N/A
Registered electors		1,611		
Majority		95	6.7	N/A
Whig gain from Repeal		Swing	N/A	
Majority		172	12.0	N/A
Repeal hold		Swing	N/A	

=== Elections in the 1850s ===
General election 1852: Meath
Party	Candidate	Votes	%	±%
Independent Irish	Frederick Lucas	2,004	44.2	N/A
Independent Irish	Matthew Corbally	1,968	43.4	+1.6
Independent Irish	Henry Grattan	565	12.5	−22.6
Majority		1,403	30.9	N/A
Turnout		2,269 (est)	53.8 (est)	+9.4
Registered electors		4,218		
Independent Irish gain from Repeal		Swing	N/A	
Independent Irish gain from Whig		Swing	N/A	

Lucas' death caused a by-election.

By-election, 17 December 1855: Meath
Party	Candidate	Votes	%	±%
Independent Irish	Edward McEvoy	1,639	64.6	N/A
Whig	Henry Meredyth	899	35.4	New
Majority		740	29.2	−1.7
Turnout		2,538	60.2	+6.4
Registered electors		4,218		
Independent Irish hold		Swing	N/A	

General election 1857: Meath
Party	Candidate	Votes	%	±%
Independent Irish	Matthew Corbally	Unopposed		
Independent Irish	Edward McEvoy	Unopposed		
Registered electors		4,177		
Independent Irish hold				
Independent Irish hold				

General election 1859: Meath
Party	Candidate	Votes	%	±%
Liberal	Matthew Corbally	Unopposed		
Liberal	Edward McEvoy	Unopposed		
Registered electors		4,383		
Liberal hold				
Liberal hold				

=== Elections in the 1860s ===
General election 1865: Meath
Party	Candidate	Votes	%	±%
Liberal	Matthew Corbally	Unopposed		
Liberal	Edward McEvoy	Unopposed		
Registered electors		4,155		
Liberal hold				
Liberal hold				

General election 1868: Meath
Party	Candidate	Votes	%	±%
Liberal	Matthew Corbally	1,696	49.3	N/A
Liberal	Edward McEvoy	1,655	48.1	N/A
Liberal	John Thomas Hinds	88	2.6	N/A
Majority		1,567	45.5	N/A
Turnout		1,720 (est)	42.8 (est)	N/A
Registered electors		4,018		
Liberal hold		Swing	N/A	
Liberal hold		Swing	N/A	

=== Elections in the 1870s ===
Corbally's death caused a by-election.

By-election, 17 Jan 1871: Meath
Party	Candidate	Votes	%	±%
Ind. Nationalist	John Martin	1,140	62.5	New
Conservative	George John Plunkett	684	37.5	New
Majority		456	25.0	N/A
Turnout		1,824	43.6	+0.8
Registered electors		4,179		
Ind. Nationalist gain from Liberal		Swing	N/A	

General election 1874: Meath
Party	Candidate	Votes	%	±%
Home Rule	Nicholas Ennis	1,716	38.8	N/A
Home Rule	John Martin	1,709	38.7	N/A
Conservative	James Lennox Napier	992	22.5	N/A
Majority		717	16.2	N/A
Turnout		2,705 (est)	66.5 (est)	+23.7
Registered electors		4,069		
Home Rule gain from Liberal		Swing	N/A	
Home Rule gain from Ind. Nationalist		Swing	N/A	

Martin's death caused a by-election.

By-election, 17 Apr 1875: Meath
Party	Candidate	Votes	%	±%
Home Rule	Charles Stewart Parnell	1,771	62.8	−14.7
Conservative	James Lennox Napier	912	32.3	+9.8
Home Rule	John Thomas Hinds	138	4.9	N/A
Majority		859	30.5	+14.3
Turnout		2,821	68.2	+1.7
Registered electors		4,139		
Home Rule hold		Swing	−12.3	

=== Elections in the 1880s ===
General election 1880: Meath
Party	Candidate	Votes	%	±%
Parnellite Home Rule League	Charles Stewart Parnell	2,283	45.2	+6.4
Home Rule	Robert Henry Metge	2,252	44.6	+5.9
Conservative	Henry Lorton Bourke	514	10.2	−12.3
Majority		1,738	34.4	+18.2
Turnout		2,797 (est)	72.1 (est)	+5.6
Registered electors		3,877		
Home Rule hold		Swing	+6.3	
Home Rule hold		Swing	+6.0	

Parnell was also elected MP for Cork City and opted to sit there, causing a by-election.

By-election, 20 May 1880: Meath
Party	Candidate	Votes	%	±%
Home Rule	Alexander Martin Sullivan	Unopposed		
Registered electors		3,877		
Home Rule hold				

Sullivan resigned, causing a by-election.

By-election, 22 Feb 1882: Meath
Party	Candidate	Votes	%	±%
Home Rule	Michael Davitt	Unopposed		
Registered electors		3,711		
Home Rule hold				

Davitt was disqualified because he was in prison, causing a by-election.

By-election, 14 Apr 1882: Meath
Party	Candidate	Votes	%	±%
Home Rule	Edward Sheil	Unopposed		
Registered electors		3,711		
Home Rule hold				

Metge resigned, causing a by-election.

By-election, 21 Feb 1884: Meath
Party	Candidate	Votes	%	±%
Home Rule	William Meagher	Unopposed		
Registered electors		3,660		
Home Rule hold				
