= Morgan O'Connell =

Irish soldier and politician

Morgan O'Connell (31 October 1804 – 20 January 1885), soldier, politician and son of Daniel O'Connell, the Liberator of Ireland . He served in the Irish South American legion and the Austrian army. He was MP for County Meath from 1832 until 1840 and afterwards assistant-registrar of deeds for Ireland from 1840 until 1868. He did not agree with his father on the repeal question, but fought a duel with Lord Arden, on his father's account.

== Biography ==
O'Connell, second son of Daniel O'Connell, was born at 30 Merrion Square, Dublin, 31 October 1804. In 1819, self-styled General John Devereux came to Dublin to enlist military aid for Simón Bolívar's army to liberate Venezuela from Spanish rule. He succeeded in forming an Irish Legion, to be part of Bolivar's British Legions; and O'Connell, encouraged by his father, was one of the officers who purchased a commission in it even though only 15 years old. The enterprise was mismanaged; there was no commissariat organisation on board the ships, and a part of the force died on the voyage. The remainder were disembarked on the Spanish Main at Margarita Island, where many deaths took place from starvation eight days after the Irish mutineers left for Jamaica. Bolivar, who had noted his pleasure at the departure of "these vile mercenaries", was too astute a diplomat to offend the son of his Irish counterpart. Morgan was accorded the appropriate privileges of his rank, and toasts were drunk to the health of his father, the "most enlightened man in all Europe". A portion of the expedition, under Francis O' Connor, effected an alliance with Bolivar, and to the energy of these allies the republican successes were chiefly due.

Bolivar made sure that the untrained Irish lad stayed out of danger. "I have numberless hardships to go through," said Bolivar, "which I would not bring him into, for the character of his father is well known to me." But ceremonial duties soon bored the restless young Irishman, and after a year at Bolivar's headquarters Morgan left for Ireland.

If South America did not satisfy Morgan's taste for adventure, he had more than his fill on the return journey. He survived a bout of tropical fever, and was shipwrecked twice in succession, ending up stranded in Cuba. A schooner captain, who turned out to be a long-lost Irish cousin, rescued him. After the captain was killed in a fight with his boatswain, Morgan hitched a ride to Jamaica on a Danish ship commanded by a skipper from Cork. From Jamaica, another Irish officer offered Morgan passage home on a British Islands.

Arriving in January 1822, Morgan was greeted by his proud father as a prodigal son returned. His South American adventure, declared Daniel O'Connell, had made a man of Morgan. Otherwise, said O'Connell, "it would have been difficult to tame him down to the sobriety of business."

O'Connell after his return to Ireland again to seek foreign service in the Austrian army.

On 19 December 1832 he entered parliament in the Liberal interest, as one of the members for County Meath, and continued to represent that constituency till January 1840, when he was appointed first assistant-registrar of deeds for Ireland, at a salary of £1,200 a year, a place which he held till 1868. In politics he was never in perfect accord with his father, and his retirement from parliament was probably caused by his inability to accept the Repeal movement. During his parliamentary career he fought a duel with Lord William Arden, 2nd Baron Alvanley, a captain in the British Army, at Chalk Farm, on 4 May 1835. A challenge had been sent by Alvanley to O'Connell's father, who, in accordance with a vow he had made after shooting D'Esterre, declined the meeting. Morgan thereupon took up the challenge. Two shots each were exchanged, but no one was hurt. He afterwards, in December 1835, received a challenge from Benjamin Disraeli, in consequence of an attack made on Disraeli by Morgan's father. Morgan declined to meet Disraeli.

== Family ==
Morgan O'Connell was one of seven children (and the second of four sons) of the Irish Nationalist leader Daniel and Mary O'Connell. His brothers Maurice, John and Daniel were also MPs.

O'Connell married, on 23 July 1840, Kate Mary, youngest daughter of Michael Balfe of South Park, County Roscommon. He died at 12 St. Stephen's Green, Dublin, 20 January 1885, and was buried in Glasnevin cemetery on 23 January.

== See also ==
- O'Connell of Derrynane

== Notes ==
Parliament of the United Kingdom
Preceded by Arthur Plunkett, Baron Killeen	Member of Parliament for County Meath; 1832–1840; With: Henry Grattan Jnr 1831–1842	Succeeded by Matthew Corbally
