= Frederick Lucas =

British religious polemicist

Frederick Lucas (30 March 1812 – 22 October 1855) was a British religious polemicist and founder of The Tablet. His brother Samuel Lucas was a newspaper editor and abolitionist.

== Biography ==
He was born in Westminster, the second son of Samuel Hayhurst Lucas, a London corn-merchant, who was a member of the Society of Friends. He was educated at a Quaker school in Darlington, and then at University College London. He studied law at Middle Temple, and was called to the bar in 1835. Lucas converted to Catholicism in 1839.

In 1840, Lucas founded The Tablet, published in London, a progressive international Catholic weekly newspaper, just 11 years before the restoration of the Catholic hierarchy in England and Wales. It is the second oldest surviving weekly journal in Britain after The Spectator (which was founded in 1828).

After establishing the Irish Tenant Right League with Charles Gavan Duffy in 1850, he was elected as member of parliament (MP) for County Meath in 1852. After failing in a complaint-mission to Rome on behalf of the league, Lucas died in October 1855 at Staines, Middlesex, and is buried in Brompton Cemetery, London.

== Editorial history of The Tablet ==
The first issue of The Tablet appeared on 16 May 1840, with financial support from the Keasley brothers, two Catholic leather merchants. The newspaper's early editorial policy emphasised the defence of Catholic interests and criticised religious discrimination. Its first issue included a letter of support from Irish political leader Daniel O'Connell.

A dispute over the newspaper's ownership resulted in two competing publications in the early 1840s. Lucas continued publishing under the title The True Tablet, while a rival version was produced under the editorship of Michael Joseph Quin. The competing publication eventually ceased, and Lucas's newspaper resumed its original title in 1843.

== Notes ==
Parliament of the United Kingdom
Preceded by Henry Grattan; Matthew Corbally	Member of Parliament for County Meath; 1852 – 1855; With: Matthew Corbally	Succeeded by Edward McEvoy; Matthew Corbally
