= Charles Dawson (Irish politician) =

Irish nationalist politician (1842–1917)

Member of Parliament
- In office 1880–1885
- Preceded by: Henry Owen Lewis
- Succeeded by: Constituency abolished
- Constituency: Carlow

Lord Mayor of Dublin
- In office 1882–1884
- Preceded by: George Moyers
- Succeeded by: William Meagher

Personal details
- Born: 1842
- Died: 17 March 1917 (aged 74–75)
- Party: Home Rule League

Charles Dawson (1842 – 17 March 1917) was an Irish nationalist politician and a member of parliament (MP) for Carlow from 1880 to 1885.

Born in Limerick, he was educated at Belvedere College and the Catholic University of Ireland. He was a member of Dublin Corporation in 1877 to 1884. He was Lord Mayor of Dublin from 1882 to 1884. During his tenure as Lord Mayor, on 15 August 1882 he officiated at the unveiling of the O'Connell Monument on Sackville Street, which was received "with much splendour".

He was elected as a Home Rule League MP for Carlow Borough at the 1880 general election. The Carlow Borough was abolished at the 1885 general election and Dawson chose to leave parliament to concentrate on his business activities.

In 1873, Dawson married Katherine Carroll of Limerick city; they had four sons.

Parliament of the United Kingdom
Preceded by Henry Owen Lewis	Member of Parliament for Carlow; 1880–1885	Constituency abolished
Civic offices
Preceded by George Moyers	Lord Mayor of Dublin; 1882–1884	Succeeded by William Meagher
