= 1871 County Meath by-election =

UK Parliamentary by-election

The 1871 County Meath by-election was fought on 17 January 1871. The by-election was fought due to the Death of the incumbent MP of the Liberal Party, Matthew Corbally. It was won by the Home Rule candidate John Martin.

Martin was elected by a margin of 2–1 as the first Home Rule MP representing Meath, representing first Isaac Butt's Home Government Association and from November 1873 the Home Rule League. This was unusual for a Protestant in a Catholic constituency, and is a measure of the popular esteem Martin was held in, he was commonly known as "Honest John Martin". He retained his seat in the February 1874 general election as one of 60 Home Rule members.
