= Lillian Metge =

Anglo-Irish suffragette and women's rights campaigner

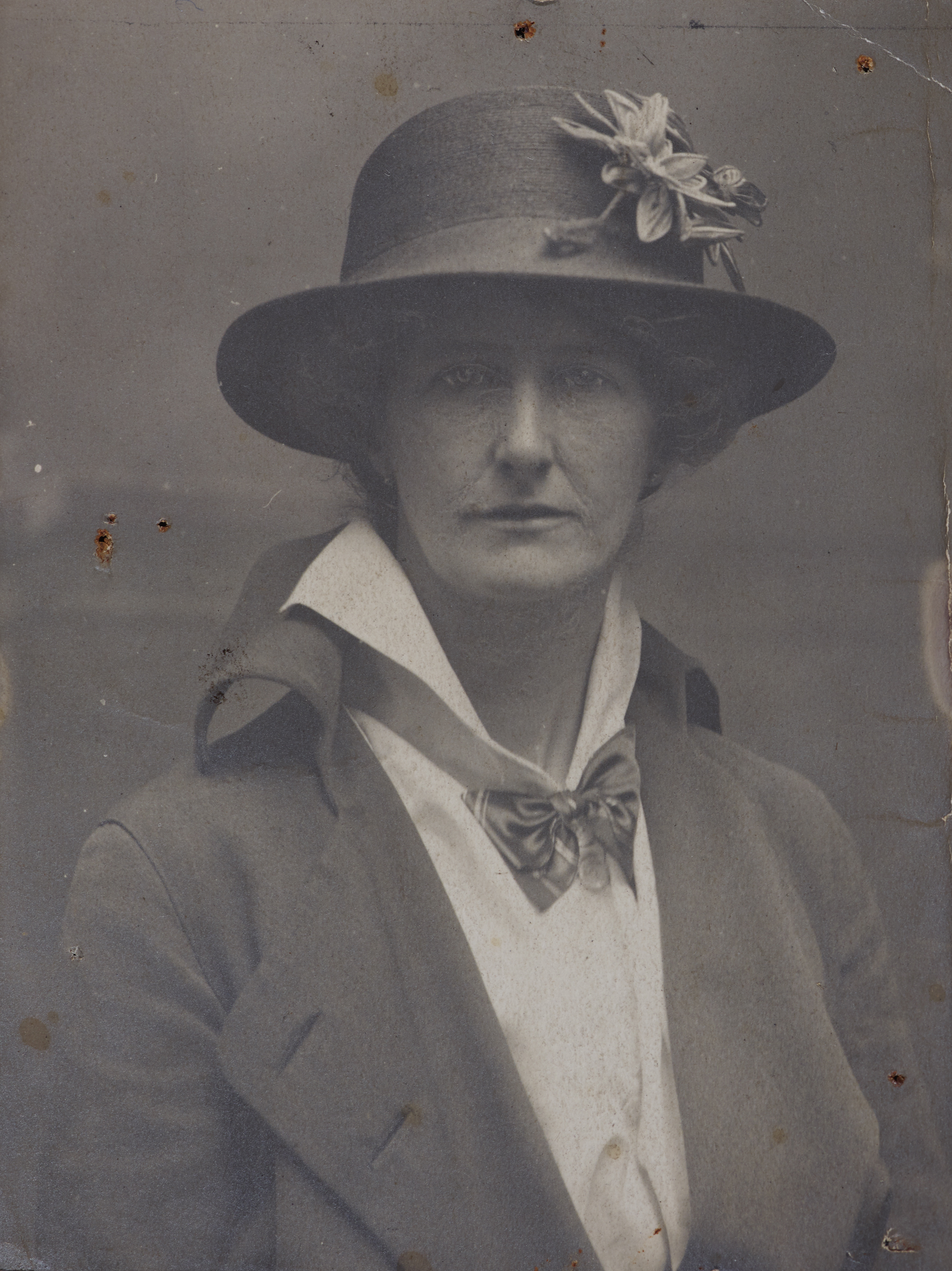
- Born: Lillian Margaret Grubb; 22 June 1871; Belfast, Ireland
- Died: 10 May 1954 (aged 82); Dublin, Ireland
- Burial place: Deansgrange Cemetery, Dublin, Ireland
- Known for: Bombing Lisburn Cathedral
- Movement: Suffragette
- Spouse(s): Captain Robert Henry Metge, MP for County Meath (m. 1892; died 1900)
- Children: 2
- Parents: Richard Cambridge Grubb (father); Harriet Richardson (mother)
- Awards: Hunger Strike Medal 'for Valour'

Lillian Margaret Metge (née Grubb; 22 June 1871 – 10 May 1954) was an Anglo-Irish suffragette and women's rights campaigner. She founded the Lisburn Suffrage Society, which she left to become a militant activist, leading on an explosion at the Anglican Lisburn Cathedral in Ireland. She was imprisoned briefly, and awarded a Women's Social and Political Union Hunger Strike medal. She continued her campaign, albeit peacefully, during and after World War I.

== Personal life ==
Born Lillian Margaret Grubb in Belfast, Ireland on 22 June 1871 her parents were linen merchant Richard Cambridge Grubb of Cahir Abbey, County Tipperary and Killeaton House, County Antrim and his wife, Harriet Richardson. She had two brothers, Cameron and Richard. The latter of whom became a veterinary surgeon. She was born into a wealthy family who made their fortunes from the linen industry.

She married in 1892, becoming the second wife of Captain Robert Henry Metge who was an MP for Meath and also a magistrate.

Robert and Lillian Metge had two daughters, Lillian Gwendoline Cole Metge (known as "Gwendoline") and Dorothy Elise Cole Metge. Robert Metge died on 19 September 1900 before Lillian became involved in the militant suffragette activities. Gwendoline Metge committed suicide in 1920.

By 1921, Metge had been living in Seymour Street, Lisburn, then in England at Shrewsbury briefly, then Dublin, where she died on 10 May 1954.

Metge's personality was described as 'tall straight backed and stern'.

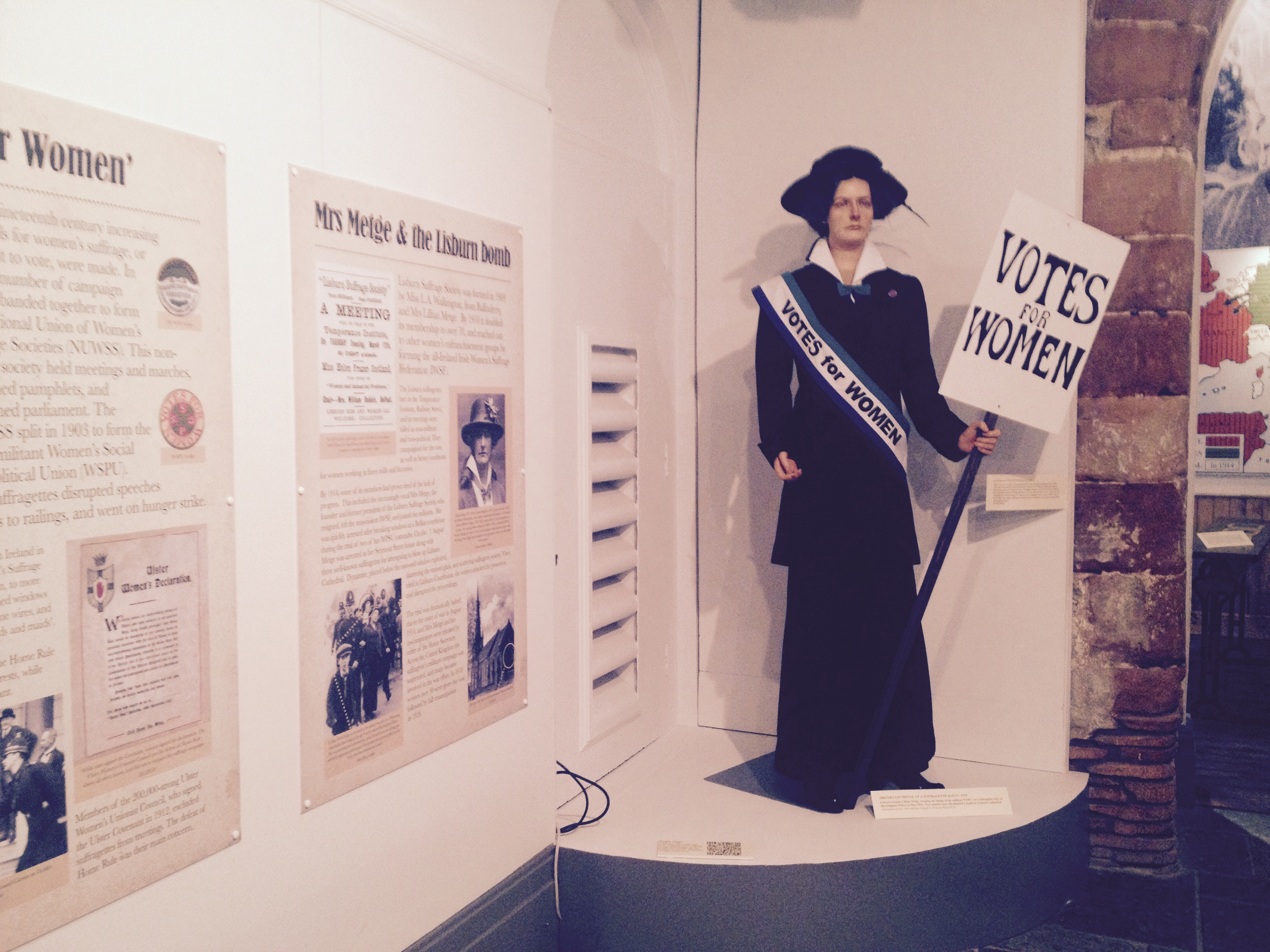
Lillian Metge mannequin at Lisburn

== Suffragette activism ==
Metge became interested in pressing for the right to vote as neither her financial status nor education was enough, as she was a woman, and she became involved in being active for women's rights. In Ulster, this interest among liberal middle-class women in social changes went across the Nationalist/Unionist divide and the aim for improvements across social classes.

Despite that, there was a view among many Ulstermen that women were not able to manage the complex politics of Ulster and Home Rule and so should not be allowed to vote, and that it was not a general demand, but just came from an active few. Some local women's groups were content with aiming for the same property requirements as men rather than for universal suffrage. Metge's own views on these matters were not clearly recorded.

Metge founded the Lisburn Suffrage Society and was its president and secretary at different times. There were a number of Irish and Ulster suffrage groups, and attempts to unite their efforts. Metge wrote articles for the Irish Women's Suffrage Federation (IWSF) movement's newsletter, the Irish Citizen.

In 1913, Metge represented the IWSF at the International Women's Congress, held in Budapest. In 1913, the IWSF considered whether it would be a militant group. In April 1914, Metge left both IWSF and the Lisburn society over some 'administrative' issues, and made a speech stating her intent to be militant, as to do otherwise would be a dishonour to the vision in which she believed.

In May 1913, she was part of the large group of women who charged at King George V outside Buckingham Palace and were reportedly beaten by the police.

In July 1913, she was at the Belfast trial of Dorothy Evans and Madge Muir, and then was arrested herself for throwing stones at the court windows. Metge helped look after Evans, released early on 26 July for health reasons, during Evans's hunger strike in Tullamore prison. Metge, on one occasion, possibly bought 'green and white' shoes for her fellow Irish suffragette, Hanna Sheehy-Skeffington.

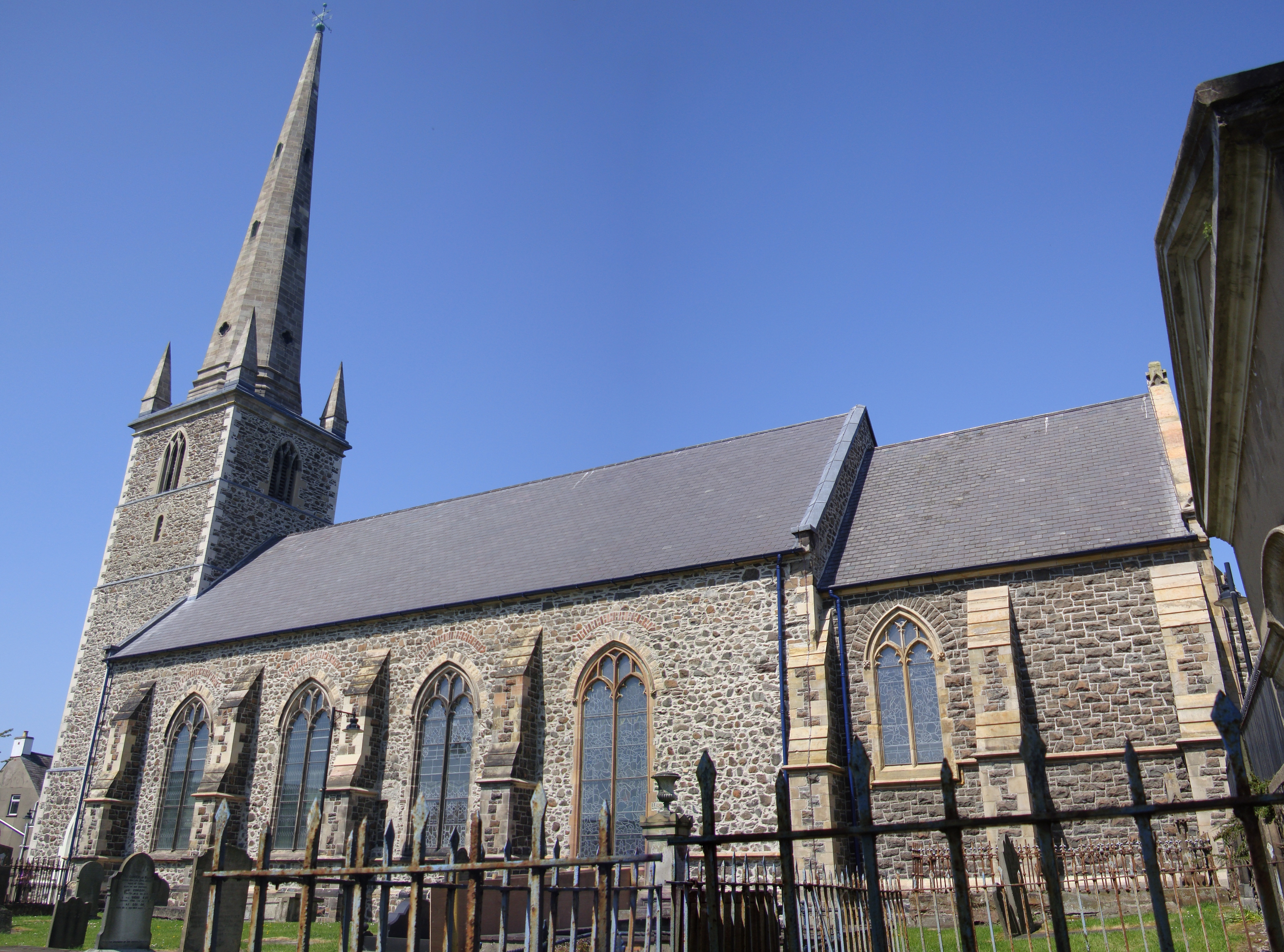
Lisburn Cathedral, site of the explosion

On 31 July 1914, Metge, carried out a plan to bomb the Anglican Lisburn Cathedral, with a Miss D. Carson, Maud Wickham, and Dorothy Evans. The explosion woke the town in the dead of night. An Ulster Volunteer Force quartermaster's wife, Lillian Spender, initially thought it was a big gun, later when she found out it was suffragettes she said 'suffragettes – the brutes!' and called Metge a 'mad militant'. The dynamite blew out the oldest stained glass chancel window in the Church of Ireland Cathedral, which outraged some local people.

The police had initially gone to the gasworks, thinking that had blown up, but then at the cathedral they found the damage to the window, and suffragette leaflets lying about among the broken glass and rubble.

Metge was a suspect, due to her known militant position, and also as the women's footprints had made a muddy trail straight to the rear of Metge's house. Metge and her co-conspirators were arrested at 8 am the next day, but had to have police protection as they were taken into custody, as bottles, stones and mud was thrown and the house windows were broken.

Any local sympathy was further lost when the government stated they would raise local (tax) rates to cover the cost of repairing the Cathedral's damage.

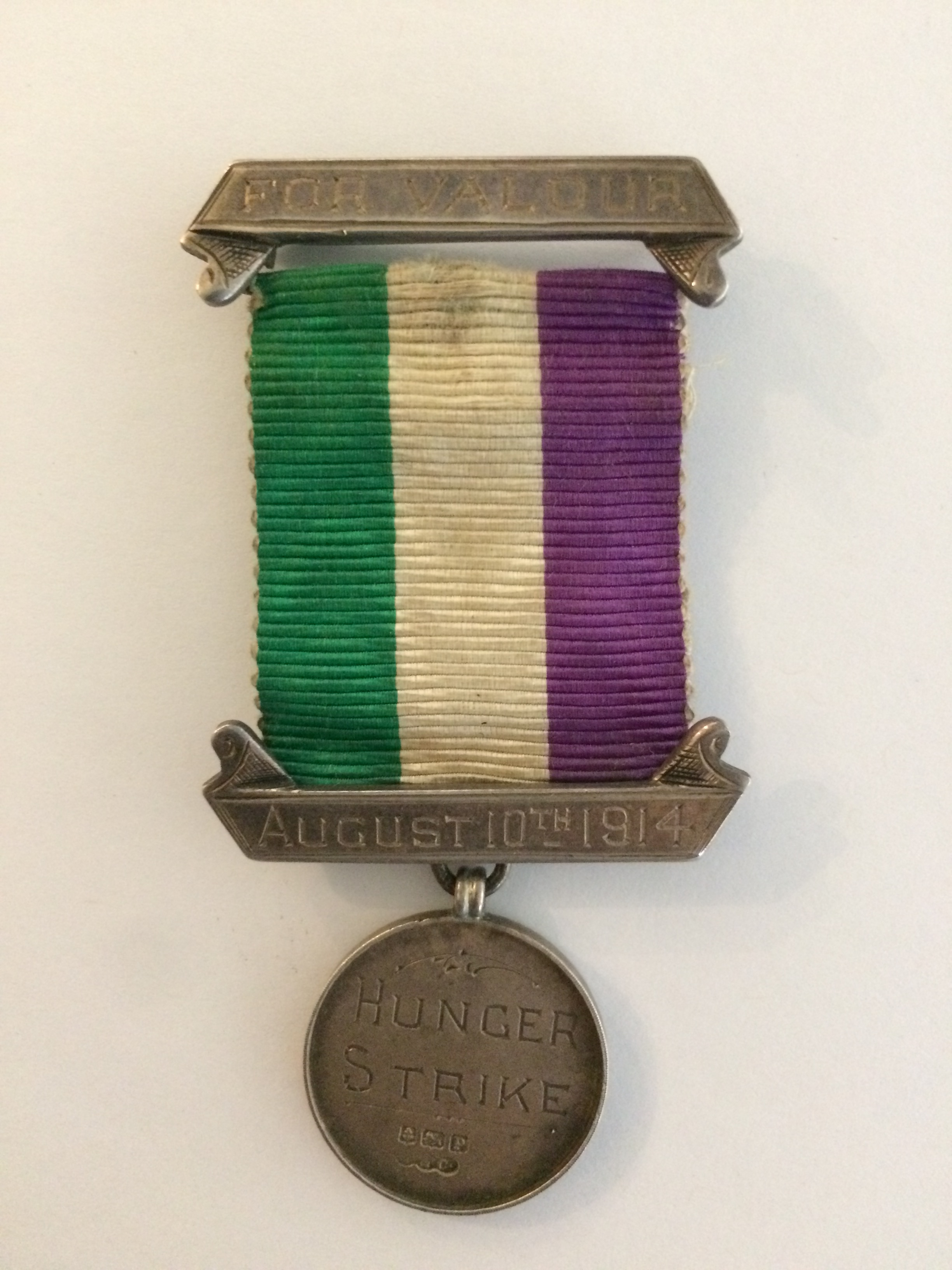
Lillian Metge's Hunger Strike Medal 1914

Metge and the others were taken to Crumlin Road Prison and went on hunger strike. Metge was awarded a Hunger Strike Medal "for Valour" by the WSPU, with its green white and purple ribbon, and a date on the bar of 10 August 1914.

Metge's Hunger Strike Medal is now held in the Lisburn Museum.

== Trial and release ==
At Metge's and the others' trial, as well as the police finding the footsteps trail and a linen handkerchief from the scene, further evidence was presented, including four sets of muddy boots and damp coats with spent fuse matches in their pockets at Metge's house. A local shopkeeper gave evidence that Mrs Metge had asked to buy dynamite a few months previously saying it was 'to blow up a tree in her garden'.

As at other suffragette court appearances, the women on trial did not co-operate with the court, shouting out, making long speeches for their cause, pushing the police, and at one stage 13 policemen were involved in holding the four women back, as an apple was thrown at the Crown Prosecutor, Mr Moorhead, who said the throw 'wasn't bad ... for a woman'.

Metge demanded to be released saying 'there is one law for women and another for men. A woman could not get justice here'. Despite the strong evidence, the women were never sentenced as the UK Home Secretary had intervened in the 'votes for women' campaign, which WSPU had said was being stood down due to imminent war (as World War I was about to break out) and all court actions against suffragettes stopped and the women already imprisoned were released. but Metge's release was also conditional on her taking no further activism.

== Later life ==
Metge pursued peaceful campaigning for women's rights during the War, writing for the Citizen and working with the Irish Suffrage and British Women's Social and Political Union leaders. She led a Women's Freedom League campaign in the North East of England, launched at the Bigg Market in Newcastle, bringing Ada Broughton as keynote speaker, on the issue of Temperance, when the law (known as the Hartlepool restriction) stopped 'the sober sex' drinking in bars but would not consider total prohibition. Dorothy Evans also talked at Gosforth and I.L.P. on 'the duty of civil disobedience', and they had newly-released Emily Davison collecting for the women's suffrage cause.

Some women were granted the right to vote after the War in 1918, and Metge gave up her activism in 1920 (not long after her daughter Gwendoline committed suicide). She moved from Lisburn to Shrewsbury for a while, then went to live in Dublin.

Metge was left a gold watch in the will of Dorothy Evans, which had originally been given by 'Belfast suffragette friends', when Evans died in 1944.

Metge herself died on 10 May 1954 in Dublin. She is buried in Deansgrange Cemetery, Dublin.

== See also ==
- Irish Women's Suffrage Society
- Suffragette bombing and arson campaign
- List of suffragists and suffragettes including more on different suffrage societies in Ireland
- List of suffragette bombings
- Women's suffrage in the United Kingdom
- Hunger Strike Medal
- The Irish Citizen
