= George Moyers =

Irish architect and politician (1836–1916

Lord Mayor of Dublin
- In office 1881–1882
- Preceded by: Edmund Dwyer Gray
- Succeeded by: Charles Dawson

Personal details
- Born: 11 May 1836
- Died: 4 November 1916 (aged 80)
- Party: Irish Conservative Party
- Education: Trinity College Dublin

Sir George Moyers (11 May 1836 – 4 November 1916) was an Anglo-Irish architect, engineer and politician.

Moyers was the son of William Moyers. He was educated at Bellevue House, Bristol and Trinity College Dublin, graduating in 1856. He did a five-year architectural apprenticeship with his brother-in-law, Edward Henry Carson (father of Edward Carson), and worked in London for the engineers George Legg and William Dempsey. By 1863, he had taken over his father's building contractor business in South Richmond Street, Dublin. In 1891 he opened a new architecture and civil engineering business with his son, Lambert Moyers, in Foster Place.

From 1875 he was a Justice of the Peace for Dublin and was later made a Deputy Lieutenant for the city. He was elected an alderman for the Southside, Dublin in 1880 and was elected Lord Mayor of Dublin as a Conservative in 1881. He was knighted in the 1887 Golden Jubilee Honours. He was the last Irish Conservative Party lord mayor of Dublin.

Civic offices
Preceded by Edmund Dwyer Gray	Lord Mayor of Dublin; 1881–1882	Succeeded by Charles Dawson
