= Suffragette bombing and arson campaign =

1912–14 campaign orchestrated by British suffragettes

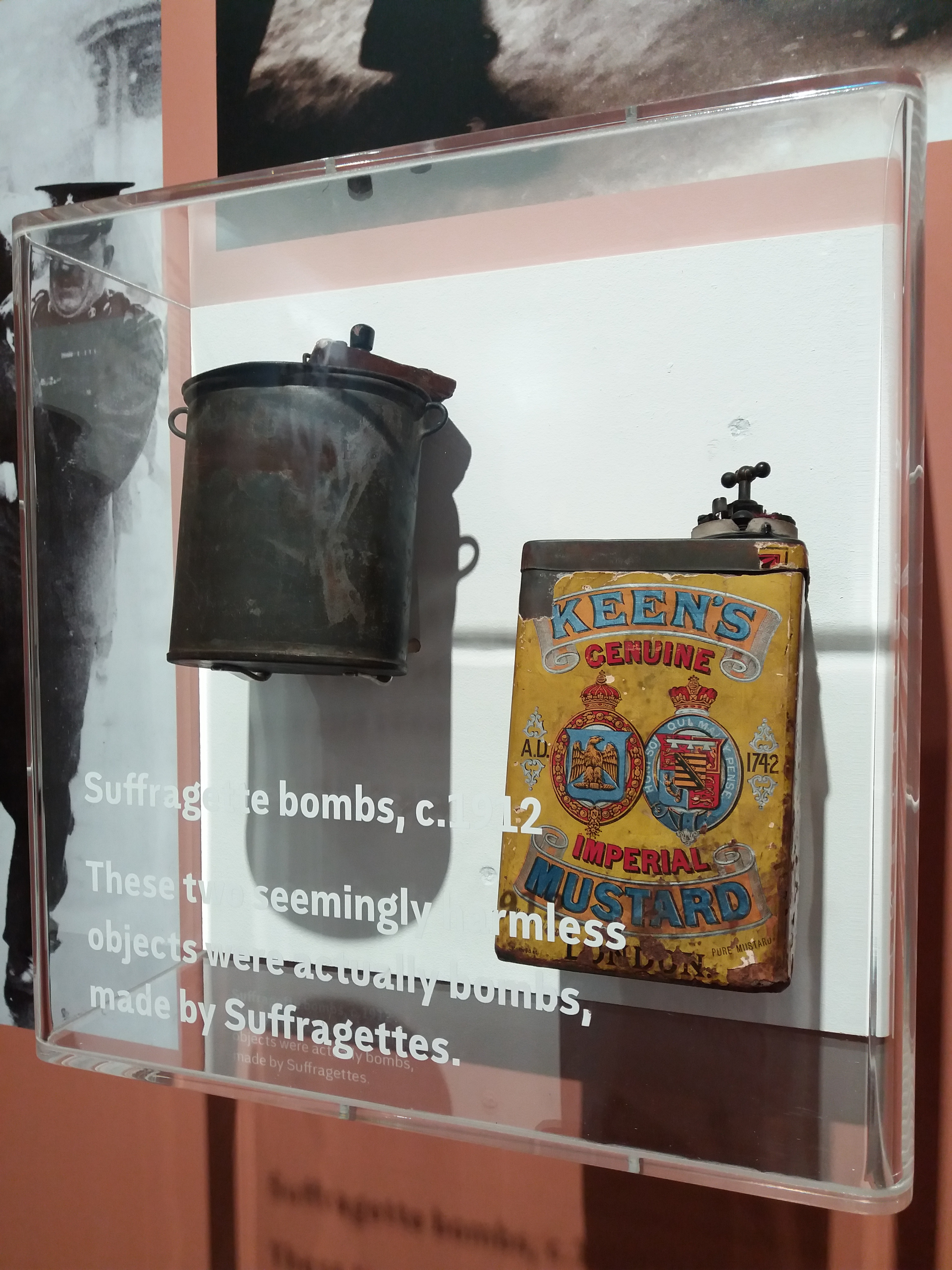
- Two suffragette bombs, which were defused before they could detonate, on display at the City of London Police Museum in 2019
- Type: Single-issue terrorism (§ Classification as terrorism)
- Location: United Kingdom (including Ireland)
- Target: Government, infrastructure, churches, the public
- Objective: Achieve votes for women
- Date: June 1912 – August 1914
- Executed by: Women's Social and Political Union (WSPU)
- Outcome: Stalemate, outbreak of World War I halts campaign
- Casualties: 4+ killed (including one suffragette); 24+ injured (including two suffragettes)

Suffragettes in Great Britain and Ireland orchestrated a bombing and arson campaign between the years 1912 and 1914. The campaign was instigated by the Women's Social and Political Union (WSPU), and was a part of their wider campaign for women's suffrage. The campaign, led by key WSPU figures such as Emmeline Pankhurst, targeted infrastructure, government, churches and the general public, and saw the use of improvised explosive devices, arson, letter bombs, assassination attempts and other forms of direct action and violence.

At least four people were killed in the attacks, and at least 24 were injured (including two suffragettes). The campaign was halted at the outbreak of war in August 1914 without having brought about votes for women, as suffragettes pledged to pause the campaign to aid the war effort.

Both suffragettes and the authorities of the time described the arson and bomb attacks as a terrorist campaign. Contemporaneous press reports also referred to attacks as terrorist incidents in both the United Kingdom and in the United States. Historians have also classified the campaign as one involving terrorist acts, such as C. J. Bearman, Rachel Monaghan and feminist historians Fern Riddell and Cheryl Jorgensen-Earp.

== Background ==
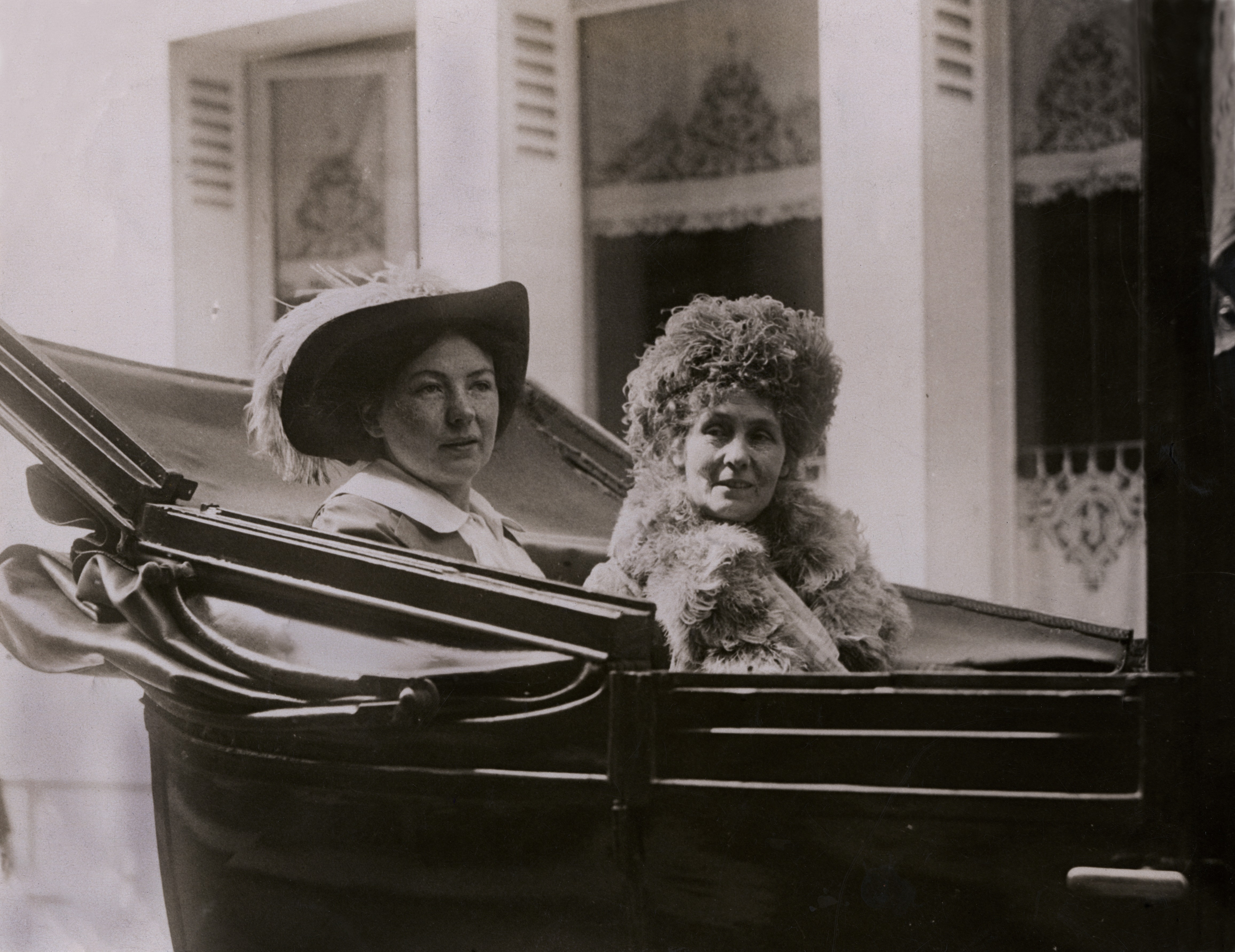
Emmeline and Christabel Pankhurst

Multiple suffrage societies formed across Britain during the Victorian era, all campaigning for women's suffrage - with only certain men being able to vote in parliamentary elections at the time. In the years leading up to the First World War, "suffragettes" had become the popular name for members of a new organisation, the Women's Social and Political Union (WSPU). Founded in 1903 by Emmeline Pankhurst and her daughters, the Union used direct action to pursue women's suffrage. This was indicated by the Union's adoption of the motto "deeds, not words".

After decades of peaceful protest, the WSPU believed more radical action was needed to get the government to listen to the campaign for women's rights. From 1905 the WSPU's activities became increasingly militant and its members were increasingly willing to break the law by inflicting damage upon property and people. WSPU supporters raided Parliament, physically assaulted politicians and smashed the windows of government buildings. In one instance, a suffragette assaulted future prime minister Winston Churchill with a horse whip on the platform at Bristol railway station. However, before 1911, the WSPU made only sporadic use of violence, and it was directed almost exclusively at the government and civil servants. The WSPU was not the only militant suffragette group. The Women's Freedom League attacked ballot boxes at the 1909 Bermondsey by-election with acid, blinding the returning officer in one eye and causing severe burns to the Liberal agent's neck.

Emily Davison, a suffragette who later became infamous after she was killed by the King's horse at the 1913 Epsom Derby, was responsible for several attacks in London in December 1911, but such attacks were uncommon for the time. On 8 December, Davison attempted to set fire to the busy post office in Fleet Street with a burning, kerosene-soaked cloth enclosed within an envelope, but the intended fire did not take hold. Six days later, Davison set fire to two pillar boxes in the City of London, before again attempting to set fire to a post office in Parliament Street, but was arrested during the act and imprisoned.

After 1911, suffragette violence was directed increasingly at commercial concerns and then at the general public. This violence was encouraged by the leadership of the WSPU. In particular, the daughter of WSPU leader Emmeline Pankhurst, Christabel Pankhurst, actively planned a self-described "reign of terror". Emmeline Pankhurst stated that the aim of the campaign was "to make England and every department of English life insecure and unsafe".

== The campaign ==
=== Start of the campaign ===
In June and July 1912, five serious incidents signified the beginning of the campaign in earnest: the homes of three anti-suffrage cabinet ministers were attacked, a powerful bomb was planted in the Home Secretary's office and the Theatre Royal, Dublin, was set aflame and bombed while an audience attended a performance. One of the most dangerous attacks committed by the suffragettes, the attack on the Theatre Royal on 19 July, was carried out by Mary Leigh, Gladys Evans, Sarah Jane Baines under the pseudonym 'Lizzie Baker', and Mabel Capper, who attempted to set fire to the building during a packed lunchtime matinee attended by prime minister H. H. Asquith. A canister of gunpowder was left close to the stage and petrol and lit matches were thrown into the projection booth, which contained highly combustible film reels; it exploded as the audience, including Asquith, left the theatre. Earlier that day, Leigh hurled a hatchet towards Asquith, which narrowly missed, instead cutting Irish MP John Redmond on the ear. The four suffragettes who carried out the attack on the Theatre Royal were subsequently charged with offences likely to endanger life.

Arson attacks continued for the rest of 1912. Also vandalism attacks such as the damage to the royal Balmoral golf course having hole flags replaced with purple suffragette slogans against the Cabinet ministers, and vandalism to the memorial fountain on the Ballater to Braemar road, also attracted press attention.

On 25 October, Hugh Franklin set fire to his train carriage as it pulled into Harrow station. He was arrested and charged with endangering the safety of passengers. On 28 November, post boxes were booby trapped across Great Britain, starting a 5-day long pillar box sabotage campaign, with dangerous chemicals being poured into some boxes. In London, meanwhile, many letters ignited while in transit at post offices, and paraffin and lit matches were also put in pillar boxes. On 29 November, a bystander was assaulted with a whip at Aberdeen railway station by Emily Davison, as she believed the man was politician David Lloyd George in disguise. On 17 December, railway signals at Potters Bar were tied together and disabled by suffragettes with the intention of endangering train journeys.

The increasing number of arson attacks and acts of criminal damage was criticised by some members of the WSPU, and in October 1912 two long-standing supporters, Emmeline Pethick-Lawrence and Frederick Pethick-Lawrence, were expelled from the Union for voicing such objections. In November 1912, a car thought to be carrying the Chancellor of the Exchequer David Lloyd George in Aberdeen was attacked by a woman, who jumped on the running board and struck the window with a stone. By the end of the year, 240 people had been sent to prison for militant suffragette activities.

Christabel Pankhurst set up a new weekly WSPU newspaper at this time named The Suffragette. The newspaper devoted double-page spreads to reporting the bomb and arson attacks now regularly occurring across the country. This became the method by which the organisation claimed responsibility for each attack. Independent press also began to publish weekly round-ups of the attacks, with some newspapers such as the Gloucester Journal and Liverpool Echo running dedicated columns on the latest "outrages".

=== January 1913 escalation ===
Despite the outbreak of violence, at the start of January 1913 suffragettes still believed that it was possible to achieve the vote for women by constitutional means. A "Franchise Bill" was proposed to the House of Commons in the winter session of 1912–13, and it was drafted to allow a series of amendments which, if passed, would introduce women's suffrage. However, after an initial debate on 24 January, the speaker of the house ruled the amendments out of order and the government was forced to abandon the bill. In response, the WSPU stepped-up their bombing and arson campaign. The subsequent campaign was directed and in some cases orchestrated by the WSPU leadership, and was specifically designed to terrorise the government and the general public to change their opinions on women's suffrage under threat of violence. In a speech, leader Emmeline Pankhurst declared "guerrilla warfare".

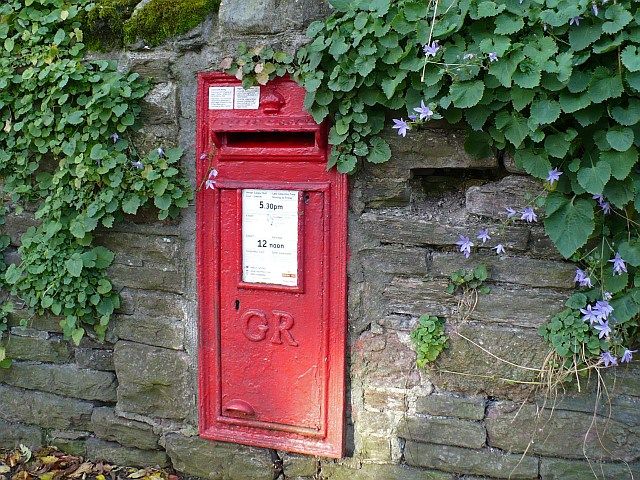
This letter box in Newport, Wales, was one of many that were booby trapped by suffragettes in 1913.

The suffragettes invented the letter bomb, a device intended to kill or injure the recipient, and an increasing number began to be posted. On 29 January, several letter bombs were sent to the Chancellor of the Exchequer, David Lloyd George, and the prime minister Asquith, but they all exploded in post offices, post boxes or mailbags while in transit. In the following weeks, further attacks on letters and mailboxes occurred in cities such as Coventry, London, Edinburgh, Northampton, and York, and in Aberdeen, thick black ink was used to obliterate addresses in postal boxes.

On 6 February five postmen were burned, four severely, in Dundee after handling a phosphorus suffragette letter bomb addressed to Asquith. On 19 February, there was a suffragette bomb attack on Lloyd George's house, Pinfold Manor, with two bombs planted perhaps by Emily Davison. Only one exploded, seriously damaging the building but causing no injuries. The explosion occurred shortly before the arrival of workmen at the house, and the crude nature of the timer – a candle – meant the bomb had been likely to explode while the men were present. WSPU Leader Emmeline Pankhurst was arrested for planning the attack on Lloyd George's house and sentenced to three years in prison. Between February and March, railway signal wires across the country were deliberately cut, further endangering train journeys.

Some of the inspiration for the suffragettes' attacks came from the earlier Fenian dynamite campaign of 1881 to 1885. Although more sophisticated explosive devices were used by suffragettes, inspiration was taken from this campaign's tactic of targeting symbolic locations, such as the Bank of England and St Paul's Cathedral.

In May 1913, the Ashley Road Public School in Aberdeen had its roof destroyed by fire, with arson materials and The Suffragist newspaper found. Amongst the other targets selected by suffragettes were sporting events: there was a failed attempt to burn down the grounds of the All England Lawn Tennis Club at Wimbledon, while a plot to burn down the grandstand of Crystal Palace F.C.'s football ground on the eve of the 1913 FA Cup Final was also foiled. During the year the grandstand of the Manor Ground football stadium in Plumstead was also burned down, costing £1,000 in damages. The destroyed ground was the home of then south London club Arsenal (known as Woolwich Arsenal until 1914), and the same year the financially-troubled club moved from south London to a new stadium in an area of north London, Highbury, where they still remain today. Suffragettes also attempted to burn the grandstands at the stadiums of Preston North End and Blackburn Rovers football clubs during the year. More traditionally masculine sports were specifically targeted in an attempt to protest against male dominance. One sport that was often targeted was golf, and golf courses were often subjected to arson attacks. During some of these attacks prime minister Asquith would be physically assaulted while playing the sport. Additionally, some politicians' private gardens were vandalised with plants pulled out or grass burned with acid and slogan 'Votes for Women' left, including at the home of Aberdeen's Lord Provost, Adam Maitland.

=== Response to Emmeline Pankhurst's imprisonment ===
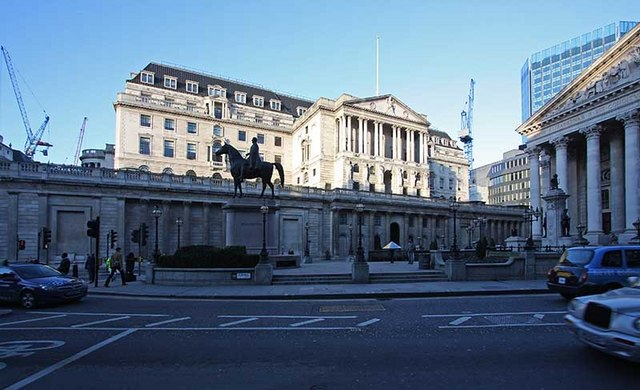
In April 1913 a bomb was planted in the public street outside the Bank of England.

On 4 April, the day after Emmeline Pankhurst was sentenced to three years in prison for her role in the bombing of Lloyd George's house, a suffragette bomb was discovered in the street outside the Bank of England. It was defused in what was one of the busiest public streets in the capital and could have inflicted many casualties. The remains of the device are now on display at the City of London Police Museum in London.

A few days later, grass was cut to display 'Release Mrs. Pankhurst' and the Palm-house greenhouse vandalised with ink in Aberdeen's Duthie Park.

Railways were also the subject of bombing attacks. On 3 April, a bomb exploded next to a passing train in Manchester, nearly killing the driver when flying debris grazed him and narrowly missed his head. Six days later, two bombs were left on the Waterloo to Kingston line, with one being placed on the eastbound train and the other on the westbound train. One was discovered at Battersea when the railway porter spotted smoke in a previously crowded third-class carriage. Later that day, as the Waterloo train pulled into Kingston, the third-class carriage exploded and caught fire. The rest of the carriages were full of passengers who nonetheless escaped without serious injury. The bombs had been packed with lumps of jagged metal, bullets and lead scraps.

The London Underground was also targeted: on 2 May a highly unstable nitroglycerine bomb was discovered on the platform at Piccadilly Circus tube station. Although it had the potential to harm many members of the public on the platform, the bomb was dealt with. On 11 April, the cricket pavilion at the Nevill Ground in Royal Tunbridge Wells was destroyed in a suffragette arson attack. At many of the attacks, copies of The Suffragette newspaper were intentionally left at the scene, or postcards scrawled with messages such as "Votes For Women", to claim responsibility for the attacks.

The high explosive nitroglycerine was used for a number of suffragette bombs, and was likely produced by themselves in their own labs by sympathisers. The explosive is distinctly unstable, and nitroglycerine bombs could be detonated by as little as a sharp blow, making the bombs highly dangerous.

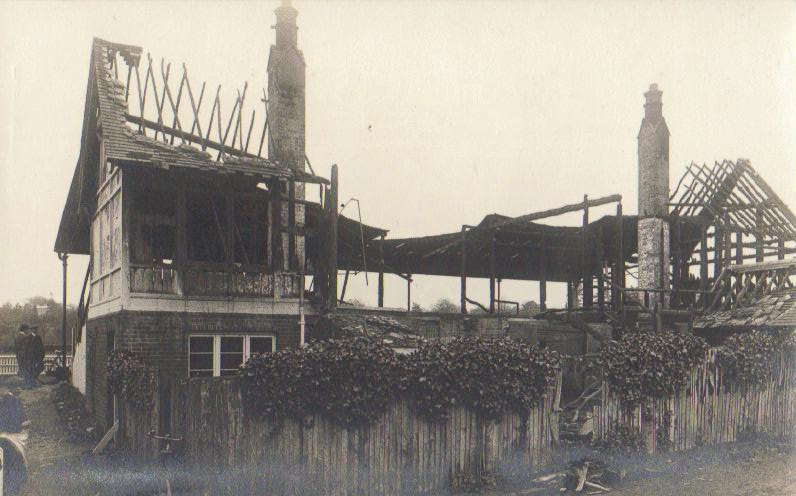
The Nevill Ground Pavilion, Royal Tunbridge Wells, after it was destroyed in an arson attack

During this time, elderly suffragette ladies had reportedly begun to apply for gun licenses, supposedly to "terrify the authorities". On 14 April, the former home of MP Arthur Du Cros was burned down. Du Cros had consistently voted against the enfranchisement of women, which was why he had been chosen as a target. The immediate aftermath of the destruction of Du Cros's house was caught on film, with newsreel company Pathé filming the ruins while they were still smouldering. Some newspapers were also targeted by suffragettes: on 20 April there was an attempt to blow up the offices of the York Herald in York.

One bomb that was found in Smeaton's Tower on Plymouth Hoe during April was found to have "Votes For Women. Death in Ten Minutes" written on it. On 8 May, a potassium nitrate bomb was discovered at St Paul's Cathedral at the start of a sermon. The bomb likely would have destroyed the historic bishop's throne and other parts of the cathedral had it exploded. Meanwhile, suffragette action continued to cause injury to postal workers, with three London postmen being injured after coming into contact with noxious chemicals that had been poured into pillar boxes.

On 14 May, a letter bomb was sent to allegedly anti-women's suffrage magistrate Sir Henry Curtis-Bennett at Bow Street in an attempt to assassinate him, but the bomb was intercepted by London postal workers. Suffragettes again attempted to assassinate Curtis-Bennett by pushing him off a cliff two days later at Margate, although he managed to escape. The railways continued to be the subject of significant attacks throughout May. On 10 May, a bomb was discovered in the waiting room at Liverpool Street Station, London, covered with iron nuts and bolts intended to maximise damage to property and cause serious injury to anyone in proximity. Four days later, another three suffragette bombs were discovered in the third-class carriage of a crowded passenger train arriving from Waterloo at Kingston, made out of nitroglycerine. On 16 May, a second attempted bombing of the London Underground was foiled when a bomb was discovered at Westbourne Park tube station before it could explode. Another attack on the railways occurred on 27 May, when a suffragette bomb was thrown from an express train onto Reading station platform and exploded, but there were no injuries.

During the month of May, 52 bombing and arson attacks had been carried out across the country by suffragettes.

=== Targeting of houses ===
The most common target for suffragette attacks during the campaign was houses or residential properties belonging to politicians or members of the public. These attacks were justified by the WSPU on the grounds that the owners of the properties were invariably male, and so already possessed the vote. Since they already possessed the vote, suffragettes argued, the owners were responsible for the actions of the elected government. Houses were bombed or subjected to arson attacks around the country: in March 1913, fires raged at private homes across Surrey, and homes in Chorley Wood, Norwich, Potters Bar and Hampstead Garden were also set on fire. In Ilford, Essex, three residential streets had their fire alarm wires cut. Other prominent opponents of women's suffrage also saw their homes destroyed by fire and incendiary devices, sometimes in retaliation for police raids on WSPU offices. Relatives of politicians also saw their houses attacked: the Mill House near Liphook, Hampshire was burned because the owner was Reginald McKenna's brother Theodore, while a bomb was set off in a house in Moor Hall Green, Birmingham, as the property was owned by Arthur Chamberlain, brother of Conservative politician Joseph Chamberlain (father to future prime minister Neville Chamberlain). Houses were also attacked in Doncaster. After some suffragettes were thrown out of a political meeting there in June 1913, the house of the man who had thrown them out was burned down. In response to such actions, angry mobs often attacked WSPU meetings, such as in May 1913 when 1,000 people attacked a WSPU meeting in Doncaster. In retaliation, suffragettes burned down more properties in the area.

=== Deaths and further injuries ===
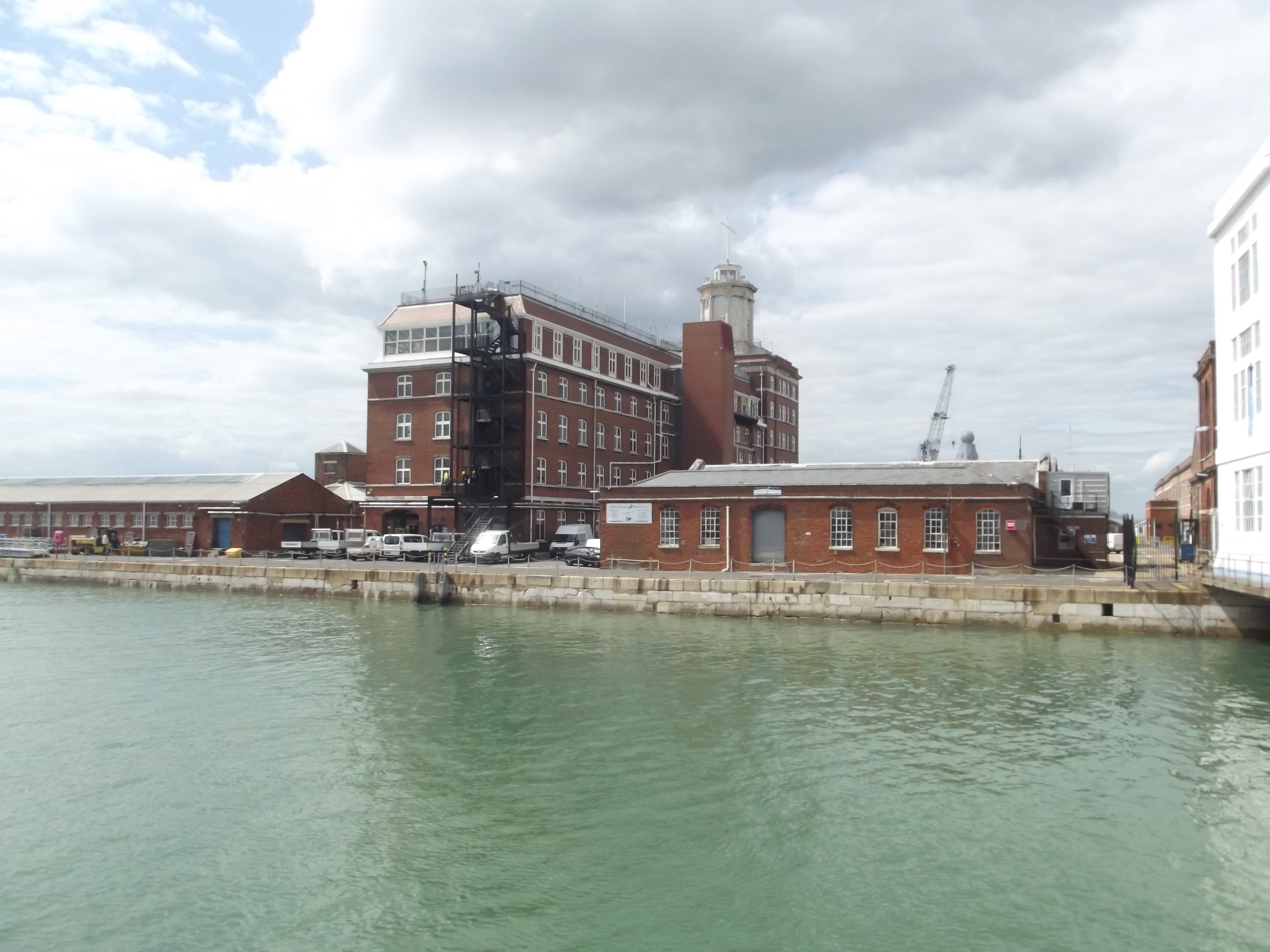
An arson attack on the semaphore tower in Portsmouth dockyard in December 1913 killed 2 men.

In early June 1913, a series of arsons in rural areas in Bradford killed at least two men and several horses. Responsibility was officially claimed by the suffragettes in their official newspaper, The Suffragette. Over the next few months, suffragette attacks continued to threaten death and injury. On 2 June, a suffragette bomb was discovered at the South Eastern District Post Office, London, containing enough nitroglycerine to blow up the entire building and kill the 200 people who worked there. On 18 June, a suffragette bomb narrowly failed to breach the Stratford-upon-Avon Canal in Yardley Wood, Birmingham. Since there was no lock for 11 miles, a breach would have emptied all this section's water into the populated valley below, which likely would have caused a loss of life.

The next day, suffragette Harry Hewitt drew a revolver at the Ascot Gold Cup horseracing event, entering the track during the race and brandishing the gun and a suffragette flag as the competing horses approached. The leading horse collided with the man, causing serious head injuries to him and the jockey. Hewitt was later impounded in a psychiatric hospital. The incident was a copycat event inspired by the events of the Epsom Derby on 4 June 1913, where Emily Davison had famously entered the racecourse and threw herself in front of the King's personal horse, killing her and seriously injuring the jockey.

On 19 July 1913, letter boxes were filled with noxious substances across Birmingham, seriously burning a postman. On the same day, Edith Rigby planted a pipe bomb at the Liverpool Cotton Exchange Building, which exploded in the public hall. After her arrest, she stated her intention was to "show how easy it was to get explosives and put them in public places". On 8 August, a school in Sutton-in-Ashfield was bombed and burned down while Lloyd George was visiting the town, with the bombs later being found to have represented a potentially serious threat to life had anyone been present in the building. On 18 December, suffragettes bombed a wall at Holloway Prison in protest of the imprisonment of an inmate inside. Many houses near the prison were damaged or had their windows blown out by the bombs, showering some children with glass while they slept in their beds. One of the perpetrators was injured by the blast.

In one of the more serious suffragette attacks, a fire was purposely started at Portsmouth dockyard on 20 December 1913, in which 2 men were killed after it spread through the industrial area. In the midst of the firestorm, a battlecruiser, HMS Queen Mary, had to be towed to safety to avoid the flames. Two days before Christmas, several postal workers in Nottingham were severely burned after suffragette letter bombs caused mail bags to ignite.

By the end of the year, The Times newspaper reported that there had been 39 recorded suffragette bombing attacks across the country.

=== 1914 attacks ===
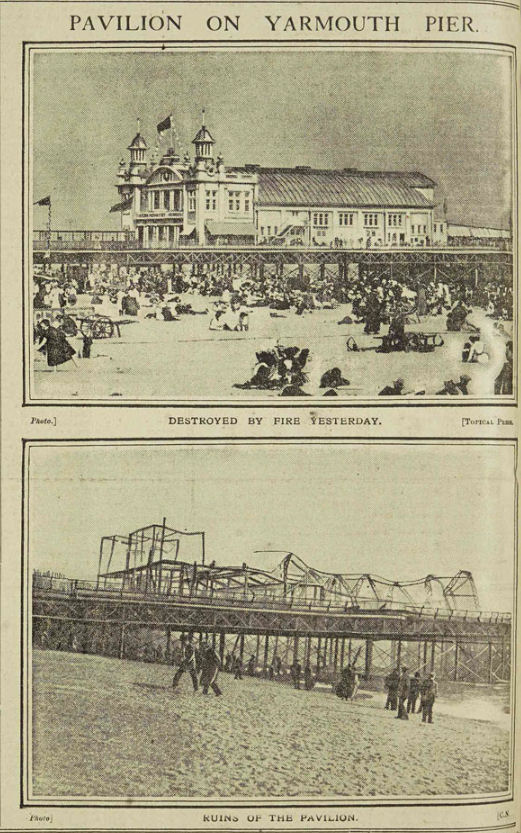
Contemporary literature showing the damage to the Britannia Pier, Great Yarmouth after it was bombed and burned down by suffragettes in 1914

Arson and bombing attacks continued into 1914. One of the first attacks of the year took place on 7 January, when a dynamite bomb was thrown over the wall of the Harewood Army Barracks in Leeds, which was used for police training at the time. The explosion injured one man, throwing others to the ground uninjured. An arson attack on Aberuchill Castle, Comrie, Scotland on 4 February also nearly caused fatalities. The building was set on fire with the servants inside, and they narrowly escaped harm. The next month, the house of another cabinet minister, Home Secretary Reginald McKenna, was attacked by arson.

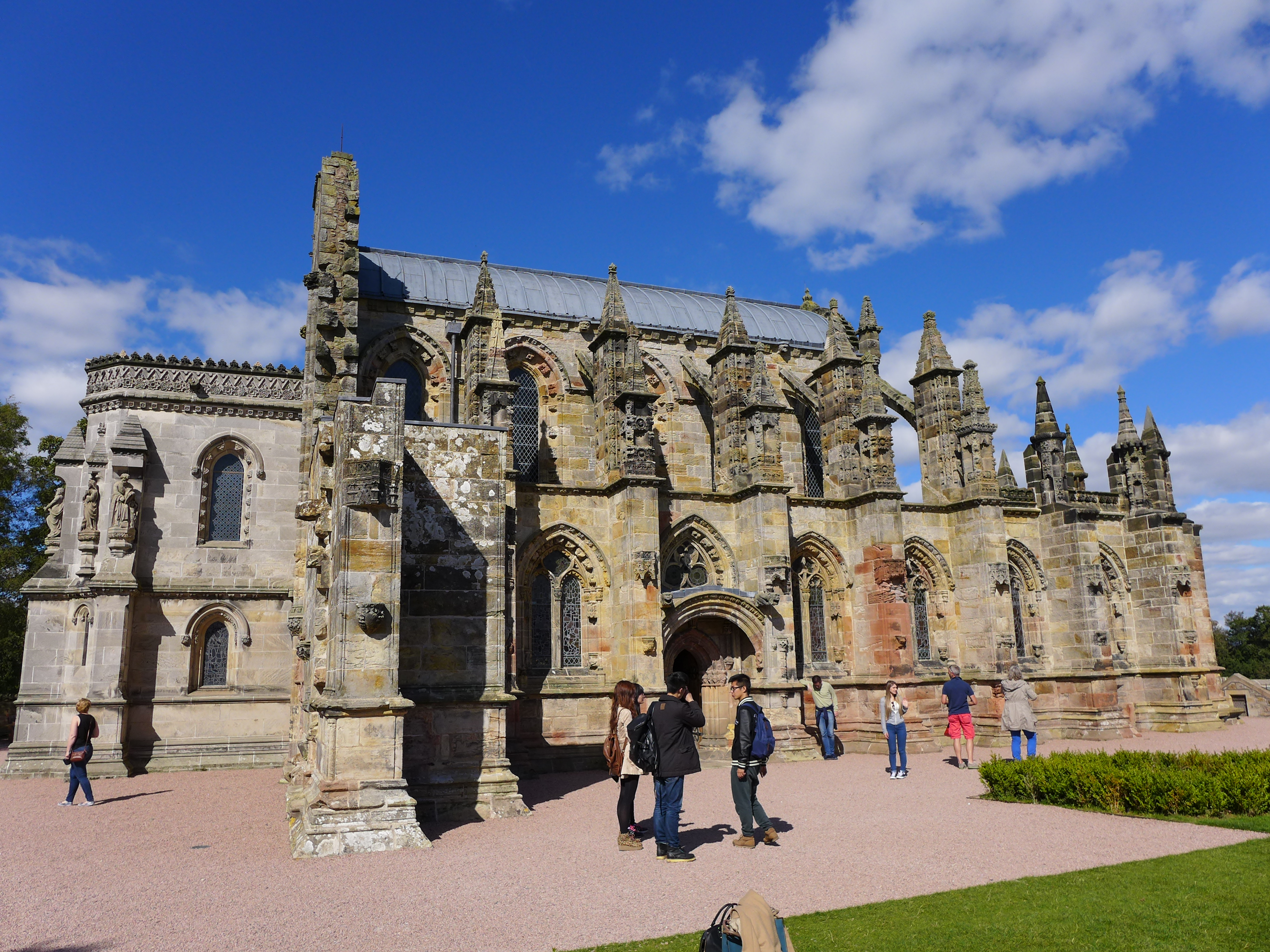
Rosslyn Chapel in Scotland, one of many churches bombed by suffragettes

One common target for suffragette attacks was churches, as it was believed that the Church of England was complicit in reinforcing opposition to women's suffrage. Between 1913 and 1914, 32 churches were the subject of suffragette attacks. Several churches and cathedrals were bombed in 1914: on 5 April, the St Martins-in-the-Field church in Trafalgar Square, London, was bombed, blowing out the windows and showering passers-by with broken glass. A bomb was also discovered in the Metropolitan Tabernacle church in London, and in June, a bomb exploded at Westminster Abbey, damaging the Coronation Chair. Crowded with visitors, around 80–100 people had been in the building when the bomb exploded. The device was probably planted by a member of a group that had left the Abbey moments before the explosion. Some were as close as 20 yards from the bomb at the time and the explosion caused a panic for the exits, but no serious injuries were reported. The bomb had been packed with nuts and bolts to act as shrapnel.

Coincidentally, the House of Commons only 100 yards away was debating how to deal with the violent tactics of the suffragettes. Many in the Commons heard the explosion and rushed to the scene to find out what had happened. Two days after the Westminster Abbey bombing, a second suffragette bomb was discovered in St Paul's Cathedral. Annie Bell also attempted a second bombing of the Church of St John the Evangelist in Smith Square, Westminster on 12 July, placing a bomb underneath a pew during a sermon before leaving. However, the bomb was spotted by a member of the congregation, and Bell, who was already being trailed by special branch detectives, was arrested as she left. The congregation then disarmed the bomb.

A hospital was also targeted in Dundee on 22 May, with suffragettes burning down the building. Two planned assaults on public officials also occurred during the year: in March, the Medical Prisoner Commissioner for Scotland was assaulted by suffragettes in public with horse whips, and on 3 June the medical officer for Holloway Prison, Dr. Forward, was also assaulted on a public street with whips. Another individual was injured in July when a suffragette letter bomb ignited a moving train in Salwick. After the bomb caused a train carriage to catch fire, the train's guard threw the burning materials off the train to avoid further damage. His arms were badly burned, but succeeded in disposing of the material. Another attempt to flood a populated area had also taken place on 7 May, when a bomb was placed next to Penistone Reservoir in Upper Windleden. If successful, the attack would have led to 138 million gallons of water emptying into the populated valleys below, although the anticipated breach did not occur.

== Aborted plots ==
Some attacks were voluntarily aborted before they were carried out. In March 1913, a suffragette plot to kidnap Home Secretary Reginald McKenna was discussed in the House of Commons and in the press. It was reported that suffragettes were contemplating kidnapping one or more cabinet ministers and subjecting them to force-feeding.

According to Special Branch detectives, there were also WSPU plans in 1913 to create a suffragette "army", known as the "People's Training Corps". A detective reported attending a meeting in which 300 young girls and women gathered ready to be trained, supposedly with the eventual aim of proceeding in force to Downing Street to forcibly imprison ministers until they conceded women's suffrage. The group were nicknamed "Mrs Pankhurst's Army".

== Outbreak of war and ending of the campaign ==
In August 1914 the First World War began, which effectively led the end of the suffragette bombing and arson campaign. After Britain joined the war, the WSPU took the decision to suspend their own campaigning. Leader Emmeline Pankhurst instructed suffragettes to stop their violent actions and support the government in the conflict against Germany. From this point forward, suffragettes instead largely channelled their energies into supporting the war effort. By the time of the outbreak of war, the aim of achieving votes for women was still unrealised. Later in the war, the increasing focus of the WSPU and the Pankhurst leadership on supporting the war effort led to the creation of the Women's Party, a political party that continued to promote women's suffrage but that was primarily concerned with patriotic support for the war.

== Reaction to the campaign ==
=== General public ===
The violence employed by suffragettes caused angry reactions amongst some members of the general public, with some actions inciting violent responses in return. A month after the bombing attack on Lloyd George's house in February 1913, a WSPU rally was held in Hyde Park, London, but the meeting quickly degenerated into a riot as members of the public became violent towards the women. Clods of earth were thrown and some of the women manhandled, with many shouting "incendiary" or "shopbreakers" at the WSPU members. This was not an isolated event, as attacks on individuals' houses often saw angry responses, such as in Doncaster in May 1913 when a 1,000 strong mob descended upon a WSPU meeting after several residential properties were burned down in the area. After one attack on Bristol University's sports pavilion on 23 October 1913, undergraduates avenged the attack by raiding the WSPU office in the city.

=== Wider women's suffrage movement ===
The "suffragists" of the largest women's suffrage society, the National Union of Women's Suffrage Societies, led by Millicent Fawcett, were anti-violence, and during the campaign NUWSS propaganda and Fawcett herself increasingly differentiated between the militants of the WSPU and their own non-violent means. The NUWSS also publicly distanced themselves from the violence and direct action of suffragettes. The other major women's suffrage society, the Women's Freedom League, also opposed the violence publicly.

=== Special Branch response ===
The counter-terrorist Special Branch of London's Metropolitan Police, which had been set up during the earlier Fenian dynamite campaign of 1881–1885, bore responsibility for dealing with the campaign. Special Branch officers were employed to cover WSPU meetings and demonstrations in order to pre-empt offences, provide public order intelligence and to record inflammatory speeches. WSPU leaders had been followed by Special Branch officers from 1907 onwards, and Emmeline Pankhurst herself was trailed by officers from the branch. A separate suffragette section of the branch had been formed in 1909.

During the campaign, attempts to attend WSPU meetings became increasingly difficult as officers were recognised and attacked. The attacks became so widespread that police had to invent new and never before attempted methods of counter-terrorism. These included the use of double agents, covert photo surveillance, public pleas for funding and the use of a secret bomb disposal unit on Duck Island in St James's Park, London. The branch was also given extra staff in order to protect ministers and their families, who were increasingly being targeted. Prime Minister Asquith wrote that "even our children had to be vigilantly protected against the menace of abduction". Many arrests were also made at WSPU meetings, and raids were often conducted against WSPU offices, in an attempt to find the bomb-makers' arsenal. In one raid on the home of Jennie Baines, a half-made bomb, a fully made bomb and guns were found. Raids were also conducted against the offices of The Suffragette newspaper, and the printers were threatened with prosecution. Because of this, there were periods that the newspaper could not publish, but secret reserves were kept for the newspaper to publish as many issues as possible.

At the time, planting bombs was officially a hangable offence, and so suffragettes took special measures to avoid being caught by police when carrying out bombing attacks.

== Impact and effectiveness ==
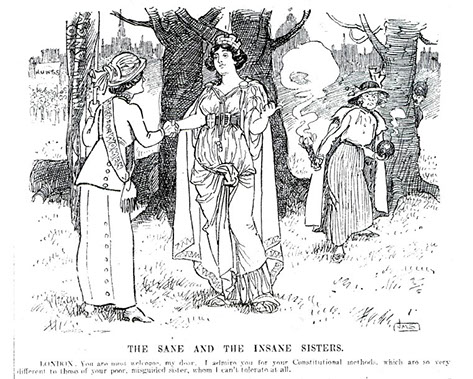
A 1913 cartoon, showing "Dame London" welcoming a suffragist, while behind her a suffragette holding a bomb threatens London

At the conclusion of the campaign in August 1914, the attacks had, in total, cost approximately £700,000 in damages (equivalent to £69,830,000 in 2025), although according to historian C. J. Bearman this figure does not include "the damage done to works of art or the more minor forms of militancy such as window-smashing and letter-burning". Bearman also notes that this figure does not include the extra costs inflicted by violent suffragette action, "such as extra police time, additional caretakers and night watchmen hired to protect property, and revenue lost when tourist attractions such as Haddon Hall and the State Apartments at Windsor Castle were closed for fear of suffragette attacks". With these additional considerations, Bearman asserts, the campaign cost the British economy between £1 and £2 million in 1913 to 1914 alone (approximately £130–£240 million today). There was an average of 21 bombing and arson incidents per month in 1913, and 15 per month in 1914, with there being an arson or bombing attack in every month between February 1913 and August 1914. Bearman calculates that there was a total of at least 337 arson and bombing attacks between 1913 and 1914, but states that the true number could be well over 500. By the end of the campaign, more than 1,300 people had been arrested and imprisoned for suffragette violence across the United Kingdom.

The extent to which suffragette violence contributed to the eventual enfranchisement of women in 1918 has been debated by historians, although the consensus of historical opinion is that the terror campaign was not effective. With the aim of gaining votes for women still unrealized by the outbreak of war in 1914, the WSPU had failed to create the kind of "national crisis" which might have forced the government into concessions. Historian Brian Harrison has also stated that opponents to women's suffrage believed the militant campaign had benefited them, since it had largely alienated public opinion and placed the suffrage question beyond parliamentary consideration. In May 1913 another attempt had been made to pass a bill in parliament which would introduce women's suffrage, but the bill actually did worse than previous attempts when it was voted on, something which much of the press blamed on the increasingly violent tactics of the suffragettes. The impact of the WSPU's violent attacks drove many members of the general public away from supporting the cause, and some members of the WSPU itself were also alienated by the escalation of violence, which led to splits in the organisation and the formation of groups such as the East London Federation of Suffragettes in 1914. Bearman has asserted that contemporary opinion overwhelmingly was of the view that WSPU violence had shelved the question of women's suffrage until the organization "came to its senses or had disappeared from the scene". At the time it was largely only suffragettes themselves that argued their campaign had been effective.

In the 1930s, soon after all women over the age of 21 had received the vote under the Representation of the People Act of 1928, some historians asserted that militancy had evidently succeeded. The Suffragette Fellowship, which compiled the sources on the movement that were often used by later historians, also decided in this decade that they were not going to mention any of the bombings in any of the sources. This was partly in order to protect former suffragettes from prosecution, but was also an attempt to step away from the violent rhetoric and to change the cultural memory of the suffragette movement. Many official sources on suffragette violence are only now beginning to be released from archives.

Some feminist historians and supporters of feminist icon Emmeline Pankhurst such as Sandra Stanley Horton and June Purvis have also renewed the arguments that the terror campaign had succeeded, with Purvis arguing that assertions about the counter-productiveness of violence deny or diminish the achievements of Pankhurst. However, Purvis's arguments have been challenged by Bearman. Revisionist historians such as Harrison and Martin Pugh have also attempted to draw greater attention to the role of the non-militants, such as those in the anti-violence National Union of Women's Suffrage Societies (NUWSS) (known as "suffragists"), and emphasised their understated role in gaining votes for women.

== Classification as terrorism ==
During the campaign, the WSPU described its own bombing and arson attacks as terrorism, with suffragettes declaring themselves to be "terrorists" in 1913. Christabel Pankhurst also increasingly used the word "terrorism" to describe the WSPU's actions during the campaign, and stated that the WSPU's greater "rebellion" was a form of terrorism. Emmeline Pankhurst stated that the suffragettes committed violent acts because they wanted to "terrorise the British public". The WSPU also reported each of its attacks in its newspaper The Suffragette under the headline "Reign of Terror". The authorities talked of arson and bomb attacks as terrorism, and contemporary newspapers in the UK and in the United States also made use of the term "Suffragette Terrorism" to report on WSPU attacks. One instance of this was after the bombing attack on David Lloyd George's house in February 1913, when the Pall Mall Gazette reported the attack under the specific headline of "Suffragette Terrorism".

The bombing and arson campaign has seen classification as a single-issue terrorism campaign by academics, and is classified as such in The Oxford Handbook of Terrorism. Many historians have also asserted that the campaign contained terrorist acts. Rachel Monaghan published three articles in 1997, 2000 and 2007 in terrorism-themed academic journals in which she argued that the campaign can be described as one that was terrorist in nature. In 2005, historian C. J. Bearman published a study on the bombing and arson campaign in which he asserted: "The intention of the campaign was certainly terrorist in terms of the word's definition, which according to the Concise Oxford Dictionary (1990 edition) is 'a person who uses or favours violent and intimidating methods of coercing a government or community'. The intention of coercing the community is clearly expressed in the WSPU's Seventh Annual Report, and, according to Annie Kenney, that of coercing Parliament was endorsed by Emmeline and Christabel Pankhurst themselves. The question is therefore not whether the campaign was terrorist, or whether the WSPU (in 1912–14) can be called a terrorist organization, but whether its terrorism worked." Bearman later published a further article in 2007 which also claims that the suffragette campaign was a terrorist one.

Fern Riddell has also highlighted that, as well as being actions that would be defined as terrorism today, suffragette bombing and arson attacks were considered terrorist attacks at the time. Other feminist historians such as Cheryl Jorgensen-Earl have also agreed that the campaign was a terrorist one on the grounds that the WSPU were fighting a just war. Other historians who have asserted that the campaign involved terrorism include Paula Bartley, Laura Mayhall and George Legg.

Feminist historian June Purvis has consistently objected to the characterisation of suffragette actions as terrorism, in part arguing that the WSPU leadership was not responsible for the actions of some of its members. Arguing that the leadership of the WSPU emphasised that their followers were instructed not to endanger human life, she has asserted that suffragettes cannot be compared to modern-day terrorists. She further claimed that the suffragettes did not kill or harm anyone. However, Purvis's arguments remain controversial. Fern Riddell has criticised claims that the suffragettes did not cause harm or intend to cause harm, stating: "The newspapers (and even the accounts of the militant suffragettes) prove that there were numerous instances where injuries occurred, and that personal risk, or even death, was great". Rachel Monaghan has argued that the use of letter bombs by suffragettes can be seen to call into question whether the WSPU truly aimed to avoid endangering human life, while C. J. Bearman has criticised Purvis directly, claiming that it is inaccurate to state that the WSPU was not responsible for the actions of its paid members, and has called this assertion "grotesque". Purvis maintains that those who support the assertion that the suffragettes committed acts of terror "seek to condemn these radical women who were campaigning for their democratic right to the parliamentary vote".

== Influence on later campaigns ==
The campaign in part provided the inspiration for later bombing and terrorist campaigns in Britain, such as those conducted by the Irish Republican Army (IRA). The S-Plan of 1939 to 1940 utilised the tactic of undertaking incendiary attacks on pillar boxes, and also saw the planting of explosive devices. The tactic of packing nuts and bolts into bombs to act as shrapnel, often regarded as a later twentieth-century IRA invention, was also first employed by the suffragettes. Several suffragette bombings, such as the attempted bombing of Liverpool Street station in 1913, saw the use of this method. The combination of high explosive bombs, incendiary devices and letter bombs used by suffragettes also provided the pattern for the IRA campaigns of the 1970s and 1980s. Unknown to many, the first terrorist bomb to explode in Northern Ireland in the twentieth century was not detonated by the IRA but by the suffragettes at Lisburn Cathedral in August 1914. Suffragette tactics also provided a template for more contemporary attacks in Britain.

== Timeline of the campaign ==
Below is a timeline of some of the major recorded events in the campaign:

=== 1912 ===
- 13 July 1912: Secretary of State for the Colonies Lewis Harcourt has his home burned down by suffragettes. The 8 occupants survive uninjured.
- 19 July 1912: Mary Leigh hurls a hatchet towards H. H. Asquith in Dublin but misses, with the hatchet instead cutting Irish MP John Redmond on the ear.
- 19 July 1912: The Theatre Royal, Dublin, is set fire to and bombed while the audience, which includes Prime Minister Asquith, leaves after a performance.
- 19 July 1912: A powerful bomb is planted in Home Secretary Reginald McKenna's office but is discovered.
- 25 October 1912: Hugh Franklin sets fire to his train carriage as it pulls into Harrow station. He is subsequently arrested and charged with endangering the safety of passengers.
- 28 November to 3 December 1912: Post boxes around Britain are booby trapped; many letters burst into flames at post offices and paraffin and lit matches are also put in pillar boxes.
- 30 November 1912: A man is beaten by Emily Davison with a whip at Aberdeen railway station, as she believed the man was politician David Lloyd George in disguise.
- 17 December 1912: Railway signals in the Potters Bar area are tied together and disabled by suffragettes with the intention of endangering train journeys.

=== 1913 ===
- 29 January 1913: A number of letter bombs are sent to David Lloyd George and H. H. Asquith, but they all explode or are discovered while in transit.
- 1 February 1913: Leonora Cohen smashed the glass display of the Order of Merit in the Wakefield Tower of the Tower of London.
- 6 February 1913: 5 Dundee postmen are burned when handling a suffragette letter bomb addressed to Asquith.
- 19 February 1913: Suffragettes bomb Lloyd George's house, with two bombs being planted by Emily Davison. Only one bomb functions but significant damage is done to the building, although there are no injuries.
- 22 February 1913: A postman is burned at Lewisham post office, south London, when handling a suffragette letter bomb.
- 27 February 1913: A suffragette is arrested while trying to burn down the grounds of the All England Lawn Tennis Club at Wimbledon.
- February–March 1913: Railway signal wires cut across Britain, endangering train journeys.
- 3 April 1913: A bomb explodes next to a train line in Manchester while a passenger train is passing, which nearly kills the driver when his head is grazed by flying debris.
- 4 April 1913: A bomb is discovered emitting smoke in the busy street outside the Bank of England and defused.
- 8 April 1913: Two bombs are left on the Waterloo to Kingston train line. One bomb is discovered early, but the other explodes as the train from Waterloo arrives as Kingston, causing a fire. The rest of the carriages are full of passengers, but they manage to escape.
- 11 April 1913: Council schools in Gateshead are set on fire by suffragettes, but there are no injuries.
- 14 April 1913: The home of MP Arthur Du Cros in St Leonards-on-Sea is burned down.
- 18 April 1913: A plot to blow up the grandstand at Crystal Palace football ground on the eve of the 1913 FA Cup Final is foiled.
- May 1913: Three London postmen are injured by noxious chemicals placed in post boxes.
- 2 May 1913: A nitroglycerine bomb is discovered on the platform of Piccadilly Circus tube station.
- 8 May 1913: A bomb is discovered at St Paul's Cathedral, London.
- 10 May 1913: A bomb is discovered in the waiting room at Liverpool Street Station, London, made out of iron nuts and bolts intended to maximise damage to property and cause serious injury to anyone in proximity.
- 14 May 1913: Three nitroglycerine bombs are discovered in a carriage of a crowded passenger train arriving from Waterloo at Kingston.
- 14 May 1913: A letter bomb is sent to anti-women's suffrage magistrate Sir Henry Curtis-Bennett at Bow Street in an attempt to assassinate him, but the bomb is intercepted by London postal workers.
- 16 May 1913: A bomb is discovered at Westbourne Park tube station before it can explode.
- 27 May 1913: A bomb is thrown from an express train onto Reading station platform and explodes, but there are no injuries.
- Early June 1913: A series of fires started in Bradford kill at least 2 men as well as several horses. The acts are claimed by the suffragettes.
- 2 June 1913: Bomb discovered at the South Eastern District Post Office, London, containing enough nitroglycerine to blow up the entire building and kill the 200 people who worked there.
- 18 June 1913: A bomb explodes on the Stratford-upon-Avon Canal in Yardley Wood, Birmingham, causing serious damage to the canal but failing to burst its banks. Since there was no lock for 11 miles, a breech would have emptied all of this section's water into the populated valley below.
- 19 June 1913: A suffragette enters the racetrack during the race at the Ascot Gold Cup horse racing event brandishing a revolver and a suffragette flag. The leading horse collides with him, with the jockey of the horse being badly injured and Hewitt suffering serious head wounds.
- 19 July 1913: A postman is seriously burned after letter boxes are filled with noxious substances across Birmingham.
- 8 August 1913: A school is bombed and burned down in Sutton-in-Ashfield while David Lloyd George is visiting the town.
- 18 December 1913: A wall at Holloway Prison is bombed. Many houses near the prison were damaged, showering some children with glass while they slept. One of the perpetrators of the attack was injured.
- 20 December 1913: A large fire is started at Portsmouth dockyard, killing two sailors after it spreads uncontrollably through the industrial area.
- 23 December 1913: Several postal workers are burned after letter bombs cause mail bags to ignite in Nottingham.

=== 1914 ===
- 7 January 1914: A dynamite bomb is thrown over the wall of the Harewood Barracks in Leeds, which is being used to train police officers. The explosion injures one man.
- 4 February 1914: Aberuchill Castle in Scotland is burned down by the suffragettes. The servants inside narrowly escape without being killed.
- 5 April 1914: A bomb explodes in St Martin-in-the-Fields church in Trafalgar Square, London, blowing out the windows and showering passers-by with broken glass. The explosion also starts a fire.
- 14 April 1914: Anti-suffrage Chancellor of the Duchy of Lancaster Charles Hobhouse has his home burned down by suffragettes.
- 17 April 1914: The Britannia Pier, Great Yarmouth is destroyed after being bombed and burned down.
- 28 April 1914: The Bath Hotel in Felixstowe is burnt down with no injuries.
- 7 May 1914: An attempt to flood a populated area fails after a bomb is placed next to Penistone Reservoir in Upper Windleden. If successful, the attack would have led to 138 million gallons of water emptying into the populated valleys below.
- 11 May 1914: A bomb is discovered at the Metropolitan Tabernacle church and defused.
- 11 June 1914: A bomb explodes at Westminster Abbey; damaging the Coronation Chair.
- 13 June 1914: A second bomb is discovered before it can explode in St Paul's Cathedral.
- 11 July 1914: A guard is severely burned when a letter bomb ignites a carriage on a moving train in Salwick. The guard is badly burned on his arms as he throws the burning letter bomb off the train to avoid further damage.

== See also ==
- List of suffragette bombings
- 1913 Epsom Derby
- 2016–17 all-female UK terror plot
- Representation of the People Act 1918

== Bibliography ==
- Atkinson, Diane (2018). Rise Up, Women!: The Remarkable Lives of the Suffragettes. Bloomsbury Publishing. ISBN 978-1-4088-4407-6.
- Bartley, Paula (2003). "Emmeline Pankhurst: Paula Bartley Reappraises the Role of the Leader of the Suffragettes. (Profiles in Power)". History Review: 41–46. ISSN 0962-9610. Archived from the original on 16 April 2016.
- Bearman, C. J. (2005). "An Examination of Suffragette Violence". The English Historical Review. 120 (486): 365–397. doi:10.1093/ehr/cei119. ISSN 0013-8266. JSTOR 3490924.
- Cholmeley, Robert Francis (1907). "Tactics" . The Case for Women's Suffrage: 154–163. Wikidata Q107276376 – via Wikisource.
- Ditrych, O. (2014). Tracing the Discourses of Terrorism: Identity, Genealogy and State. Springer. ISBN 978-1-137-39496-5.
- Jones, Ian (2016). London: Bombed Blitzed and Blown Up: The British Capital Under Attack Since 1867. Frontline Books. ISBN 978-1-4738-7901-0.
- Kay, Joyce (2008). "It Wasn't Just Emily Davison! Sport, Suffrage and Society in Edwardian Britain". The International Journal of the History of Sport. 25 (10): 1338–1354. doi:10.1080/09523360802212271. hdl:1893/765. ISSN 0952-3367. S2CID 154063364.
- Mayhall, Laura (2003). The Militant Suffrage Movement: Citizenship and Resistance in Britain, 1860–1930. Oxford: Oxford University Press. ISBN 978-0195159936.
- Monaghan, Rachel (1997). "'Votes for women': An analysis of the militant campaign". Terrorism and Political Violence. 9 (2): 65–78. doi:10.1080/09546559708427403. ISSN 0954-6553.
- Monaghan, Rachel (2000). "Single-Issue Terrorism: A Neglected Phenomenon?". Studies in Conflict & Terrorism. 23 (4): 255–265. doi:10.1080/10576100050174977. ISSN 1057-610X. S2CID 72122553.
- Purvis, June (2019). "Did militancy help or hinder the granting of women's suffrage in Britain?". Women's History Review. 28 (7): 1200–1234. doi:10.1080/09612025.2019.1654638. ISSN 0961-2025. S2CID 204365462.
- Riddell, Fern (2018). Death in Ten Minutes: The forgotten life of radical suffragette Kitty Marion. Hodder & Stoughton. ISBN 978-1-4736-6621-4.
- Walker, Rebecca (2020). "Deeds, Not Words: The Suffragettes and Early Terrorism in the City of London". The London Journal. 45 (1): 53–64. doi:10.1080/03058034.2019.1687222. ISSN 0305-8034. S2CID 212994082.
- Webb, Simon (2014). The Suffragette Bombers: Britain's Forgotten Terrorists. Pen and Sword. ISBN 978-1-78340-064-5.
- Wilson, Ray (2015). Special Branch: A History: 1883–2006. Biteback Publishing. ISBN 978-1-84954-963-9.
