= Henry Grattan Jnr =

Irish politician

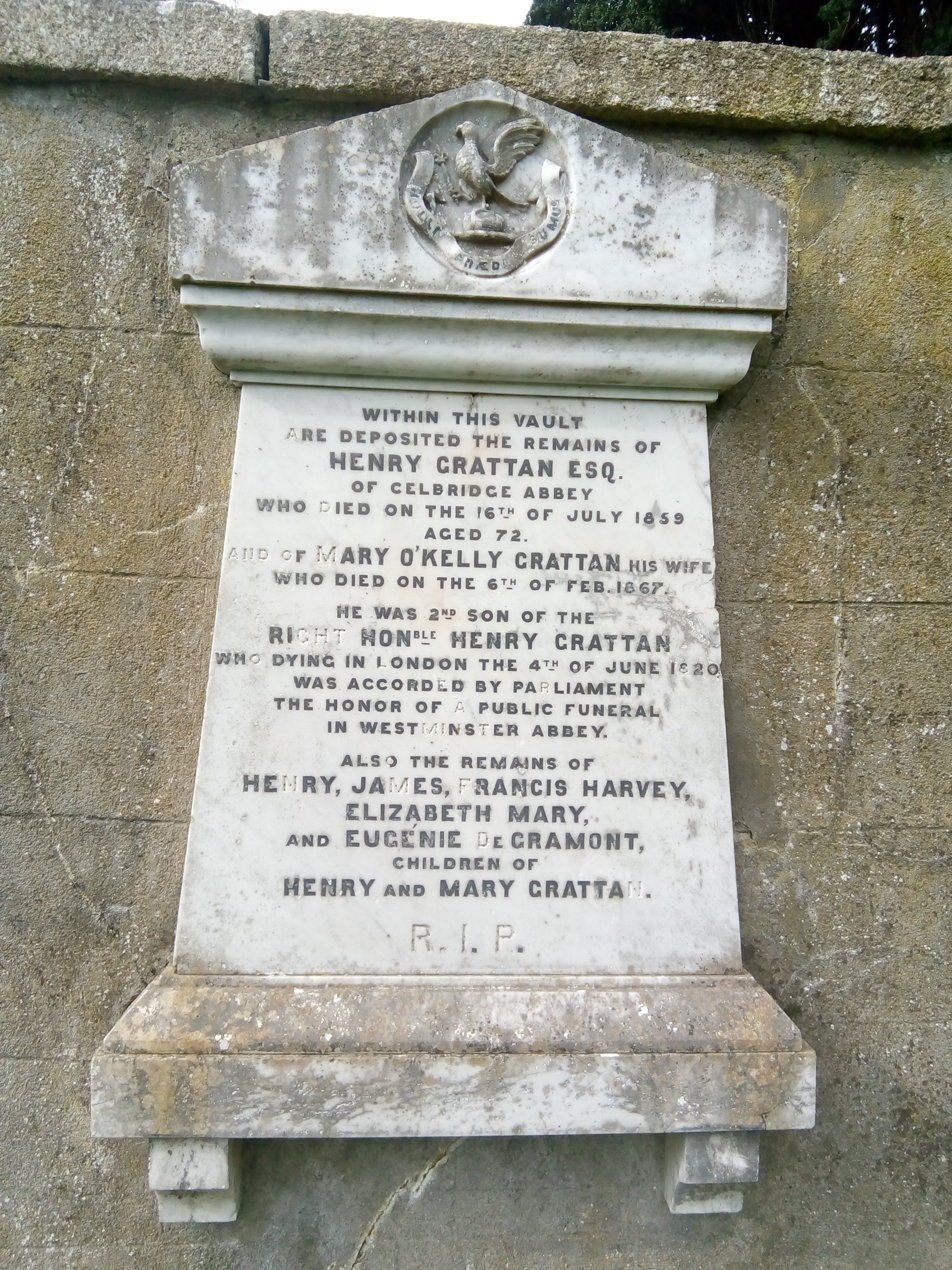
Grattan's tomb in Tea Lane Graveyard

Henry Grattan (1789 – 16 July 1859) was an Irish politician, who was Member of Parliament for Dublin City on behalf of the Whigs from 1826 to 1830 in the British House of Commons. From 1831 to 1852, he represented County Meath for the Repeal Association.

Grattan entered Trinity College Dublin in 1804, graduating B.A. in 1808 and M.A. in 1811, and was called to the Irish Bar in 1810. His father, also named Henry Grattan, was a famous Irish orator and statesman. Grattan senior was MP for Dublin City, and on his father's death in 1820, Grattan junior was the Whig candidate to succeed him. However at a by-election on 30 June of that year, he was defeated by the Tory candidate, Thomas Ellis. In the 1826 general election, Grattan was returned unopposed for the Dublin City seat. He was defeated in the 1830 general election, when he finished third in the election for the two-member Dublin City seat.

In 1831, Grattan was elected an MP for County Meath at a by-election on 11 August 1831 after having been defeated there in the general election earlier that year. He retained his seat as a Repealer candidate in the 1832 general election and as a Liberal Repealer in 1835 and 1841. In the general election of 1847 Grattan was again elected as a Repealer candidate. However, in the 1852 general election, Grattan, standing as a Liberal, pledged to support the Irish Independent Opposition Party (which some of the Irish MPs organised in 1852), was defeated.

Parliament of the United Kingdom
Preceded by Sir Robert Shaw, Bt and Thomas Ellis	Member of Parliament for Dublin City; 1826–1830; With: George Moore	Succeeded by Sir Frederick Shaw, Bt and George Moore
Preceded by Arthur Plunkett, Baron Killeen and Sir Marcus Somerville, Bt	Member of Parliament for County Meath; 1831–1852; With: Arthur Plunkett, Baron Killeen to 1832; Morgan O'Connell 1832–1840; Matthew Corbally 1840–1841; Daniel O'Connell 1841–1842; Matthew Corbally from 1842	Succeeded by Matthew Corbally and Frederick Lucas
