= Robert Henry Metge =

Irish politician (1850–1900)

Robert Henry Metge MP JP

Member of Parliament for County Meath
- In office 31 March 1880 – 21 February 1884 Serving with Edward Sheil (April 1882 – 1884); Michael Davitt (February 1882 – April 1882); Alexander Martin Sullivan (May 1880 – February 1882); Charles Stewart Parnell (1880 – May 1880)
- Preceded by: Charles Stewart Parnell; Nicholas Ennis
- Succeeded by: Constituency abolished

Personal details
- Born: 1850 Athlumney, Co Meath, Ireland
- Died: 19 September 1900 (aged 49–50) Kingstown (Dún Laoghaire), Co Dublin, Ireland
- Party: Home Rule
- Spouse(s): Lilian Margaret Grubb (m. 1892) Frances Thomasina Virginia Lambart (m. 1874)
- Children: 15
- Education: Trinity College Dublin

Robert Henry Metge JP (1850 – 19 September 1900) was an Irish Home Rule League politician. He was born in Athlumney, Co Meath, the son of John Charles Metge and Eliza Ibbetson Cole of Navan, Co Meath.

A barrister, he was elected as a Member of Parliament (MP) for County Meath in 1880, but resigned the seat on 30 July 1883.

His first marriage was in 1874 to Frances Thomasine Virginia Lambart, with whom he had thirteen children; his second wife Lillian Margaret Metge was a leading suffragette, with whom he had two daughters. After his premature death, she was arrested for causing an explosion, damaging the Cathedral in Lisburn.

Robert Metge died in Kingstown, Co Dublin on 19 September 1900.

Parliament of the United Kingdom
Preceded by Charles Stewart Parnell; Nicholas Ennis	Member of Parliament for County Meath; 1880 – 1883; With: Edward Sheil (April 1882 – 1884); Michael Davitt (February 1882 – April 1882); Alexander Martin Sullivan (May 1880 – February 1882); Charles Stewart Parnell (1880 – May 1880)	Constituency abolished
