= 1875 County Meath by-election =

UK Parliamentary by-election

The 1875 County Meath by-election was fought on 17 April 1875. The by-election was fought due to the death of the incumbent Home Rule MP, John Martin. It was won by the Home Rule candidate Charles Stewart Parnell.
