= Matthew Corbally =

Politician, died 1870

Matthew Corbally MP

Member of Parliament for County Meath
- In office 10 June 1842 – 25 November 1870 Serving with Edward McEvoy (1855–1871); Frederick Lucas (1852–1855); Henry Grattan (1842–1852)
- Preceded by: Daniel O'Connell; Henry Grattan
- Succeeded by: Edward McEvoy; John Martin
- In office 4 February 1840 – 9 July 1841 Serving with Henry Grattan
- Preceded by: Morgan O'Connell; Henry Grattan
- Succeeded by: Daniel O'Connell; Henry Grattan

Personal details
- Born: April 1797
- Died: 25 November 1870 (aged 73)
- Resting place: Saint Colmcille's Church, Skryne, County Meath
- Party: Liberal
- Other political affiliations: Independent Irish (1852–1859); Whig (before 1852)
- Spouse: Matilda Margaret Preston (m. 1842)
- Children: Mary Margaret Stourton, Baroness Stourton

Matthew Elias Corbally (April 1797 – 25 November 1870) was an Irish Liberal, Whig and Independent Irish Party politician.

== Family ==
Corbally was the son of Elias Corbally and Mary née Keogh. He married Matilda Margaret Preston, daughter of Jenico Preston, 12th Viscount Gormanston (1775–1860) and Margaret Southwell, in 1842. They had one child, Mary Margaret Corbally (1845–1925), who married Alfred Stourton, Baron Mowbray, Segrave and Stourton and had ten children. They lived at Corbalton Hall in County Meath. Corbally and his wife are buried in a sealed vault at Saint Colmcille's Church, Skryne.

== Education ==
He was educated by Rev. Richard Norris in Drogheda, and then at Trinity College Dublin.

== Political career ==
Corbally was first elected unopposed as a Whig-Radical MP for County Meath at a by-election in 1840 but he did not stand for re-election at the next general election in 1841. When Daniel O'Connell was elected for both Meath and County Cork a by-election was called at which Corbally was again elected as a Whig unopposed. He then held the seat for the remainder of his life in 1870, joining the Independent Irish Party shortly after the general election in 1852 and joining the Liberal Party when it was formed in 1859. He was a supporter of the abolition of tithes, reform of corporations, and reform of the ballot, and was opposed to privileges being given to the Bank of Ireland.

== Other activities ==
Corbally was also a Justice of the Peace and, in 1838, he was High Sheriff of Meath. He was also a captain in the Royal Meath Regiment.

Parliament of the United Kingdom
Preceded by Daniel O'Connell; Henry Grattan	Member of Parliament for County Meath; 1842 – 1870; With: Edward McEvoy (1855–1871); Frederick Lucas (1852–1855); Henry Grattan (1842–1852)	Succeeded by Edward McEvoy; John Martin
Preceded by Morgan O'Connell; Henry Grattan	Member of Parliament for County Meath; 1840 – 1841; With: Henry Grattan	Succeeded by Daniel O'Connell; Henry Grattan
