= Christ Church Cathedral, Lisburn =

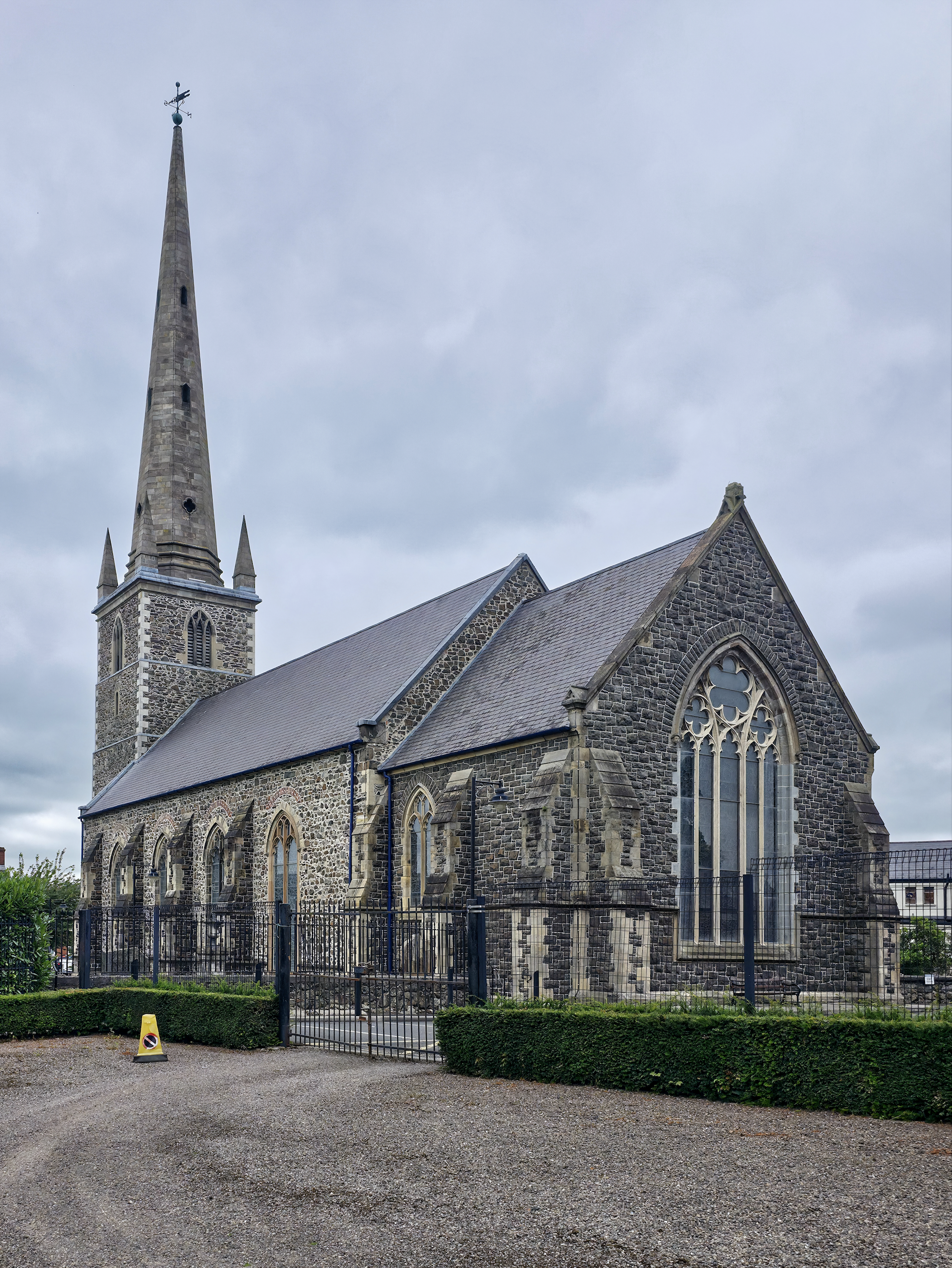
- Christ Church Cathedral, Lisburn
- 54°30′40″N 06°02′30″W
- Location: Castle and Bridge Street, Lisburn
- Country: Northern Ireland
- Denomination: Church of Ireland
- Churchmanship: Low Church Evangelical
- Website: https://lisburncathedral.org/

Architecture
- Groundbreaking: 1708

Administration
- Province: Province of Armagh
- Diocese: Diocese of Connor

Clergy
- Bishop: Bishop of Connor
- Dean: The Very Revd Sam Wright

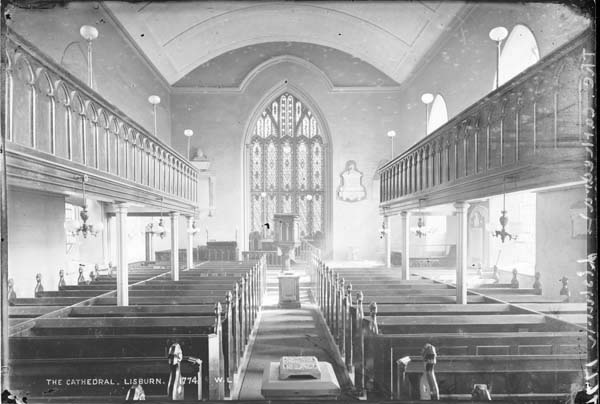
Lisburn Cathedral, interior

Christ Church Cathedral, Lisburn (also known as Lisburn Cathedral), is the cathedral church of the Diocese of Connor in the Church of Ireland. It is situated in Lisburn, Northern Ireland, in the ecclesiastical province of Armagh. Previously St Thomas's church, it is now one of two cathedrals in the Diocese, the other being the shared Cathedral Church of St Anne, Belfast. The Dean and Chapter of Lisburn Cathedral are known as the Dean and Chapter of St Saviour, Connor in honour of the original cathedral of Connor, County Antrim.

The current building was started in 1708, after its predecessor was burnt down. Its noteworthy features are the gallery seating in the nave and the octagonal spire.

At approximately 55m (181 feet) (Note: (Spire and weather vane exactly 106 feet in building plans and tower approximately 75 feet)) it is the tallest and most prominent building in the city of Lisburn.

== History ==
A church was built on the cathedral site in the early 1600s by Sir Fulke Conway as a chapel of ease for his new castle at what was then called Lisnagarvey. It was consecrated in 1623 and dedicated to St Thomas, but was destroyed along with much of the town during the rebellion of 1641.

The church was quickly rebuilt and in 1662 St Thomas's was designated the cathedral church and episcopal seat of the United Diocese of Down and Connor by Charles II and renamed Christ Church Cathedral. Additional gallery seating was introduced in 1674 with access via a bell tower.

The cathedral burned down a second time in 1707. Again it was quickly rebuilt starting in 1708 und was completed 11 years later in 1719, retaining the galleries in the nave with access via the tower which had survived the fire. The octagonal spire was added in 1804 and the chancel built and consecrated in 1889. In the year of 2003, the front gates from 1796 were replaced and in 2004 the clock chimes refurbished.

=== Suffragette bombing ===
On 31 July 1914 protesting Suffragettes bombed the cathedral. A small explosion blew out one of the oldest stained glass windows. Four women arrested after the attack, at the home of Lillian Metge (a middle-class widow who lived in Seymour Street), had to receive police protection when arrested. All the windows of Mrs Metge's house were broken by residents opposed to their actions and the government threatened to raise the rates to pay for the damage caused. No charges were pressed due to the outbreak of World War I and they were released by order of the Home Secretary.

== See also ==
- Dean of Connor List of the Deans of Connor
