= Women's suffrage in the United Kingdom =

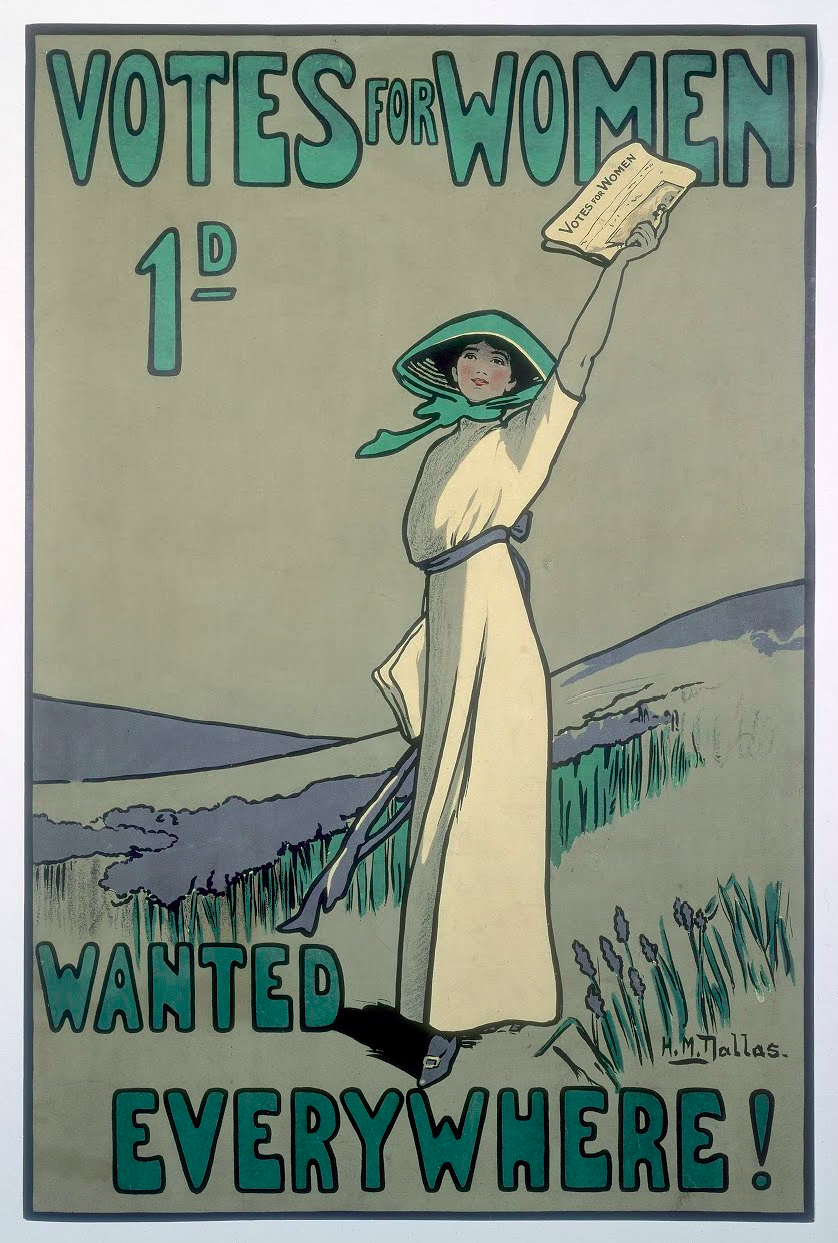
WSPU poster by Hilda Dallas, 1909.

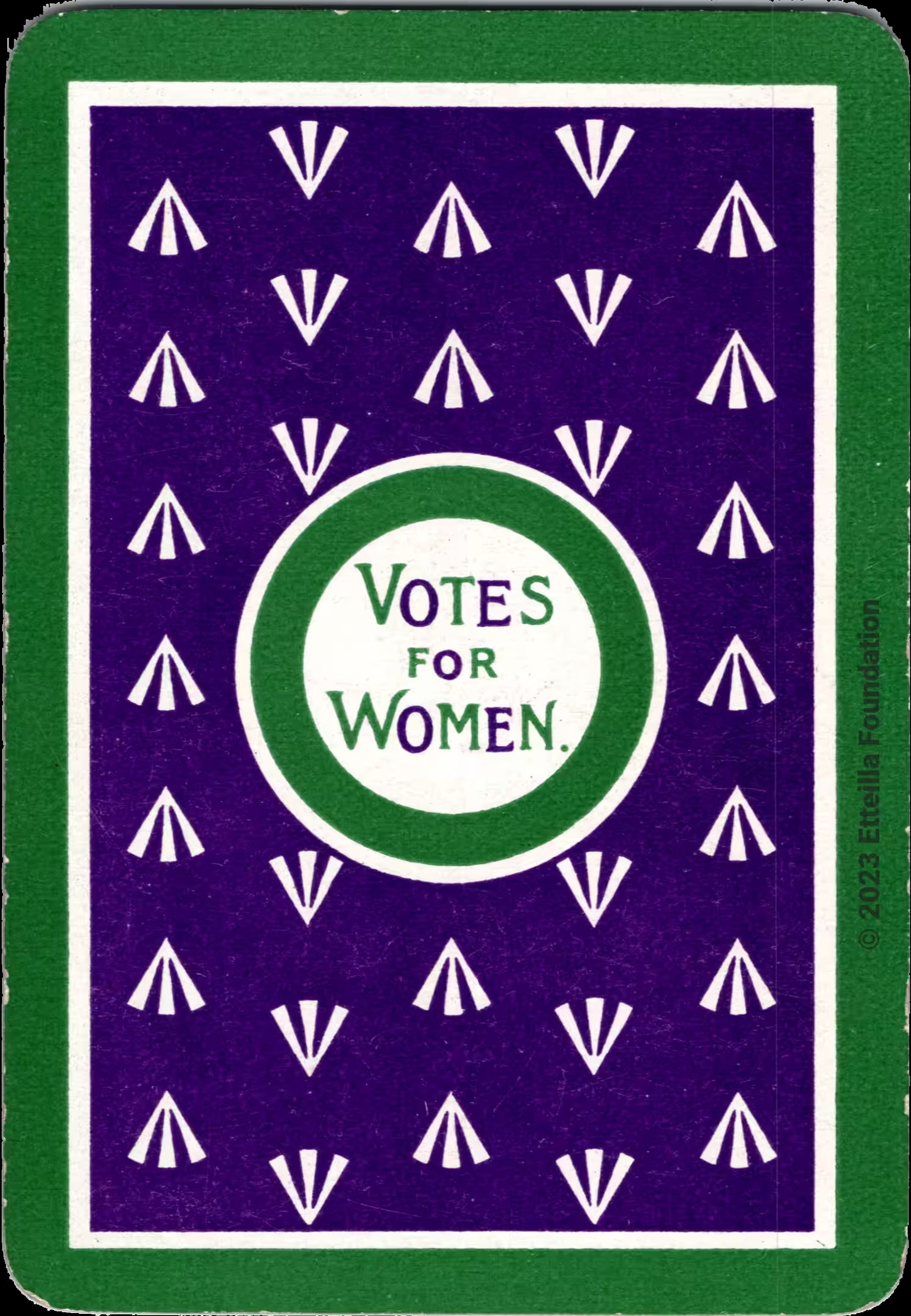
De La Rue playing cards back from 1910

Women's right to vote in the United Kingdom was established through acts of Parliament in 1918 and 1928. In 1832, the Representation of the People Act (or First Reform Act) had passed into law, extending the franchise to various groups of property-owning men, thus legally excluding women.

In 1872, the fight for women's suffrage became a national movement with the formation of the National Society for Women's Suffrage and later the more influential National Union of Women's Suffrage Societies (NUWSS). As well as in England, women's suffrage movements in Wales, Scotland and Ireland gained momentum. The movements shifted sentiments in favour of women's suffrage by 1906. At this time a militant campaign began with the formation of the Women's Social and Political Union (WSPU).

The outbreak of the First World War in 1914 led to a suspension of party politics, including the militant suffragette campaigns. Lobbying did take place quietly. In 1918 a coalition government passed the Representation of the People Act 1918, enfranchising all men over 21, as well as all women over the age of 30 who met minimum property qualifications, in both Britain and Ireland. This act was the first to include almost all adult men in the political system and began the inclusion of women, extending the franchise by 5.6 million men and 8.4 million women. In 1928 the Conservative government passed the Representation of the People (Equal Franchise) Act 1928 equalising the franchise to all persons, male and female, over the age of 21.

== Background ==
Until the Great Reform Act 1832 specified 'male persons', a few women had been able to vote in parliamentary elections through property ownership, although this was rare. In local government elections, women lost the right to vote under the Municipal Corporations Act 1835. Unmarried women ratepayers received the right to vote in the Municipal Franchise Act 1869. This right was confirmed in the Local Government Act 1894 and extended to include some married women, making over 729,000 women eligible to vote in local elections in England and Wales. By 1900, more than one million women were registered to vote in local government elections in England. Women were also included in the suffrage on the same terms as men (i.e., all parishioners over 21) in the unique set of border polls carried out from 1915 to 1916 under the Welsh Church Act 1914. These were held to determine whether the residents of parishes which straddled the political border between England and Wales wished their ecclesiastical parishes and churches to remain with the Church of England or to join the disestablished Church in Wales when it was set up. The Welsh Church Act 1914 had required the Welsh Church Commissioners to ascertain the views of the "parishioners", and they decided "to allow a voice to all persons, male or female, of 21 years of age or over". The polls are therefore one of the earliest examples, if not the earliest, of an official poll being carried out in the United Kingdom under a system of universal adult suffrage, though also permitting non-resident ratepayers of either gender to vote.

Both before and after the Reform Act 1832 there were some who advocated that women should have the right to vote in parliamentary elections. After the enactment of the Reform Act 1832, the MP Henry Hunt argued that any woman who was single, a taxpayer and had sufficient property should be allowed to vote. One such wealthy woman, Mary Smith, was used in this speech as an example.

The Chartist Movement, which began in the late 1830s, has also been suggested to have included supporters of female suffrage. There is some evidence to suggest William Lovett, one of the authors of the People's Charter wished to include female suffrage as one of the campaign's demands but chose not to on the grounds that this would delay the implementation of the charter. Although there were female Chartists, they largely worked toward universal male suffrage. At this time most women did not have aspirations to gain the vote.

There is a poll book from 1843 that clearly shows thirty women's names among those who voted. These women were playing an active role in the election. On the roll, the wealthiest female elector was Grace Brown, a butcher. Due to the high rates that she paid, Grace Brown was entitled to four votes.

Lilly Maxwell cast a high-profile vote in Britain in 1867 after the Great Reform Act 1832. Maxwell, a shop owner, met the property qualifications that otherwise would have made her eligible to vote had she been male. In error, her name had been added to the election register and on that basis she succeeded in voting in a by-election – her vote was later declared illegal by the Court of Common Pleas. The case gave women's suffrage campaigners great publicity.

Outside pressure for women's suffrage was at this time diluted by feminist issues in general. Women's rights were becoming increasingly prominent in the 1850s as some women in higher social spheres refused to obey the gender roles dictated to them. Feminist goals at this time included the right to sue an ex-husband after divorce (achieved in 1857) and the right for married women to own property (fully achieved in 1882 after some concession by the government in 1870).

The issue of parliamentary reform declined along with the Chartists after 1848 and only reemerged with the election of John Stuart Mill in 1865. He stood for office showing direct support for female suffrage and was an MP in the run up to the second Reform Act.

== Early suffragist societies ==
In the same year that John Stuart Mill was elected (1865), the first ladies' discussion society, Kensington Society, was formed, debating whether women should be involved in public affairs. Although a society for suffrage was proposed, this was turned down on the grounds that it might be taken over by extremists.

Later that year Leigh Smith Bodichon formed the first Women's Suffrage Committee and within a fortnight collected nearly 1,500 signatures in favour of female suffrage in advance to the second Reform Bill.

The Manchester Society for Women's Suffrage was founded in February 1867. Its secretary, Lydia Becker, wrote letters both to Prime Minister Benjamin Disraeli and to The Spectator. She was also involved with the London group, and organised the collection of more signatures. Lydia Becker reluctantly agreed to exclude married women from the "Married Women's Property Act" reform demand.

In June the London group split, partly a result of party allegiance, and partly the result of tactical issues. Conservative members wished to move slowly to avoid alarming public opinion, while Liberals generally opposed this apparent dilution of political conviction. As a result, Helen Taylor founded the London National Society for Women's Suffrage, which set up strong links with Manchester and Edinburgh. In Scotland one of the earliest societies was the Edinburgh National Society for Women's Suffrage.

Although these early splits left the movement divided and sometimes leaderless, it allowed Lydia Becker to have a stronger influence. The suffragists were known as the parliamentarians.

In Ireland, Isabella Tod, a Scottish-born campaigner for women’s civil and political equality, established the North of Ireland Women's Suffrage Society in 1873 (from 1909, still based in Belfast, the Irish WSS). Determined lobbying by the WSS, and the support of local MP William Johnston, ensured the 1887 Act creating a new municipal franchise for Belfast (a city in which women predominated due to heavy employment in mills) conferred the vote on "persons" rather than men. This was eleven years before women elsewhere Ireland gained the vote in local government elections.

The Dublin Women's Suffrage Association was established in 1874. As well as campaigning for women's suffrage, it sought to advance women's position in local government. In 1898, it changed its name to the Irish Women's Suffrage and Local Government Association.

== Early legislative efforts ==
In 1868, John Stuart Mill brought to Parliament a petition for female suffrage with 21,557 signatures. In 1870, Jacob Bright introduced the Women's Disabilities Removal Bill which would have extended the parliamentary franchise to women on the same terms as men. In May 1871, the bill was defeated in the Commons by a division of 220 to 151. With varying degrees cross-party support, private member's bills caused the subject to be debated in the House of Commons again in 1872, 1873, 1875, 1876, 1877, 1878, 1879, 1883, 1884 (twice), 1886, 1892, and 1897.

In 1910, 1911, and 1912, there were three "Conciliation bills" which, suffrage equality, offered women a more restrictive property-qualified vote. The 1912 bill was defeated by 208 to 222. The Women's Social and Political Union blamed Prime Minister Asquith, as the eight members of the Liberal Government whose votes against the measure sealed its fate.

== Formation of a national movement ==
=== Women's political groups ===
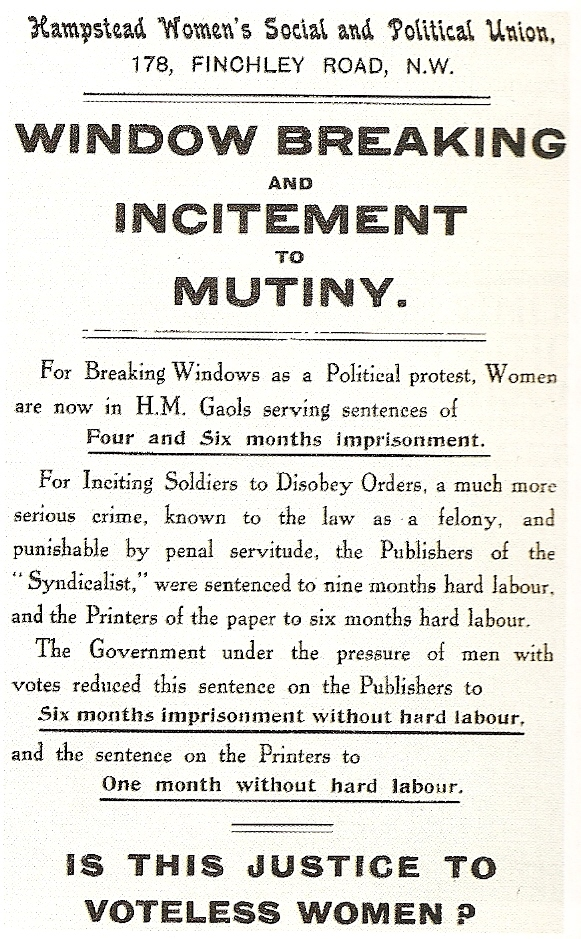
A handbill complaining about sexual discrimination during the movement.

Although women's political party groups were not formed with the aim to achieve women's suffrage, they did have two key effects. Firstly, they showed women who were members to be competent in the political arena and as this became clear, secondly, it brought the concept of female suffrage closer to acceptance.

==== Primrose League ====
The Primrose League (1883–2004) was set up to promote Conservative values through social events and supporting the community. As women were able to join, this gave females of all classes the ability to mix with local and national political figures. Many also had important roles such as bringing voters to the polls. This removed segregation and promoted political literacy among women. The League did not promote women's suffrage as one of its objectives.

==== Women's Liberal Associations ====
Although there is evidence to suggest that they were originally formed to promote female franchise (the first being in Bristol in 1881), WLAs often did not hold such an agenda. They operated independently from the male groups, and did become more active when they came under the control of the Women's Liberal Federation, and canvassed all classes for support of women's suffrage and against domination.

There was significant support for woman suffrage in the Liberal Party, which was in power after 1905, but a handful of leaders, especially H. H. Asquith, blocked all efforts in Parliament.

=== Pressure groups ===
The campaign first developed into a national movement in the 1870s. At this point, all campaigners were suffragists, not suffragettes. Up until 1903, all campaigning took the constitutional approach. It was after the defeat of the first Women's Suffrage Bill that the Manchester and London committees joined together to gain wider support. The main methods of doing so at this time involved lobbying MPs to put forward Private Member's Bills. However such bills rarely pass and so this was an ineffective way of actually achieving the vote.

In 1868, local groups amalgamated to form a series of close-knit groups with the founding of the National Society for Women's Suffrage (NSWS). This is notable as the first attempt to create a unified front to propose women's suffrage, but had little effect due to several splits, once again weakening the campaign.

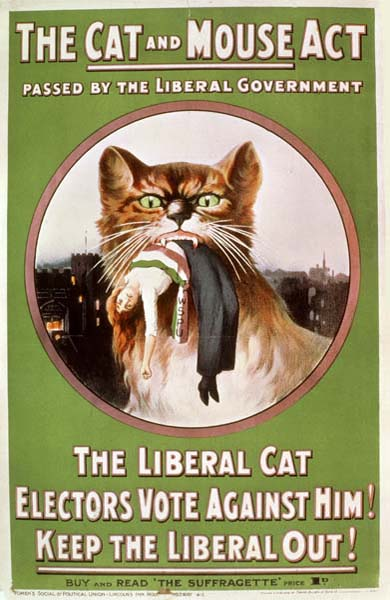
WSPU poster 1914

Up until 1897, the campaign stayed at this relatively ineffective level. Campaigners came predominantly from the landed classes and joined together on a small scale only. In 1897 the National Union of Women's Suffrage Societies (NUWSS) was founded by Millicent Fawcett. This society linked smaller groups together and also put pressure on non-supportive MPs using various peaceful methods.

=== Pankhursts and suffragettes ===
Founded in 1903, the Women’s Social and Political Union (WSPU) was tightly controlled by the three Pankhursts, Emmeline Pankhurst (1858–1928), and her daughters Christabel Pankhurst (1880–1958) and Sylvia Pankhurst (1882–1960). It specialized in highly visible publicity campaigns such as large parades. This had the effect of energizing all dimensions of the suffrage movement. While there was a majority of support for suffrage in parliament, the ruling Liberal Party refused to allow a vote on the issue; the result of which was an escalation in the suffragette campaign. The WSPU, in contrast to its allies, embarked on a campaign of violence to publicize the issue, even to the detriment of its own aims.

The Cat and Mouse Act was passed by Parliament in an attempt to prevent suffragettes from becoming martyrs in prison. It provided for the release of those whose hunger strikes and forced feeding had brought them sickness, as well as their re-imprisonment once they had recovered. The result was even greater publicity for the cause.

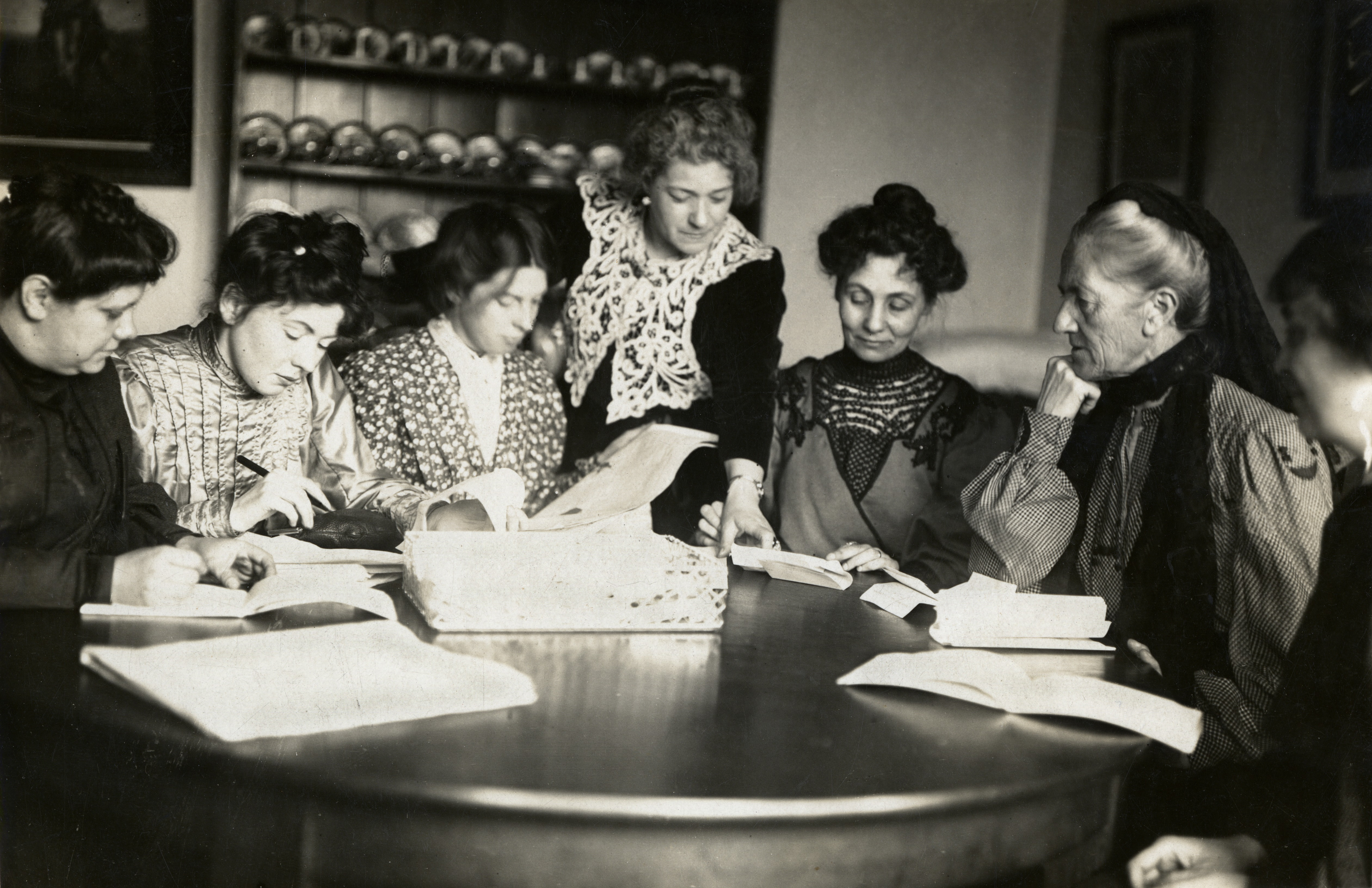
WSPU leaders Flora Drummond, Christabel Pankhurst, Annie Kenney, Emmeline Pankhurst, and Charlotte Despard, c. 1906

The tactics of the WSPU included shouting down speakers, hunger strikes, stone-throwing, window-smashing, and arson of unoccupied churches and country houses. In Belfast, when in 1914 the Ulster Unionist Council appeared to renege on an earlier commitment to women's suffrage, the WSPU's Dorothy Evans (a friend of the Pankhursts) declared an end to "the truce we have held in Ulster." In the months that followed WSPU militants (including Elizabeth Bell, the first woman in Ireland to qualify as a doctor and gynaecologist) were implicated in a series of arson attacks on Unionist-owned buildings and on male recreational and sports facilities. In July 1914, in a plan hatched with Evans, Lillian Metge, who was previously part of a 200-strong deputation that charged George V as he entered Buckingham Palace, bombed Lisburn Cathedral.

Historian Martin Pugh says, "militancy clearly damaged the cause." Whitfield says, "the overall effect of the suffragette militancy, was to set back the cause of women's suffrage." Historian Harold Smith, citing historian Sandra Holton, has argued that by 1913 WSPU gave priority to militancy rather than obtaining the vote. Their battle with Liberals had become a "kind of holy war, so important that it could not be called off even if continuing it prevented suffrage reform. This preoccupation with the struggle distinguished the WSPU from that by the NUWSS, which remained focused on obtaining women's suffrage."

Smith concludes:

Although non-historians often assumed the WSPU was primarily responsible for obtaining women's suffrage, historians are much more skeptical about its contribution. It is generally agreed that the WSPU revitalized the suffrage campaign initially, but that its escalation of militancy after 1912 impeded reform. Recent studies have shifted from claiming that the WSPU was responsible for women's suffrage to portraying it as an early form of radical feminism that sought to liberate women from a male-centered gender system.

== First World War ==
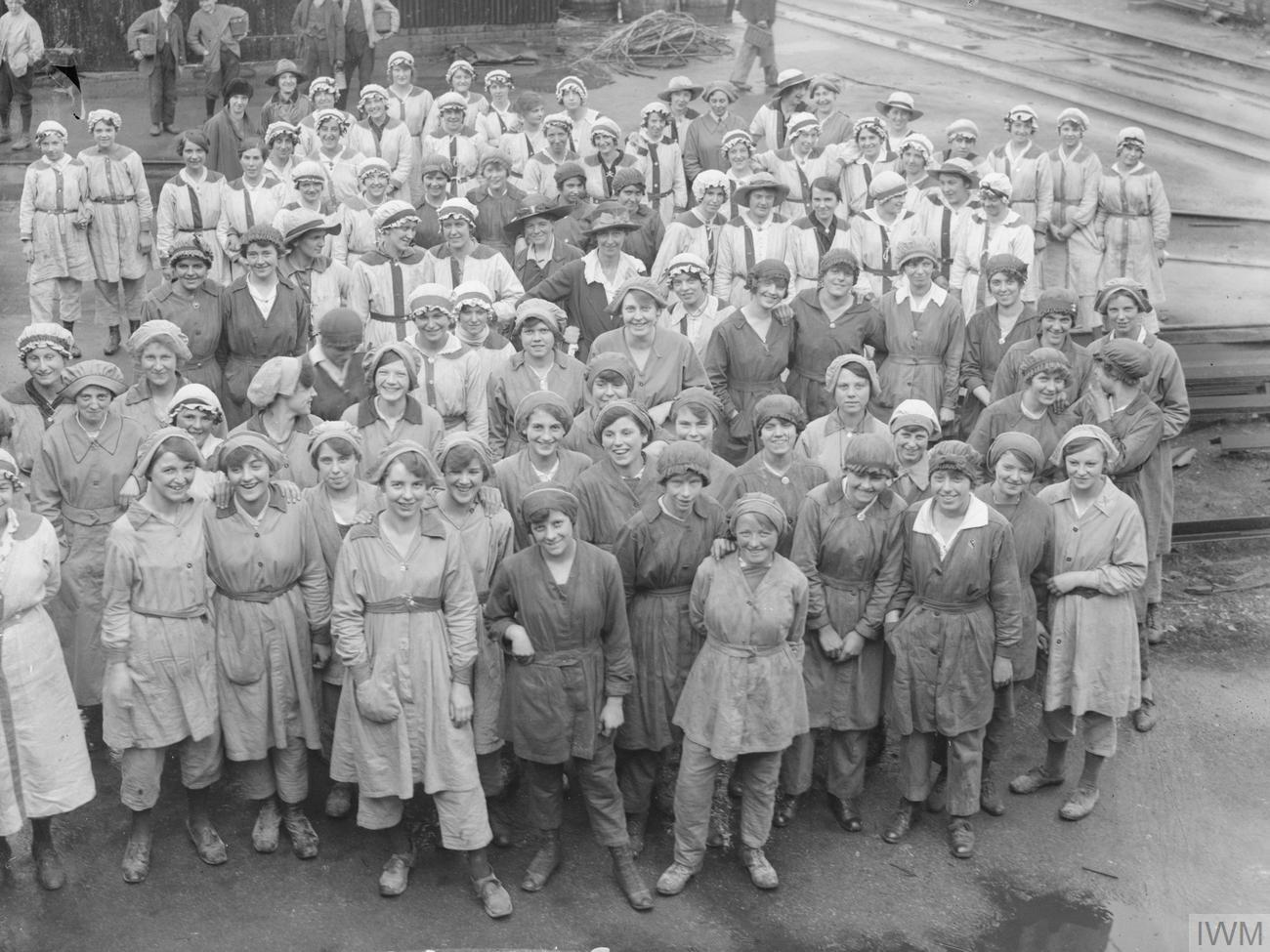
Women employees working in a Manchester chemical factory, September 1918

=== Division over a war-time political truce ===
The greater suffrage efforts halted with the outbreak of World War I. With seemingly little consultation, Emmeline and Christabel Pankhurst announced that the WSPU would abandon its campaigns in favour of patriotic support for King and Country. to which the government responded with a general amnesty for jailed militants. The WSPU stopped publishing The Suffragette, and in April 1915 it launched a new journal, Britannia, and lent support to the White Feather Campaign.

There were WPSU veterans who rejected the idea a wartime political truce. At the outbreak of the war, in The Irish Citizen, the paper of the pacifist Hanna Sheehy-Skeffington's Dublin-based Irish Women's Franchise League, Elizabeth McCracken (the feminist writer "L. A. M. Priestley") asked "Shall Suffrage Cease?" She denounced the hypocrisy of men who, having subjected militant suffragists to a campaign "vituperation and invective", now, "with the most unblushing effrontery", asked women to approve "the most aggravated form of militancy—war". "What country is theirs", she asked, "who are defrauded of citizenship".

In 1915, McCracken invited Sylvia Pankhurst to Belfast (where Evans, released under amnesty, also reaffirmed her commitment to continue the struggle for equal rights) to speak in support of equal pay for women doing war work. It was a demand Pankhurst championed along with universal food rationing, debt relief and improved allowances for soldiers wives. By helping to shift some the costs of the war off the back of women and poor, she believed that these were measures that might hasten its end. In the meantime, her Women's Suffrage Federation in London's East End created co-operative workshops and ran food banks. Before war's end, the organisation was renamed the Workers' Socialist Federation, reflecting Sylvia Pankhurst's increasingly left-leaning, revolutionary course.

=== Parliament expands suffrage 1918 ===
During the war, a select group of parliamentary leaders decided on a policy that would expand the suffrage to all men over the age of 21, and 'propertied women' - women married under law to a man - over the age of 30. Asquith, an opponent, was replaced as prime minister in late 1916 by David Lloyd George who had, for his first ten years as an MP, argued against women having the franchise.

During the war there was a serious shortage of able-bodied men and women were able to take on many of the traditionally male roles. With the approval of the trade unions, "dilution" was agreed upon. Complicated factory jobs handled by skilled men were diluted or simplified so that they could be handled by less skilled men and women. The result was a large increase in women workers, concentrated in munitions industries of highest priority to winning the war. This led to an increased societal understanding of what work women were capable of.. Some believe that the franchise was partially granted in 1918 because of a decline in the anti-suffrage hostility that had been caused by pre-war militant tactics.

Until this point suffrage was based on occupational qualifications of men. Millions of women were now meeting those occupational qualifications, which in any case were so old-fashioned that the consensus was to remove them. For example, a male voter who joined the Army might lose the right to vote. In early 1916, suffragist organizations privately agreed to downplay their differences, and resolve that any legislation increasing the number of votes should also enfranchise women. Local government officials proposed a simplification of the old system of franchise and registration, and the Labour cabinet member in the new coalition government, Arthur Henderson, called for universal suffrage, with an age cutoff of 21 for men and 25 for women. Most male political leaders showed anxiety about having a female majority in the new electorate. Parliament turned over the issue to a new Speakers Conference, a special committee from all parties from both houses, chaired by the Speaker. They began meeting in October 1916, in secret. A majority of 15 to 6 supported votes for some women; by 12 to 10, it agreed on a higher age cut off for women. Women leaders accepted a cutoff age of 30 in order to get the vote for most women.

Finally in 1918, Parliament passed an act granting the vote to women over the age of 30 who were householders, the wives of householders, occupiers of property with an annual rent of £5, and graduates of British universities. About 8.4 million women gained the vote. In November 1918, the Parliament (Qualification of Women) Act 1918 was passed, allowing women to be elected into the House of Commons. The first general election in which women could vote took place on 14 December 1918.

By 1928 the consensus was that votes for women had been successful. With the Conservative Party in full control in 1928, it passed the Representation of the People (Equal Franchise) Act that extended the voting franchise to all women aged 21, granting women the vote on the same terms as men.

== Women in prominent roles ==
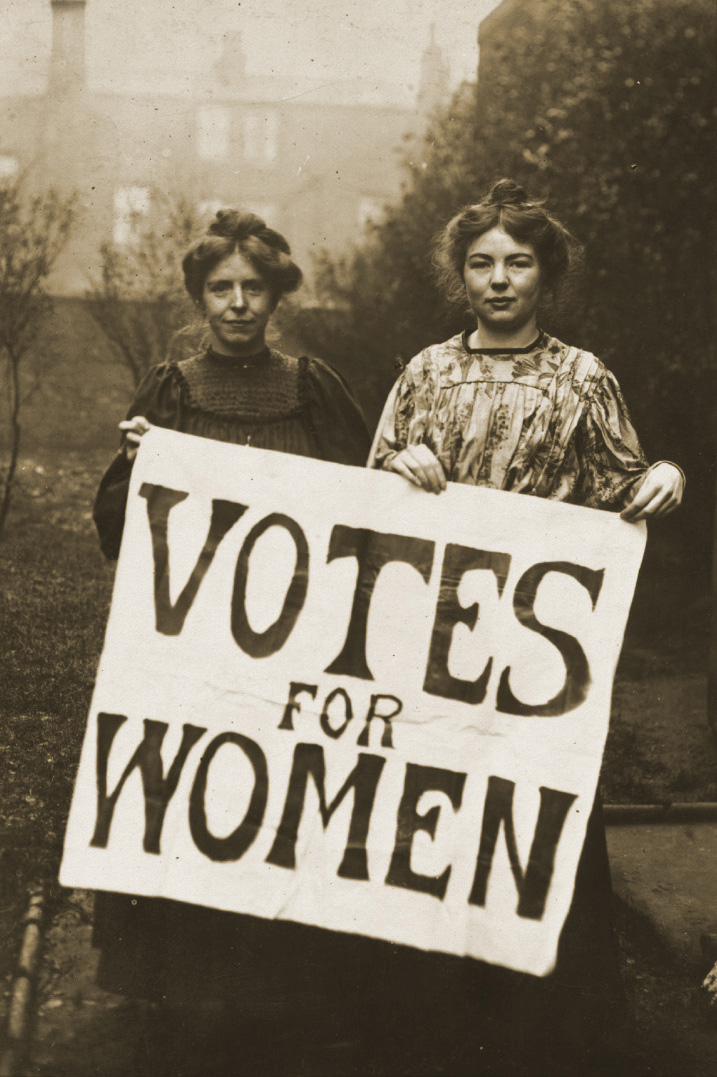
WSPU founders Annie Kenney and Christabel Pankhurst

Emmeline Pankhurst was a key figure gaining intense media coverage of the women's suffrage movement. Pankhurst, alongside her two daughters, Christabel and Sylvia, founded and led the Women's Social and Political Union, an organisation that was focused on direct action to win the vote. Her husband, Richard Pankhurst, also supported women suffrage ideas since he was the author of the first British woman suffrage bill and the Married Women’s Property Acts in 1870 and 1882. After her husband’s death, Emmeline decided to move to the forefront of the suffrage battle. Along with her two daughters, Christabel Pankhurst and Sylvia Pankhurst, she joined the National Union of Women’s Suffrage Societies (NUWSS). With her experience with this organisation, Emmeline founded the Women's Franchise League in 1889 and the Women’s Social and Political Union (WSPU) in 1903. Frustrated with years of government inactivity and false promises, the WSPU adopted a militant stance, which was so influential it was later imported into suffrage struggles worldwide, most notably by Alice Paul in the United States. After many years of struggle and adversity, women finally gained suffrage but Emmeline died shortly after this.

Another key figure was Millicent Fawcett. She had a peaceful approach to issues presented to the organisations and the way to get points across to society. She supported the Married Women's Property Act and the social purity campaign. Two events influenced her to become even more involved: her husband’s death and the division of the suffrage movement over the issue of affiliation with political parties. Millicent, who supported staying independent of political parties, made sure that the parts separated came together to become stronger by working together. Because of her actions, she was made president of the NUWSS. In 1910–1912, she supported a bill to give vote rights to single and widowed females of a household. By supporting the British in World War I, she thought women would be recognised as a prominent part of Europe and deserved basic rights such as voting. Millicent Fawcett came from a radical family. Her sister was Elizabeth Garrett Anderson an English physician and feminist, and the first woman to gain a medical qualification in Britain. Elizabeth was elected mayor of Aldeburgh in 1908 and gave speeches for suffrage.

Emily Davies became an editor of a feminist publication, Englishwoman's Journal. She expressed her feminist ideas on paper and was also a major supporter and influential figure during the twentieth century. In addition to suffrage, she supported more rights for women such as access to education. She wrote works and had power with words. She wrote texts such as Thoughts on Some Questions Relating to Women in 1910 and Higher Education for Women in 1866. She was a large supporter in the times where organisations were trying to reach people for a change. With her was a friend named Barbara Bodichon who also published articles and books such as Women and Work (1857), Enfranchisement of Women (1866), and Objections to the Enfranchisement of Women (1866), and American Diary in 1872.

Mary Gawthorpe was an early suffragette who left teaching to fight for women's voting rights. She was imprisoned after heckling Winston Churchill. She left England after her release, eventually emigrating to the United States and settling in New York. She worked in the trade union movement and in 1920 became a full-time official of the Amalgamated Clothing Workers Union. In 2003, Mary's nieces donated her papers to New York University.

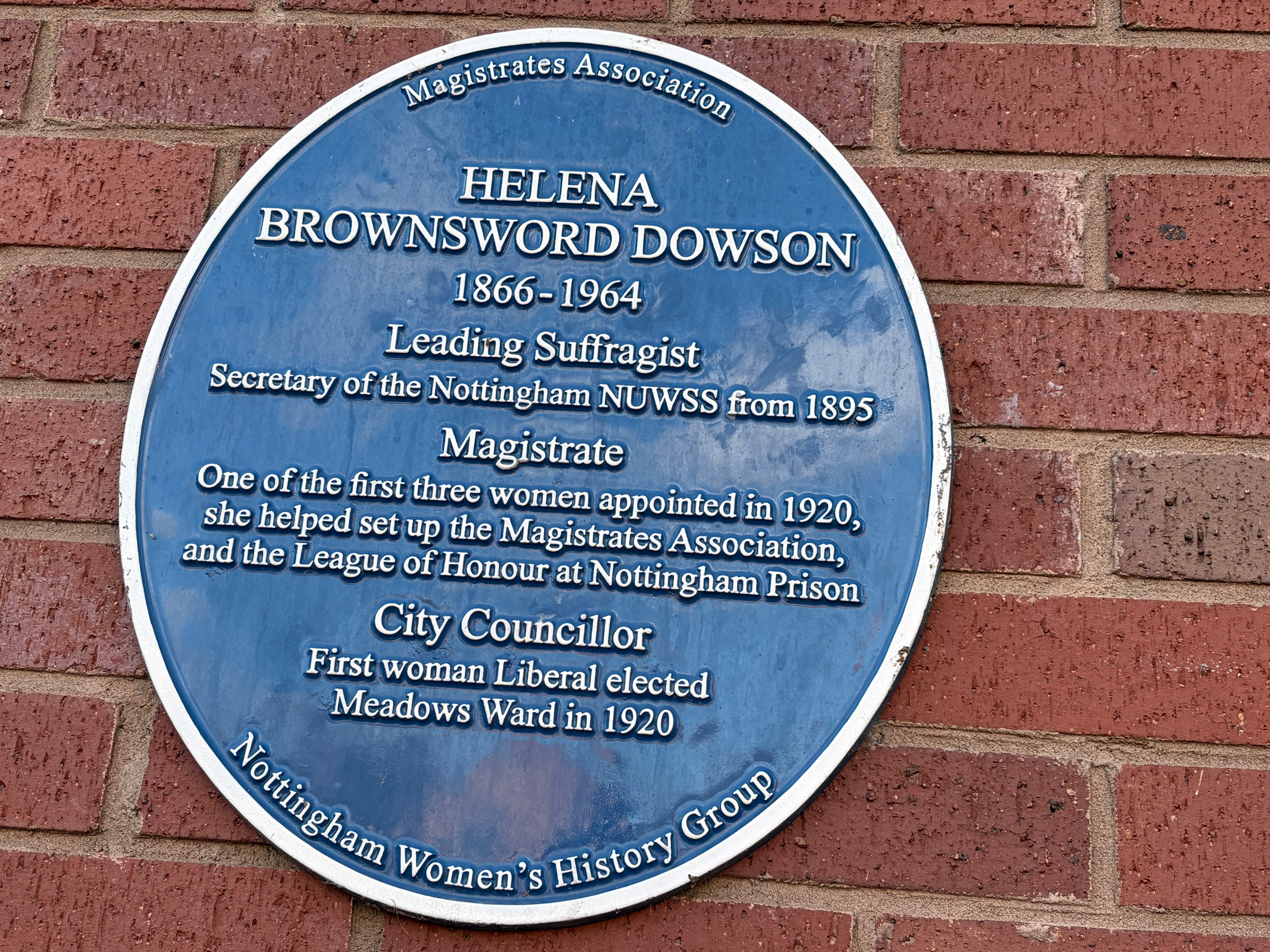
Plaque to honour Helena Brownsword Dowson. Photograph

Helena Brownsword Dowson (1866-1964) Leading Suffragist, City Councillor and Magistrate. Lived in Nottingham and was Secretary of the Suffrage Society (1911, Census). Her Mother in law was Alice Dowson and her aunt (by marriage was Hilda Dowson, together these women were active in Nottingham Women’s Suffrage; Alice Dowson had attended a very early Nottingham suffrage meeting in 1872. Helena Brownsword Dowson and Jessie Craigen began the campaign for a grand demonstration in the Albert Hall, Nottingham (1880) with a meeting at the Morley club and the previous day Helena was a speaker at the Newark town hall and also on the 22nd., November 1880 she was a speaker at a drawing room meeting of Mr and Mrs George Cowne. There is a plaque to honour the work of HBD as a suffragist and magistrate - mounted on the walls of the Magistrates Court, Nottingham, alongside another that honours her and other women.

== Male suffragists ==
Males were also present in the suffrage movement, including in Parliament and militant groups.

=== Laurence Housman ===
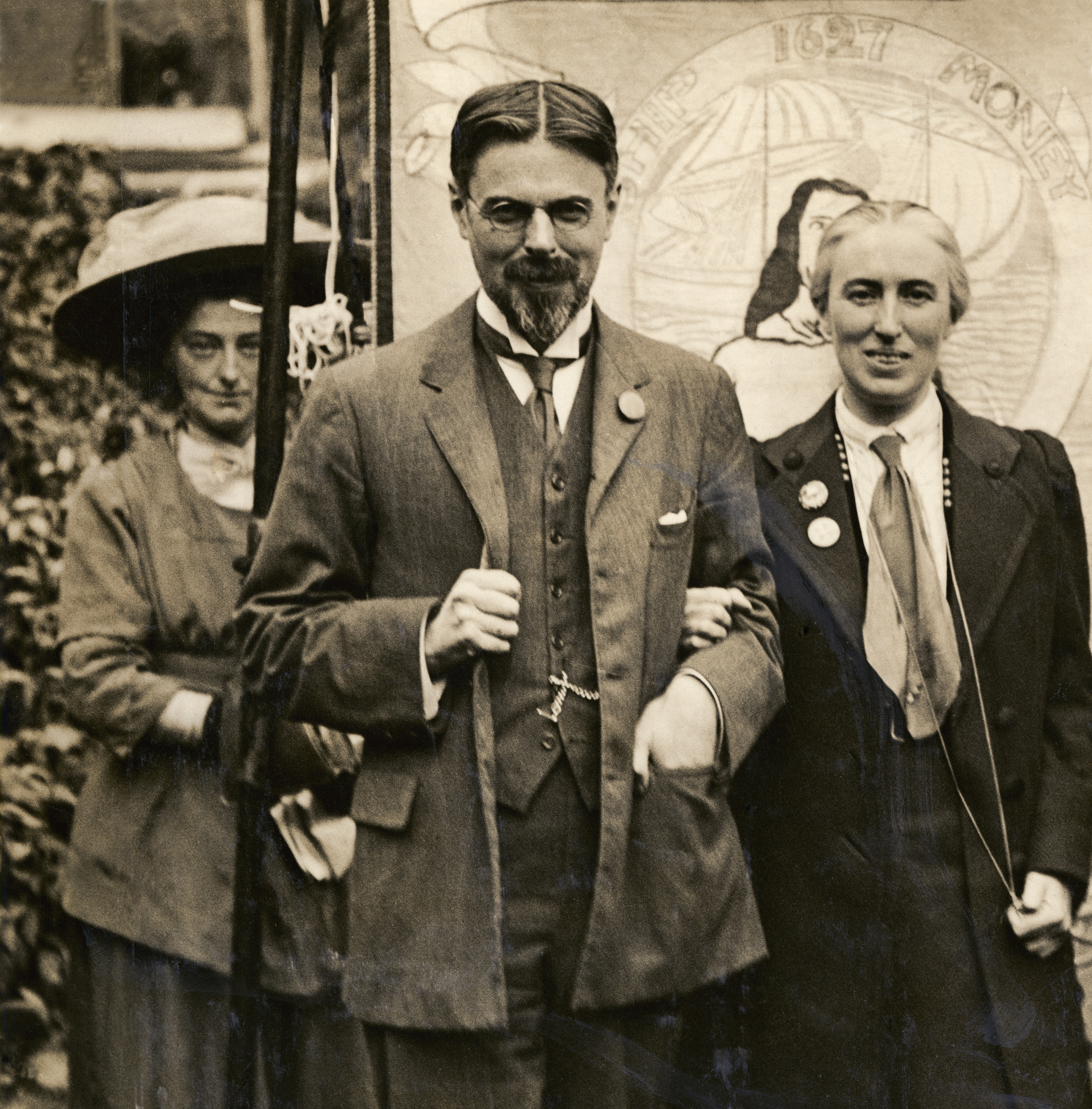
Laurence Housman and his sister, Clemence Housman, in front of a suffrage banner, circa 1910

Laurence Housman was a male feminist who devoted himself to the suffrage movement. Most of his contributions were through creating art, such as propaganda, with the intent of helping women in the movement to better express themselves, influencing people to join the movement and informing people about particular suffrage events such as the 1911 Census protest. He and his sister, Clemence Housman, created a studio called the Suffrage Atelier which aimed to create propaganda for the suffrage movement. This was significant because he produced a space for women to create propaganda to better aid the suffrage movement and, at the same time, earn money by selling the art. Also, he created propaganda such as the Anti-Suffrage Alphabet, and wrote for many women's newspapers. Additionally, he also influenced other men to aid the movement. For example, he formed the Men’s League for Women’s Suffrage with Israel Zangwill, Henry Nevinson and Henry Brailsford, hoping to inspire other men to participate in the movement.

== Legacy ==
Whitfield concludes that the militant campaign had some positive effects in terms of attracting enormous publicity, and forcing the moderates to better organise themselves, while also stimulating the organization of the antis. He concludes:

The overall effect of the suffragette militancy, however, was to set back the cause of women's suffrage. For women to gain the right to vote it was necessary to demonstrate that they had public opinion on their side, to build and consolidate a parliamentary majority in favour of women's suffrage and to persuade or pressure the government to introduce its own franchise reform. None of these objectives was achieved.

The Emmeline and Christabel Pankhurst Memorial in London was first dedicated to Emmeline Pankhurst in 1930, with a plaque added for Christabel Pankhurst in 1958.

To commemorate the 100th anniversary of Women being given the right to vote, a statue of Millicent Fawcett was erected in Parliament Square, London in 2018. The photo colouriser Tom Marshall released a series of photos to mark the 100th anniversary of the vote, including an image of suffragettes Annie Kenney and Christabel Pankhurst, which appeared on The Daily Telegraph front page on 6 February 2018.

== Timeline ==
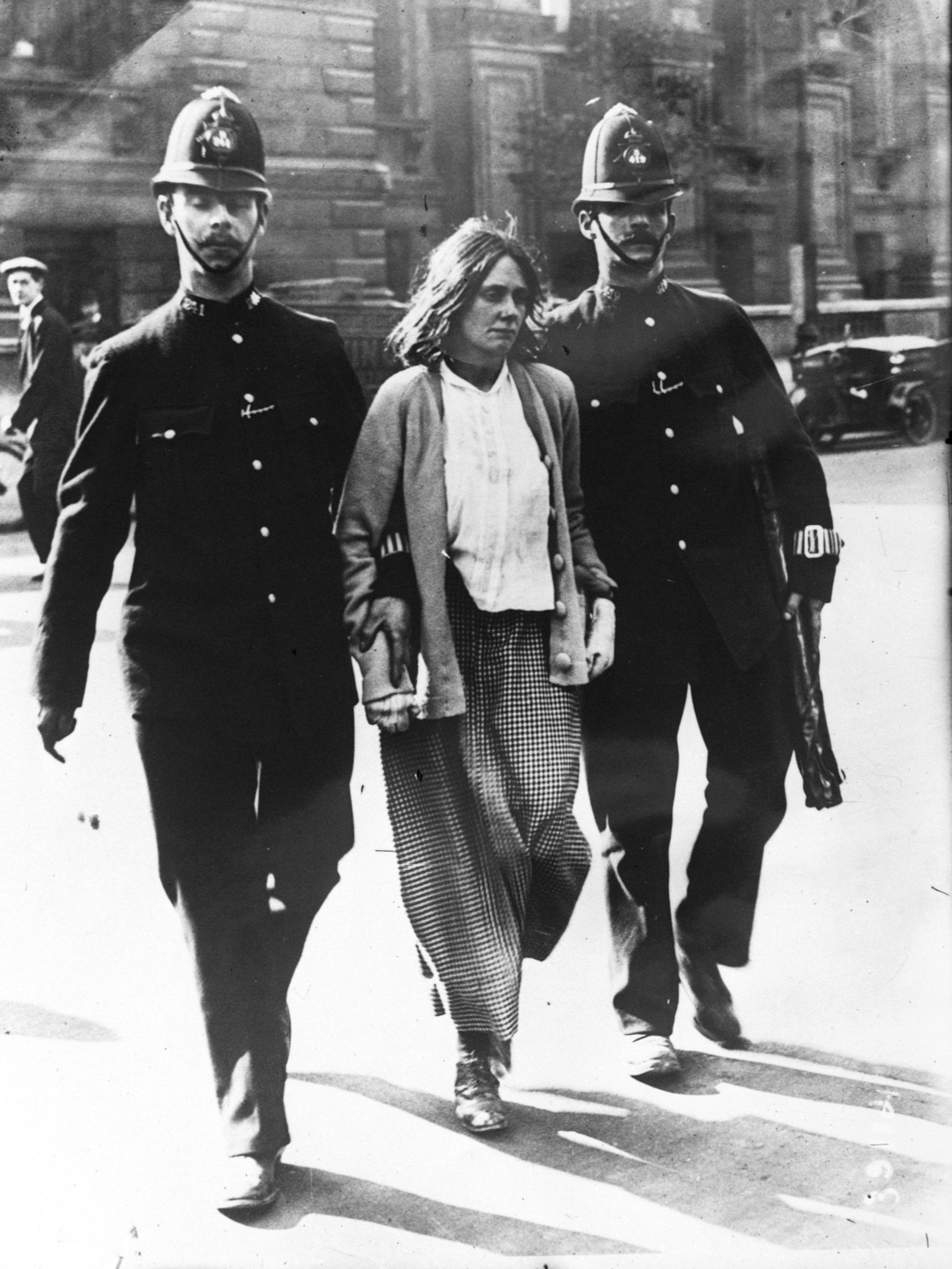
A suffragette arrested in the street by two police officers in London in 1914

- 1818: Jeremy Bentham advocates female suffrage in his book A Plan for Parliamentary Reform. The Vestries Act 1818 allowed some single women to vote in parish vestry elections.
- 1832: Reform Act 1832 – confirmed the exclusion of women from the electorate.
- 1851: The Sheffield Female Political Association is founded and submits a petition calling for women's suffrage to the House of Lords.
- 1864: The Contagious Diseases Prevention Act 1864 is passed in England, which is intended to control venereal disease by having prostitutes and women believed to be prostitutes locked away in hospitals for examination and treatment. When information broke to the general public about the shocking stories of brutality and vice in these hospitals, Josephine Butler launched a campaign to get it repealed. Many have since argued that Butler's campaign destroyed the conspiracy of silence around sexuality and forced women to act in protection of others of their sex. In doing so, clear linkages emerge between the suffrage movement and Butler's campaign.
- 1865: John Stuart Mill elected as an MP showing direct support for women's suffrage.
- 1867: Second Reform Act – Male franchise extended to 2.5 million.
- 1869: Municipal Franchise Act 1869 gives single women ratepayers the right to vote in local elections.
- 1883: Conservative Primrose League formed.
- 1884: Third Reform Act – Male electorate doubled to 5 million.
- 1889: Women's Franchise League established.
- 1894: Local Government Act 1894 (women could vote in local elections, become District Councillors [though not their Chairmen], Poor Law Guardians, act on School Boards)
- 1894: The publication of C. C. Stopes's British Freewomen, staple reading for the suffrage movement for decades.
- 1897: National Union of Women's Suffrage Societies NUWSS formed (led by Millicent Fawcett).
- 1903: Women's Social and Political Union WSPU is formed (led by Emmeline Pankhurst)
- 1904: Militancy begins. Emmeline Pankhurst interrupts a Liberal Party meeting.
- February 1907: NUWSS "Mud March" – largest open air demonstration ever held (at that point) – over 3000 women took part. In this year, women were admitted to the register to vote in and stand for election to principal local authorities.
- 1907: The Artists' Suffrage League founded
- 1907: The Women's Freedom League founded
- 1908: Actresses Franchise League founded
- 1908: Women Writers' Suffrage League founded
- 1908: in November of this year, Elizabeth Garrett Anderson, a member of the small municipal borough of Aldeburgh, Suffolk, was selected as mayor of that town, the first woman to so serve.
- 1907, 1912, 1914: major splits in the WSPU
- 1905, 1908, 1913: Three phases of WSPU militancy (Civil Disobedience; Destruction of Public Property; Arson/Bombings)
- 5 July 1909: Marion Wallace Dunlop went on the first hunger strike – was released after 91 hours of fasting
- 1909 The Women's Tax Resistance League founded
- September 1909: Force-feeding introduced to hunger strikers in English prisons
- 1910: Lady Constance Lytton disguised herself as a working-class seamstress, Jane Wharton, and was arrested and endured force feeding that cut down her life span considerably
- February 1910: Cross-Party Conciliation Committee (54 MPs). Conciliation Bill (that would enfranchise women) passed its 2nd reading by a majority of 109 but H. H. Asquith refused to give it more parliamentary time
- November 1910: Asquith changed the Bill to enfranchise more men instead of women
- 18 November 1910: Black Friday
- October 1912: George Lansbury, Labour MP, resigned his seat in support of women's suffrage
- February 1913: David Lloyd George's house blown up by WSPU despite his support for women's suffrage.
- April 1913: Cat and Mouse Act passed, allowing hunger-striking prisoners to be released when their health was threatened and then re-arrested when they had recovered. The first suffragist to be released under this act was Hugh Franklin and the second was his soon-to-be wife Elsie Duval
- 4 June 1913: Emily Davison walked in front of, and was subsequently trampled and killed by, the King’s Horse at The Derby.
- 13 March 1914: Mary Richardson slashed the Rokeby Venus painted by Diego Velázquez in the National Gallery with an axe, protesting that she was maiming a beautiful woman just as the government was maiming Emmeline Pankhurst with force feeding
- 4 August 1914: World War declared in Britain. WSPU activity immediately ceased. NUWSS activity continued peacefully – the Birmingham branch of the organisation continued to lobby Parliament and write letters to MPs.
- 1915–16: Border polls under Welsh Church Act 1914 held under universal adult suffrage.
- 6 February 1918: The Representation of the People Act 1918 enfranchised women over the age of 30 who were either a member or married to a member of the Local Government Register. About 8.4 million women gained the vote.
- 21 November 1918: the Parliament (Qualification of Women) Act 1918 was passed, allowing women to be elected to Parliament.
- 1928: Women in England, Wales and Scotland received the vote on the same terms as men (over the age of 21, without property requirements) as a result of the Representation of the People Act 1928.
- 1968–1969: The Electoral Law Act (Northern Ireland) and the Representation of the People Act 1969 reduced the voting age to 18 for men and women alike
- 1973: The fully enfranchised Northern Irish local elections of May 1973 saw the first time all government elected officials across the UK were elected under universal suffrage.

== See also ==
- Anti-suffragism
- Feminism in the United Kingdom
- List of suffragette bombings
- List of suffragists and suffragettes
- List of women's rights activists
- Lobbying in the United Kingdom
- The Men's Political Union for Women's Enfranchisement
- Northern Men's Federation for Women's Suffrage
- Suffrage jewellery
- Suffragette bombing and arson campaign
- Women's suffrage in Scotland
- The Women's Library (London)
- Timeline of women's suffrage
- Women in the House of Commons of the United Kingdom
- Women's suffrage activism in Leigh
- Women's suffrage in India
- Women's suffrage in the Cayman Islands

== Primary sources ==
- Lewis, J., ed. Before the Vote Was Won: Arguments for and Against Women's Suffrage (1987)
- McPhee, C., and A. Fitzgerald, eds. The Non--Violent Militant: Selected Writings of Teresa Billington-Greig (1987)
- Marcus, J., ed. Suffrage and the Pankhursts (1987)
