= Winifred Carney =

Suffragist, trade unionist and Irish independence activist

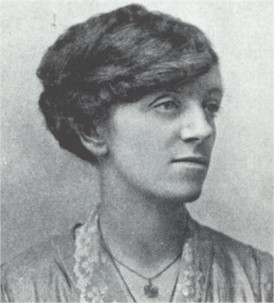
- Portrait of Carney, c. 1912
- Born: Maria Winifred Carney; 4 December 1887; Bangor, County Down, Ireland
- Died: 21 November 1943 (aged 55); Belfast, Northern Ireland
- Resting place: Milltown Cemetery
- Other name: Winnie Carney
- Education: Christian Brothers School, Donegall Street, Belfast
- Occupation: Trade unionist
- Employer(s): Irish Textile Workers' Union, Irish Transport and General Workers Union
- Known for: Political and labour activism, participation in the 1916 Rising
- Political party: Sinn Féin, Socialist Party of Ireland, Independent Labour Party, Northern Ireland Labour Party, Socialist Party of Northern Ireland
- Movement: Gaelic League, Irish Women's Suffrage Society, Women's Social and Political Union, Na Fianna Éireann, Cumann na mBan, Irish Citizen Army
- Spouse: George McBride (m. 1928)

Maria Winifred "Winnie" Carney (4 December 1887 – 21 November 1943), was an Irish republican, a participant in the 1916 Easter Rising in Dublin and, as a trade union secretary, women's suffragist, and socialist party member, a lifelong social and political activist in Belfast. In March 2024, a statue to her was unveiled on the grounds of Belfast City Hall.

== Early life ==
Born into a lower-middle class Catholic family at Fisher's Hill in Bangor, County Down, Carney was the daughter of commercial traveller Alfred Carney and Sarah Cassidy who had married in Belfast on 25 February 1873. She had six siblings.

Winifred and her family moved to Falls Road in Belfast when she was a child, where her mother ran a small sweet shop. Her father, a Protestant, later left the family, leaving her mother to support them. Two brothers left for America, and two sisters for the convent. Carney, educated at the Christian Brothers School in Donegall Street in the city, taught at the school before qualifying, around 1911, as a secretary and shorthand typist, one of the first women in Belfast to do so.

Carney took an early interest in the work of the Gaelic League (Conradh na Gaeilge) and of the Irish Women's Suffrage Society,

== Trade unionist ==
In 1912, she resigned a position with a solicitor in Dungannon, to succeed her friend, Marie Johnson, in the poor and irregularly paid position of secretary to the Irish Textile Workers' Union.The union, a rival to Mary Galway's more cautious Textile Operatives Society, was officially a branch of the Irish Women Workers' Union led in Dublin by Delia Larkin. In practice it functioned, in Belfast, as the women's section of James Larkin's Irish Transport and General Workers Union. The ITGWU branch secretary in Belfast was the republican socialist James Connolly.

Belfast mill workers early 1900s

In June 1913, while claiming that "the ranks of the Irish Textile Workers’ Union are being recruited by hundreds", with Carney, Connolly produced a Manifesto to the Linen Slaves of Belfast (1913) that revealed his frustration as an organiser:

[M]any Belfast mills are slaughterhouses for the women and penitentiaries for the children. But while all the world is deploring your conditions, they also unite in deploring your slavish and servile nature in submitting to them; they unite in wondering of what material these Belfast women are made, who refuse to unite together and fight to better their conditions.

It did not always "hinder women from fighting together when circumstances demanded it" (they had struck en masse in 1874, in 1906,and again in 1911 during which the ITWU had been formed), but the rate of organization among the female textile workers in Belfast remained low. The ITWU's predominantly Catholic membership may not have greatly exceeded the 300 subscribed under Johnson. To Carney, Connolly conceded that its survival was largely a matter of "keeping the Falls Road crowd together".

During the great Dublin lock-out in the autumn of 1913, with her trade union comrades Ellen [Gordon] Grimley and Cathal O'Shannon, Carney raised funds and organised support for the workers and (in a "holiday" scheme devised by Dora Montefiore) for their children sheltered by sympathetic families in Belfast. The press counted her among the "Don't Give a Damn League", a reference to Grimley's assertion that she did not "care a damn" if at their rallies and meetings police were present.

== Suffragist ==
The Belfast-based Irish Women's Suffrage Society was not an affiliate of the Dublin-based Irish Women's Franchise League, which campaigned unsuccessfully to have votes for women included in the 1912 Home Rule Bill. In as much as they argued that a Dublin parliament would block further advances for women, in the IWSS Carney was joining with women who were unionist. Among them were Elizabeth McCracken (the writer "L.A.M. Priestley") and Elizabeth Bell (the first woman in Ireland to qualify as a gynaecologist), and Margaret McCoubrey (whom Carney was later to encounter in the Northern Ireland Labour Party). While largely middle-class women, they spoke at street corners and held dinner hour meetings at factory and mill gates in Belfast to get working class women involved.

In April 1914, the IWSS dissolved. With the other activists, Carney had transferred her loyalty to the Belfast branch of the direct-action Women's Social and Political Union being organised by Christabel Pankhurst's emissary from England, Dorothy Evans. The WSPU believed they had had an understanding with the Ulster Unionist Council based on its inclusion of votes for women in draft articles of the Provisional Government (readied for Ulster should a Dublin parliament be restored). With regard to an Irish parliament, the nationalists would make no such undertaking. But in March 1914, after being doorstepped for four days in London, Edward Carson ruled that Unionists could not take a position on so divisive an issue as women's suffrage, and the WSPU declared an end to "the truce we have held in Ulster".

A result was that Carney joined the WSPU just as its militants launched a campaign of arson attacks against Unionist-associated properties. These included the Ulster Volunteers' centre at Abbeylands House, and culminated in Dorothy Evans creating an uproar in court by demanding to know why James Craig, who was then equipping the Volunteers with German arms, was not appearing on the same weapons and explosives charges.

Carney was not directly involved: Like other suffragists of Catholic background, she would have understood that while "to English eyes, it might have appeared that attacking the property of the Ulster Unionists was no different from attacking government buildings", in the "tense atmosphere of Belfast, which had witnessed many outbreaks of sectarian violence over the years, such actions [of which the Dublin-based Irish Women's Franchise League disapproved] could have very different connotations". But it is certain that, following Britain's declaration of war on Germany in August 1914, she would have supported Margaret McCoubrey and Elizabeth McCracken, in refusing Christabel Pankhurst's directive to disband and cease all activity for the duration.

In 1915, McCracken invited Christabel's renegade sister, Sylvia Pankhurst, to Belfast to speak in support equal pay for women doing war work. Carney may have met her on that occasion: correspondence with Sylvia Pankhurst was among the papers seized when police raided Carney's home in July 1922.

== Rebel insurgent ==
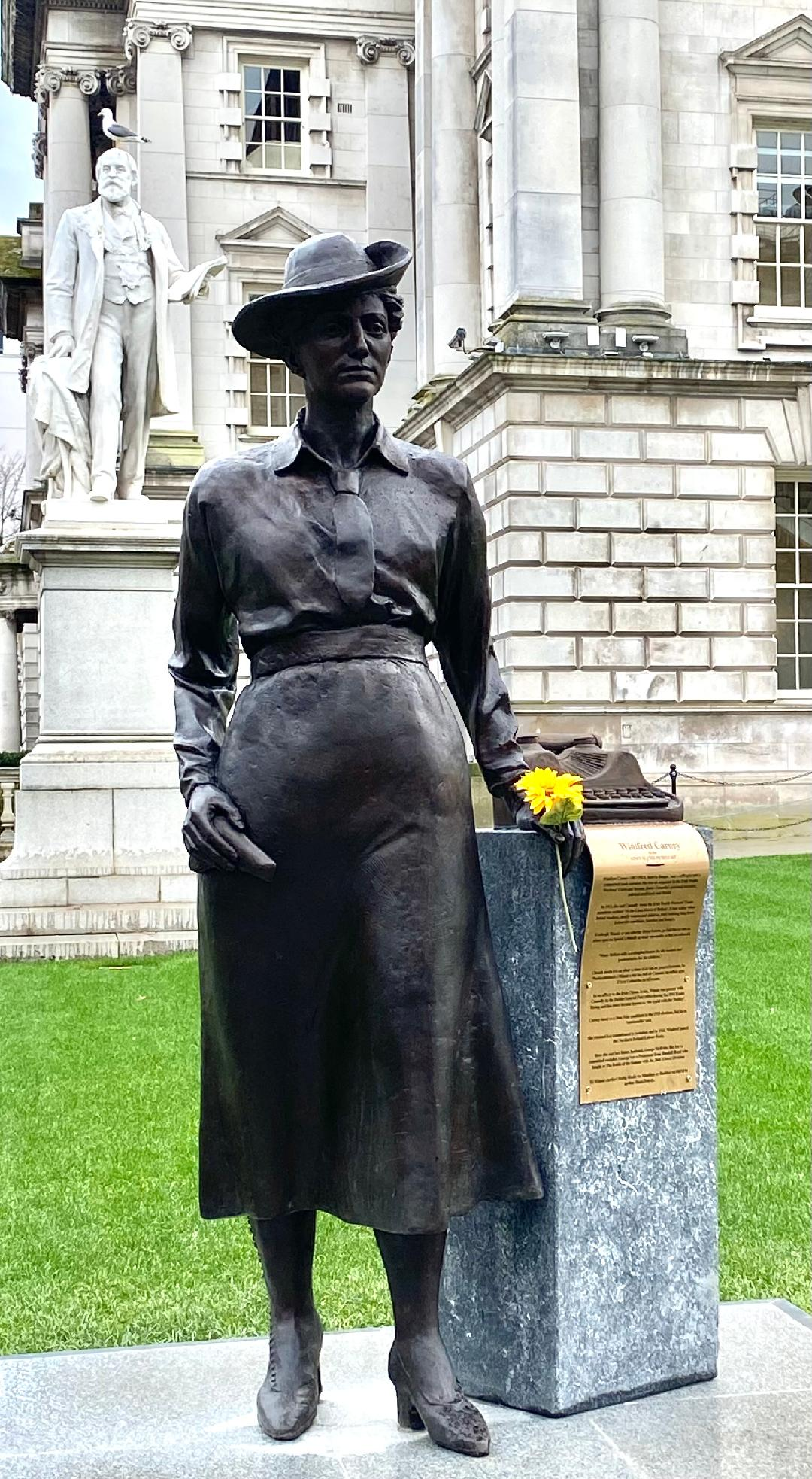
Winifred Carney (1916, Adjutant, Irish Citizen Army) Belfast City Hall, 2024.

Carney was Connolly's personal, as well as union-branch, secretary. She typed most his articles for the labour press. In the first months of 1916, these included editorials for The Workers' Republic that built towards a call to arms. They affirmed his conviction that the nation's was labour's cause, decried what he saw as the Home-Rulers "prostitution" of Ireland in Britain's war with Germany, and proposed that only the "red tide of war on Irish soil" would enable the nation to "recover its self-respect". In Constance Markievicz's nationalist youth, Na Fianna Éireann ("Soldiers of Ireland"), and then from April 1914 in the women's auxiliary of the Irish Volunteers, Cumann na mBan, Carney (alongside Connolly's daughters Nora and Ina) had received a degree of military training.

On 14 April 1916, Connolly summoned Carney to Dublin where she prepared his mobilisation orders for the Irish Citizen Army (ICA). Having set out with the initial garrison party from Liberty Hall on Easter Monday, Carney (armed with a typewriter and a Webley revolver) was the first woman during the Rising to enter the General Post Office. She recalled:

When we have settled in to our occupation and the Tricolour floats from the Post Office standard Connolly takes me out to the centre of O’Connell Street to see the Flag of the Republic wave on high and we shake hands. Meantime the Proclamation is read by [Patrick] Pearse in front of the G.P.O.

During that week (24-29 April) she served as Connolly's aide de camp with the rank of adjutant (the ICA had the distinction of giving women "rank and duty just as if they were men"). After Connolly was wounded, she refused to leave his side. In the morning of the last day, Friday 29 April, she took his dictation for an address read to the assembled GPO rebels: "Courage boys, we are winning, and in the hour of our victory let us not forget the splendid women who have everywhere stood by us and cheered us on. Never had a man or a woman a grander cause, never was a cause more grandly served". Of 30 women who to that point had remained, with its upper floors burning, in the GPO, with Julia Grenan and Elizabeth O'Farrell, Carney was to be the last to evacuate. With the final group of fighters, they bore Connolly on a stretcher to Moore Street, from where O'Farrell carried Pearse's request for terms to the British commander, Brigadier-General Lowe.

Interned, Carney was transferred in the summer to Aylesbury Prison in England. There, held on remand with Nell Ryan and Helena Molony, she was denied permission to join Markievicz (who had been the ICA second-in-command at the Royal College of Surgeons) in the convicted prison population. Carney and Molony were released two days before Christmas 1916. Markievicz was amnestied in the new year.

== Left-wing republican ==
Winifred Carney c. 1920

Supported by her friends Marie Johnson and Alice Milligan, in the December 1918 United Kingdom general election Carney stood for Sinn Féin in Belfast Victoria. With Markievicz in Dublin, she was one of only two women nominated by the republican party. Her manifesto, secretly written by a self-styled "Irish Bolshevik", Cathal O'Shannon, was headed by Connolly's strapline from The Workers' Republic: "The great only appear great because we are on our knees. LET US RISE!." It declared her resolve to fight conscription (although with the just-concluded German armistice, the danger of this was passing) and partition "with the same weapons, and same spirit and determination with which I fought, and am ready to fight again, for the Republic" Contending with labour rivals in a largely Protestant constituency, and derided by the Irish News as the candidate of "Sinn Féin feminists", Carney polled just 395 votes. The candidate for the Belfast Labour Party (BLP) (the majority of whom favoured, as the alternative to partition, all-Ireland home rule) took 3,469; the victorious Labour Unionist 9,309.

Carney continued to work for the ITGWU while retaining the confidence of the Irish Republican Army leadership in the north. She was secretary of the Irish Republican Prisoners’ Dependents Fund 1920-22, and in her home at 2A Carlisle Circus sheltered republicans such as Markievicz and Austin Stack In July 1922, her house was raided by the police. Among the "seditious papers" seized was correspondence with Michael Collins and other leading republicans, a membership card for the Socialist Party of Ireland, and a collection of political pamphlets. These included The Significance of Sinn Féin, Jack White's argument that the republic would not be achieved without a socialist appeal to labour; The Bolshevik Revolution, its Rise and Meaning (1919) by Maxim Litvinov, the future Soviet foreign minister who until the Russian Revolution had been in Belfast exile; and The Dictatorship of the Proletariat (1918) in which the German Marxist, Karl Kautsky, takes issue with Communist party dictatorship.

She was held for 18 days. Released on health grounds, she was later convicted and fined £2 for possession of documents “relating to the Third Northern Division of the IRA” (these, she had insisted, related only to her work for the relief of internees).

On the 1921 Anglo-Irish Treaty, Carney gave Michael Collins the benefit of the doubt. She became a courier carrying messages relating to his discussions with Sir James Craig, now Prime Minister of Northern Ireland, and then a member of a monitoring committee set up under the pact that was eventually reached. As the Civil War in the south unfolded, she recoiled from the summary execution of Collin's anti-Treaty former comrades, among them Erskine Childers, whom she had known well. But she was unpersuaded by Collins's nemesis, Éamon de Valera.

To O'Shannon, Carney remarked that it was well that Markievicz died when she did (in 1927) before, victorious in the Free State election of 1932, De Valera could employ her as a figurehead. Carney saw his Fianna Fáil regime as neither advancing the equality of women promised in the 1916 Proclamation nor the Democratic Programme of the First Dáil that had subordinated private property to "public right and public welfare" (and had included state provision for children and the elderly). Relenting only as she lay dying in her last weeks, Carney refused to accept from Dublin a pension for her part in 1916.

In 1920, Carney had attended an Independent Labour Party convention in Glasgow and, in 1924 accompanied other ILP members in joining the militant Court branch of the BLP's successor, the Northern Ireland Labour Party. The party acknowledged the reality of partition and of a Belfast parliament but without any profession of loyalty. It was an equivocation on the national question—a "pragmatic silence"— that allowed for an uneasy co-operation between republican labour and those who, despite its refusal to organise in Northern Ireland, looked to the Labour Party in Britain. The branch secretary was Tommy Geehen, a Catholic textile worker, who was to quit the NILP in 1930 for the Comintern-sanctioned Revolutionary Workers' Groups.

== Marriage to George McBride ==
In the NILP, Carney met George McBride. A working-class Protestant, ten years her junior, from the Shankill Road, McBride was a former Ulster Volunteer, and war veteran While she had been at the GPO, as a Lewis gunner with the 36th (Ulster) Division he had been moving up toward the trenches on the Somme. From the experience of the battlefield and of German captivity he had emerged as an internationalist and as an atheist. McBride shared Carney's socialist commitment, but not her continued defence of the Easter Rising (she could "never convince him that the deaths had been worth it") or her focus on partition (as they would anyway be controlled by international finance, the border, in his view, was not the central question). Facing opposition from both their families, in 1928, they took the ferry to Holyhead in Wales and married, in a civil registry, with no relatives present.

After her marriage, Carney left her job with the ITGWU. She was unwilling to work in Dublin, her health was poor, and she was caring for her increasingly infirm mother. Anticipating the reaction of his workmates to his marrying a republican, McBride had resigned his job at the Mackie engineering works; opened a small leather-good business, and taken a position as a National Council of Labour Colleges lecturer in Economic History. The couple got their own house at 3 Whitewell Parade, Newtownabbey, on Belfast's northern outskirts.

== Later activism with McBride ==
Belfast Socialists walking behind "Break the Connection with Capitalism" banner, Bodenstown, 1934.

In 1932, Carney and McBride were part of the Outdoor Relief Workers Committee. Its organising efforts contributed to bringing thousands of Protestant and Catholic working people out onto the streets, and after 10 days running street battles with the police, to winning significant increases in welfare payments. The following year, the couple joined the Socialist Party of Northern Ireland (SPNI), formed by those in the Independent Labour Party who refused a British national directive to disaffiliate from the NILP. A mainly Protestant organisation, with around 150 members in the Shankill and Newtownards Road districts of Belfast, it included Jack Macgougan, secretary from 1935 onwards, and Victor Halley.

In June 1934, with other party members (and with Jack White) they turned up in a contingent of 200 from Belfast at the annual Wolfe Tone commemoration at Bodenstown. They had been assembled by Victor Halley acting as an organiser for the Republican Congress, a popular front initiative of, among others, Anti-Treaty veterans Peadar O'Donnell, Frank Ryan, and George Gilmore. On the approach to Tone's graveside, the visitors were blocked by members of Tipperary IRA who seized and ripped their "red" ("Break The Connection with Capitalism") banner. The banner was carried later that day to the graveside of James Connolly at Arbour Hill in Dublin. The 36 members of the Shankill Road James Connolly Republican Club attending described themselves as "the vanguard of Protestant workers entering into active participation in the fight for an Irish Workers' Republic".

The Congress was unable to achieve left-republican unity. In September, Carney and McBride were delegates to a conference in Rathmines, where, despite denunciations of de Valera's system of labour "arbitration and conciliation" as "practical fascism", the Communist Party line of accommodating Fianna Fáil in an anti-imperialist "united front" was carried by a narrow majority.

From the summer of 1936, Carney and McBride worked with other socialists to organise support for the republican side in the Spanish Civil War. Again, they found themselves at odds with faith-and-fatherland nationalists. Contesting the Dock constituency in 1938, NILP leader Harry Midgley had his election rallies disrupted by chants of "Remember Spain" and "We want Franco."

== Death and commemoration ==

Carney's health deteriorated sharply in the late 1930s. On 21 November 1943, she died in Belfast of TB, aged 55. After a small funeral at her local parish Church (St Mary's Greencastle), Carney was buried at Milltown Cemetery in an unmarked grave. A grand-niece has suggested that this was due to her brother Ernest’s continued disapproval of her marriage to McBride.

In 1956, Connolly's biographer, the Marxist historian Desmond Greaves, found McBride "a big lumbering man in his late sixties with 5000 books littered throughout a quite small house" and committed to the memory not only of his wife, but also of Larkin and (though he had considered him a poor strategist) of Connolly. He spent his last decade in what had been the house of Sir James Craig, an Ulster Volunteer rest home in east Belfast. There, in March 1988, McBride witnessed on television the loyalist terrorist Michael Stone run over his wife's grave during his gun and grenade attack on an IRA funeral. He died a month later. Denied access by his brother-in-law to his wife's plot at Milltown, he was buried in an unmarked grave in Clandeboye Cemetery in Bangor.

Three years before, National Graves Association, Belfast had erected a headstone for Carney which had acknowledged her not only as a "life long republican socialist" but also as McBride's "beloved wife." In 2016 the Belfast and District Trades Union Council did McBride the same favour, erecting a grave marker with representatives from both families attending. A display, telling the story of Carney and McBride, was mounted at Belfast City Hall.

Following a 2012 Equality Impact Assessment that confirmed the grounds of Belfast City Hall were dominated by "white, male, upper class and unionist images," in 2017 Sinn Féin councilors proposed a monument to Carney. A concession to unionist sensibilities that would have incorporated a representation of her husband was rejected (McBride appears with Carney in stained glass windows at the Duncairn Arts Centre in north Belfast). Together with another bronze by the same artist, Ralph Sander, of the United Irishwoman and abolitionist Mary Ann McCracken, the figure of Carney was unveiled in front of the city hall on International Women's Day (8 March) 2024. Carney is depicted—typewriter on one side, Webley revolver on the other—in her 1916 Citizen Army uniform.

Played by Eithne Lydon, Winifred Carney appears in the 1966 RTÉ drama series on the 1916 Rising, Insurrection. She is a chief protagonist in a 2015 graphic novel, designed with a learning pack on the Easter Rising for secondary schools in Northern Ireland.

== Biographies ==
- Allison Murphy, Winnie & George: An Unlikely Union, Mercier Press, ISBN 978-1-78117-470-8, 2017
- Diane Urquart, Women in Ulster politics, 1890–1940, Irish Academic Press, ISBN 978-0-7165-2627-8, 2000.
- Margaret Ward, Unmanageable revolutionaries, Pluto Press, ISBN 978-0-7453-1084-8, 1995
- Helga Woggon, Silent radical, Winifred Carney 1887–1943: a reconstruction of her autobiography, SIPTU, Irish Labour History Society, 2000.
