= Margaret McCoubrey =

- Born: Margaret Mearns; 5 January 1880; Elderslie, Scotland
- Died: 11 April 1956 (aged 76); Belfast, Northern Ireland
- Occupation: Suffragist

Margaret McCoubrey (5 January 1880 – 11 April 1956) was a Belfast-based Irish suffragist, pacifist, and an activist in the cooperative and labour movements. Standing for the Belfast Labour Party, she was elected to Belfast City Council in 1920.

== Life ==
McCoubrey nee Mearns was born on 5 January 1880 in Elderslie, near Glasgow in Scotland.

McCoubrey married an Irish trade unionist and moved to Belfast. There, in 1910 she joined the Irish Women's Suffrage Society (established in the city by Isabella Tod in 1872), and was an active militant alongside Elizabeth McCracken (the writer "L.A.M. Priestley") and Elizabeth Bell (the first woman in Ireland to qualify as a doctor and gynaecologist). When in 1913, Dorothy Evans started organizing the Women's Social and Political Union (WPSU), she followed them in joining the British organization, and travelled to London as a representative of women in the north of Ireland. The theme of self-sacrifice was paramount amongst suffragettes and Margaret McCoubrey claimed that suffragettes were continuing an Irish tradition of violent protest.

At the outbreak of the First World War, she and McCracken disagreed with the WSPU's orders to cease agitation, and instead founded a branch of the Irish Women's Franchise League in Belfast. But her efforts were bedevilled by sectarian-political differences and, with "dreams of united womanhood", were abandoned in the spring of 1915.

McCoubrey joined the peace movement and gave refuge to conscientious objectors. At that time, the majority of women in Ulster perceived pacifism as unpatriotic and female suffrage as unimportant in comparison with the dangers threatening wartime Europe. As a result, only a few suffragists remained active during the War. McCoubrey single-handedly ran a month-long peace and suffrage campaign in Belfast in August 1917, inspired by her belief that 'a woman looking down on a battlefield would not see dead Germans or dead Englishmen but so many mother's sons'.

She became general secretary of the Co-operative Women's Guild and in 1922, she was elected to represent the Irish guildswomen on the newly formed International Women's Co-operative Committee, which came into existence at Basel.

She was an active member of the Independent Labour Party, and when it emerged out of a conference of the ILP and trade unionists, of the Belfast Labour Party. In 1920, she was elected as BLP councillor for the Dock ward of Belfast.

In 1924, the BLP became in turn the Northern Ireland Labour Party (NILP) which desisted from taking any decided position on the "national" or "constitutional question"—i..e. on whether Northern Ireland, as constituted in 1920, should remain part of the United Kingdom or join with the Irish Free State. McCoubrey associated with a largely Protestant section of the party identified with its leading Belfast personalities, Harry Midgley and Jack Beattie, content to work within the new Northern Ireland framework and, with the British Labour Party, was reformist in outlook. In a 1926 article in Labour Opposition, McCoubrey expressed the hope that the labour movement would bring about a "peaceful revolution" and distanced herself from those who considered "Marxian theory" more important than the provision of Pure Milk.

McCoubrey died on 11 April 1956 in Belfast, Northern Ireland.
