= Ballymacdermott Court Tomb =

Megalithic monument in Northern Ireland

Ballymacdermot Court Tomb
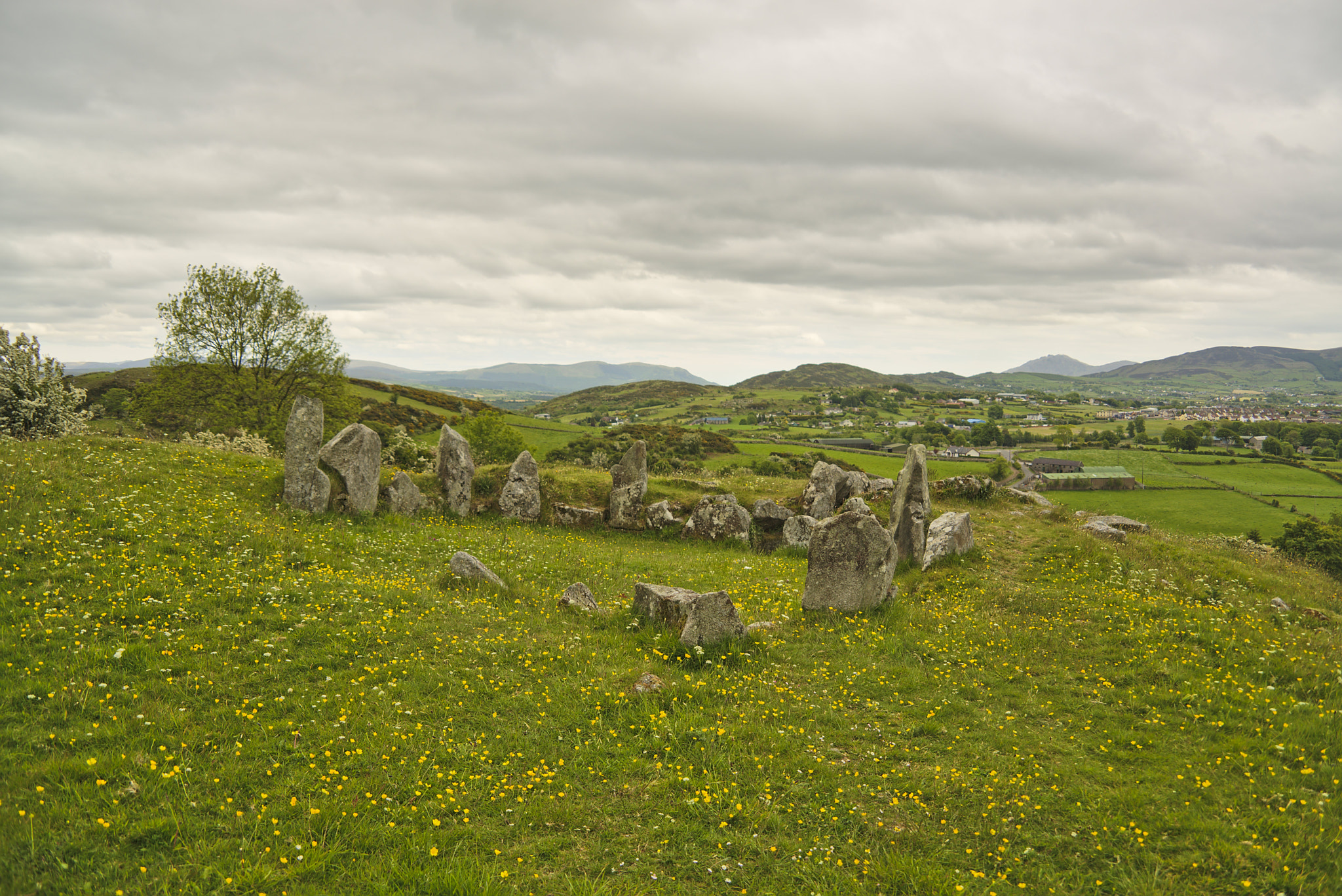
- The tomb in 2015
- Type: Tomb
- Location: Northern Ireland, United Kingdom

History
- Built: c. 3250 BC

Site notes
- Material: Stone

The Ballymacdermot Court Tomb is a megalithic portal tomb 600 feet up the southern slope of Ballymacdermot Mountain in County Armagh, two miles outside Newry. Ballymacdermott is situated with views of the Mourne Mountains to the east and Slieve Gullion to the west. The site is a scheduled monument in State care.

The site dates from between 4000 and 2500 BCE and is located close to other neolithic monuments such as Ballykeel Dolmen and Clontigora Cairn.

== Excavations ==
The tomb was excavated in 1816 by John Bell of the nearby Killeavy Castle, in conjunction with the landowner, Jonathon Seavers. They reported to the Newry Magazine that they had found an urn containing pulverized bone fragments.

It was again excavated in 1962 by A. E. P. Collins and B. Wilson who discovered evidence of human cremations, flint, and ceramics. The archaeologists also discovered that some of the stones had been significantly disturbed in recent years. Local people told the survey team that this was as a result of an encounter with a U.S. Army tank during the Second World War.
