= Independent Women's Social and Political Union =

The Independent Women's Social and Political Union (IWSPU, often known as the Independent WSPU) was a women's suffrage organisation active in the United Kingdom during World War I.

The Women's Social and Political Union (WSPU) was the most prominent militant suffrage organisation in the United Kingdom until the start of World War I. However, on the outbreak of war, the WSPU leader Christabel Pankhurst decided to suspend suffrage campaigning, and instead focus on support for the war. Many members of the organisation disagreed with the decision, with some forming the breakaway Suffragettes of the Women's Social and Political Union in 1915.

A further breakaway took place in March 1916, led by Charlotte Marsh, a former organiser for the WSPU. She founded the "Independent Women's Social and Political Union", and launched a journal, the Independent Suffragette. Other leading members included Edith Rigby, who founded a branch in Preston, Lancashire, and Dorothy Evans, who served as its provincial organiser.

The group was very hostile to Christabel and Emmeline Pankhurst, but while it did not share the WSPU's patriotism, it did not oppose the war. The group proclaimed that it would devote itself to the suffrage campaign and would "work in the spirit of the old WSPU". It stopped publishing its journal in 1917, and appears to have dissolved before the end of 1918.
