= Ballykeel Dolmen =

Neolithic tripod portal tomb, Northern Ireland

Coordinates: 54.136696°N 6.471204°W

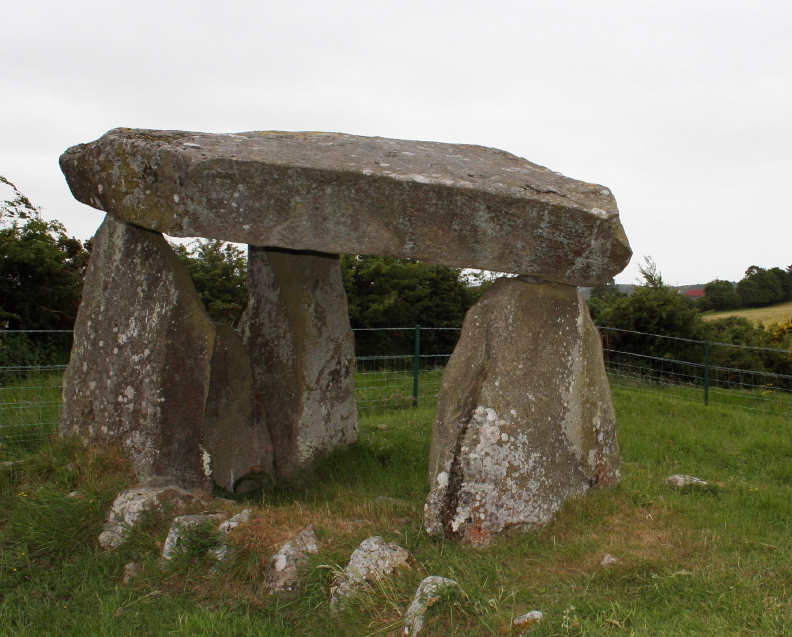
Ballykeel Dolmen, June 2006

Ballykeel Dolmen is a Neolithic tripod portal tomb and a State Care Historic Monument at the foot of the western flank of Slieve Gullion in Northern Ireland. It is located above a tributary of the Forkhill river, in the Newry, Mourne and Down District Council area, at grid ref: H9950 2132.

The dolmen sits at the southern end of a large cairn, of approximately 30x10 metres, the north end of which also contains a cist. Its three metre long capstone, with a notable notch similar to that of Legananny Dolmen, had previously fallen, but was re-set during excavations in 1963. The granite capstone is balanced on the tips of the three portal stones.

Excavations of the chamber revealed different types of pottery, including three highly decorated "Ballyalton" bowls, and the cist contained several hundred sherds of Neolithic pottery, a javelin head, and three flint flakes. High levels of phosphates found in the chambers floor is an indication of ancient burials. Nearby is Ballymacdermott Court Tomb.

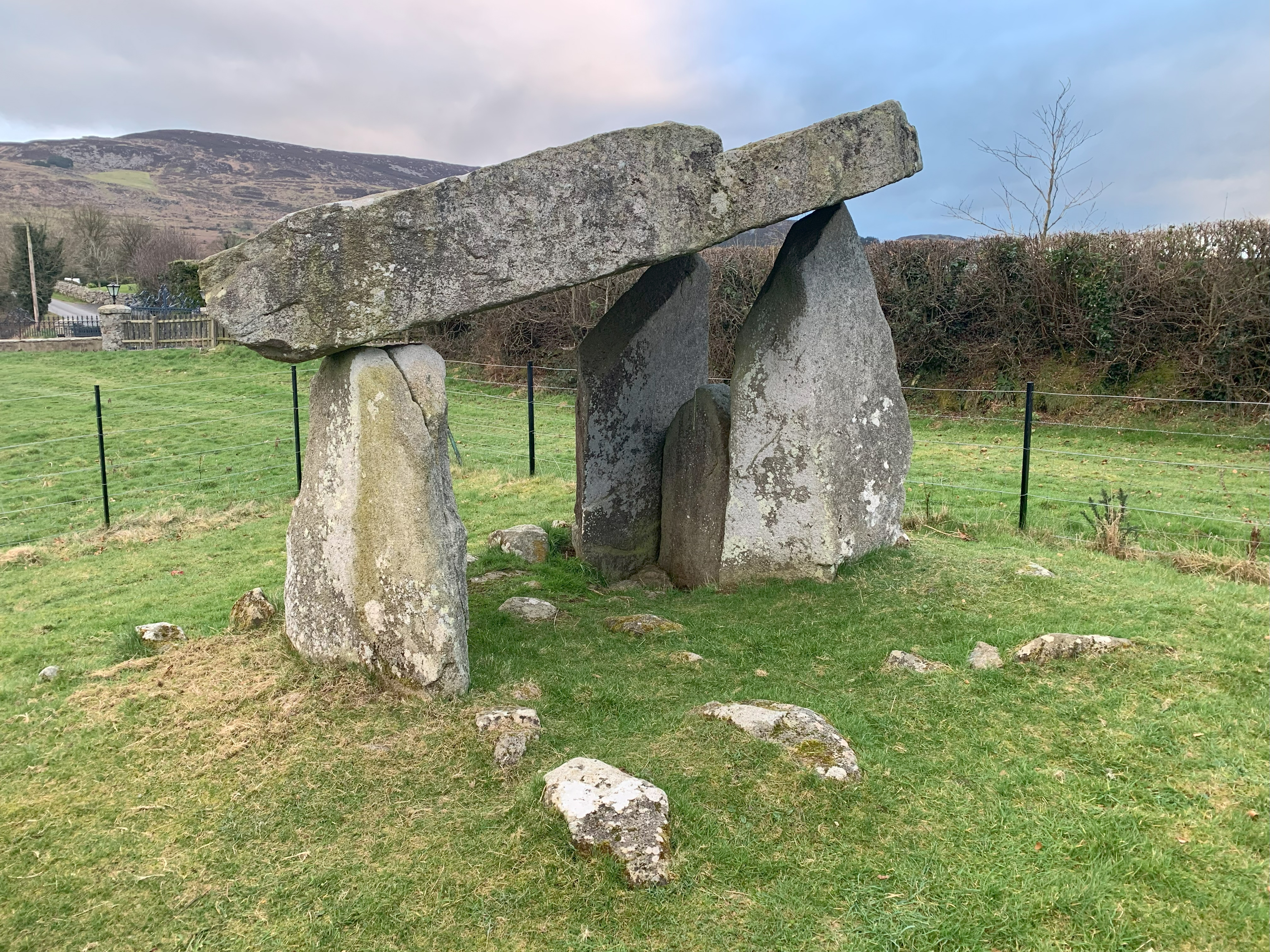
County Armagh - Ballykeel Dolmen and Cairn 20230301 from west
