= Ellen Grimley =

- Born: Ellen Jane Whelan; 7 April 1884; Belfast, Ireland
- Died: 27 October 1960 (aged 72–73); Glengarriff Parade, Dublin
- Occupation: trade union organiser

Ellen "Nellie" Grimley also known as Nellie Gordon (7 April 1884 – 27 October 1960) was an Irish trade unionist.

== Early life ==
Ellen Grimley was born Ellen Jane Whelan in Belfast on 7 April 1884. She was the only daughter of John Whelan, a tradesman and the former Mary McGorrian. Grimley, by her own account, grew up in a comfortable home but was aware of the severe poverty and deprivation around her. At age 11, she began her career as a mill worker part time while continuing to attend school three days a week. Later she became a doffing mistress, overseeing the spinning frames at Owen O’Cork's mill, Belfast.

== Union career ==
She was involved in the trade union movement from 1912, becoming a member of the Belfast branch of the Irish Women Workers' Union (IWWU). It was through the union that she met James Connolly, who was impressed by her manner, and offered her a full time position as a union organiser at the offices of the Irish Textile Workers' Union (ITWU) in York Street. Her elder brother encouraged her to take the position, which she accepted. Initially she received no wage, but soon developed a reputation for addressing large public meetings as an animated speaker, who proved very popular with factory girls.

Connolly and other union members encouraged her to read more broadly, leading to Grimley becoming more active in politics. In 1913 she attended the Irish Trade Union Congress in Cork as an IWWU delegate. There she addressed a labour party meeting in Cobh, and the ITGWU platform in Blackpool, Cork. En route back to Belfast, she addressed a very well attended meeting at Liberty Hall in Dublin. She spoke on the same platform as Keir Hardie at the Belfast Co-operative Hall, most likely in 1913. She campaigned for the Dublin workers suffering during the lockout in the same year, fundraising for them in Belfast. Along with her close friends, Winifred Carney, Cathal O'Shannon and James Grimley, they became known as the "Don't Give a Damn League", referencing Grimley's often repeated quote that she did not "care a damn" if a policeman was present. She signed a 1913 manifesto, To the Linen Slaves of Belfast, with Carney and Connolly, which described the Belfast mills as "slaughterhouses for the women and penitentiaries for the children." From 1915, she worked as a sick visitor in the national health insurance scheme.

== Family and later life ==
She married Joseph Gordon, a Belfast carter, in October 1906. She was later widowed in December 1913 when her husband died from tuberculosis aged 28. She was remarried to James Grimley in September 1915. Her husband was a postman who was active in the Socialist Party of Ireland, and then the Belfast labour party from 1918. After the birth of their first child in the summer of 1916, Grimley had less time for the union movement, and while she was a member of Cumann na mBan, she did not take an active role in the War of Independence. She ran a secondhand furniture shop near Newtonards Road, but the family were forced to move to Dublin in 1935 following the outbreak of sectarian violence in Belfast. She and husband were friends with Ina Connolly, James Connolly's daughter. Grimley wrote an account of her work with James Connolly in 1953. The book, Ellen Grimley (Nellie Gordon) - Reminiscences of her Work with James Connolly in Belfast', was edited for publication by Helga Woggon in 2000. Grimely died on 27 October 1960 at her home on Glengarriff Parade, Dublin.
