= Dorothy Evans =

British feminist activist and suffragette

- Born: 6 May 1888; London, United Kingdom of Great Britain and Ireland
- Died: 28 August 1944 (aged 56); Glasgow, Scotland
- Education: North London Collegiate School; Dartford College
- Occupation: Suffragette

Dorothy Elizabeth Evans (6 May 1888 – 28 August 1944) was a British feminist activist and suffragette. On the eve of World War I she was a militant organiser for the Women's Social and Political Union twice arrested in Belfast on explosives charges. She broke with Christabel Pankhurst and the WSPU in 1914 over their support for the war, and remained until the end of her life an active peace and women's equality campaigner.

== Early WSPU Engagement ==
Born in the Kentish Town area of London, Evans studied at the North London Collegiate School and the Dartford College of Physical Education, qualifying as a teacher. She joined the Women's Social and Political Union (WSPU) in 1907 and, after resigning a teaching position, from early 1910 worked full-time as the Union's Birmingham organiser. During this period, she was frequently arrested and imprisoned for acts linked to the suffragette campaign, including refusing to buy a dog license. She also organised parties to be held in Birmingham on the night when the 1911 census was being enumerated, so that she and also suffragettes could participate in the boycott of the census.

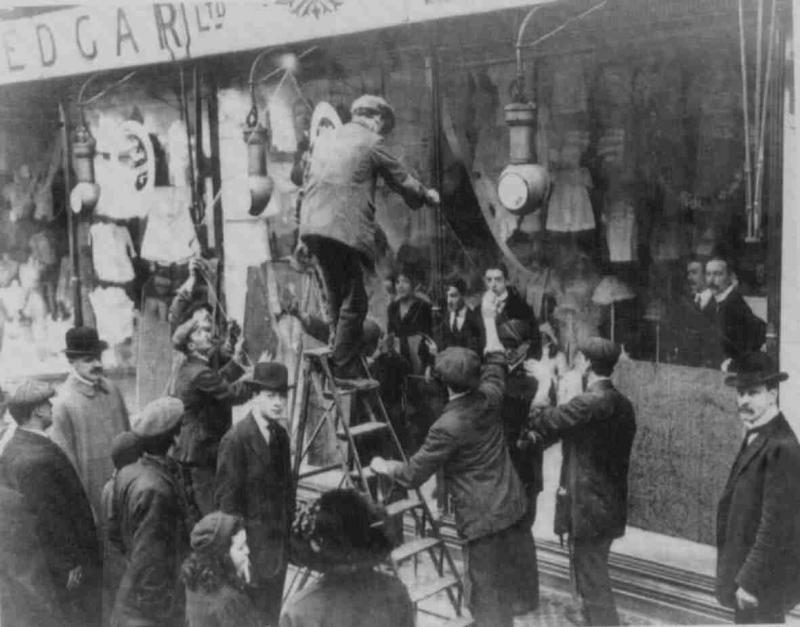
suffragette window smashing campaign

Convicted for her part in a window-smashing campaign in the West End of London, between March and July 1912 Evans was held in the Feeble-Minded Inebriate bloc of Aylesbury Prison. She protested in two hunger strikes and endured forced feeding. After her release she served as WSPU liaison between its London headquarters and its leader, Christabel Pankhurst, in Parisian exile. Evans travelled in disguise to avoid detection, but learned she had avoided arrest only because an innocent Dorothy Evans had been detained.

== Direct action in Ulster ==
In the spring of 1913 Evans was posted to the north of Ireland, Ulster, where Pankhurst had decided it was the Ulster Unionists, not the Irish nationalists, who were to be courted. The Irish Party had ignored her warning that if they helped defeat the 1912 Conciliation bill (which would have extended the vote to women albeit on a highly restrictive property basis), they would be in "a fight to the death" with the suffragists: "No votes for women, no Home Rule".

Evans quickly attracted, from the long-established Irish Women's Suffrage Society, Elizabeth McCracken (the writer "L.A.M. Priestley"), Dr Elizabeth Bell (Ireland's first qualified woman gynaecologist), both of whom were unionist, and Winifred Carney (James Connolly's secretary in the Belfast branch of the Irish Transport and General Workers' Union). By April 1914, Evans had won over so many from the IWSS that it formally disbanded.

When in the spring of 1914, the Unionist leader Edward Carson pressed by Evans (she led a forty-hour siege of his doorstep in London), overruled Craig (who had supported the Conciliation Bill) on a Unionist commitment to women's suffrage, Evans declared an end to "the truce we have held in Ulster." At a meeting held in Belfast's Ulster Hall on 13 March 1914, she proposed that:

Carson was no friend of women unless he was prepared to stand and champion their rights as strongly as he championed the rights of men ... he was their enemy, and he would be fought as any other politician ... who had the power and did not use it to get their rights ... they ... declared war on ... Carson ... The civil war that was absolutely certain was the one between the women and the powers that be.

In the months that followed WSPU militants, including Bell, were implicated in a series of arson attacks on unionist-owned or associated property: golf, tennis, and bowling-green club houses, but including Abbeylands House where the Ulster Volunteers' were drilled. On 3 April 1914 police raided the flat in Belfast Evans was sharing with activist Madge Muir, and found explosives. In court, five days later, the pair created uproar when they demanded to know why the Ulster Unionist James Craig who was arming the Volunteers with German guns was not appearing on the same charges.

Such was their disruptiveness, that the whole court was moved to a desk in the corridor outside Evans's open cell door. Remanded in custody, the women on hunger strike were released under the Cat and Mouse Act but then promptly re-arrested after they drove around Belfast city centre and passed the courthouse in an opened-top car festooned it with suffragette flags.

WPSU members of Catholic background such as Carney were not directly involved. They understood that while "to English eyes, it might have appeared that attacking the property of the Ulster Unionists was no different from attacking government buildings", in the "tense atmosphere of Belfast, which had witnessed many outbreaks of sectarian violence over the years, such actions could have very different connotations".

Convicted and committed to Tullamore prison, Evans went on hunger strike. She wrote to fellow militant Kate Evans, "I am getting some mental and spiritual peace, though my body is suffering – I find I am getting ill much sooner now I am not taking water either… The cells here are darker than any I have seen". Because of her deterioration Evans was released on 26 July. She was cared for by a sister WPSU Hunger Strike Medallist Lillian Metge. In May Metge had been part of the large group of women who charged at King George V outside Buckingham Palace, and during Evans's trail had herself been arrested for throwing stones at the court windows.

On 3 July 1914, in a plan hatched with Evans, Metge bombed the chancel of Lisburn Cathedral. Outrage over this and the proceeding militant actions peaked when government raised the local rates to pay for the damage caused.

== Pacifist and equality campaigner ==
Again in prison, Evans was released under the general amnesty offered to members of the WSPU at the outbreak of the war in August . She broke with Christabel and Emmeline Pankhurst by opposing the war and became an organiser for the Independent Women's Social and Political Union. In 1915, she was refused a passport to attend the Women's Peace Conference in the Hague.

Evans also became active with an earlier breakaway from the WSPU, the Women's Freedom League, in 1917 helping form a branch in Newcastle upon Tyne with Ada Broughton and Emily Davison. The League had Formed in 1907 in protest against both the Pankhursts' lack of democratic accountability and the militant actions that they (and Evans) had sanctioned. But League commitment to non-violence extended to opposition to the war and a commitment to the Women's Peace Council.

After the war Evans continued as an organiser for the WFL and from 1923 also organised for the Women's International League for Peace and Freedom. Later she became a leading member (for many years chairperson) of the Six Point Group which demanded legislative redress with regard to child abuse, widowed and unmarried mothers, equal parental rights, and equal pay and opportunity in schools and the civil service, and she joined the similarly programmed National Union of Societies for Equal Citizenship.

During World War II, she served as the secretary of the Women's International League. Her principal concern, however, continued to be employment equality. She was involved in the Equal Compensation Campaign from 1941 to 1943 and became a member of the Equal Pay Campaign Committee in 1944, to ensure equal pay in the Civil Service. She was also active in the Women for Westminster group campaigning to increase the number of women MPs, and the drafted the Equal Citizenship (Blanket) Bill of 1944.

== Personal life ==
Evans died after a two-day illness in Glasgow where she was to speak at a meeting. She was 55.

Evans had maintained simultaneous long-term relationships with Sybil Morrison and Emil Davies, a married Labour Party London County councillor. Evans refused wedlock, and according to her friend Monica Whately saved for three years in preparation for the baby fathered by Davies in 1921. At the time of her death in August 1944 her daughter Lyndal (named after the heroine in Olive Schreiner's Story of an African Farm) was a member of the executive committee of the Six Point Group. The historian, Brian Harrison, interviewed Lyndal in March 1975, as part of the Suffrage Interviews project, titled Oral evidence on the suffragette and suffragist movements: the Brian Harrison interviews. Sybil Morrison was also present at the interview. Lyndal talks about her mother's upbringing and character, how her parents met, her work and the damage done to her by force feeding.

== See also ==
- List of suffragists and suffragettes
- List of peace activists
- Women's Social and Political Union--'Hunger strikes, direct action'
- Unionism in Ireland--'Unionism and women's suffrage'
