= Irish Women's Suffrage Society =

The Irish Women's Suffrage Society was an organisation for women's suffrage, founded by Isabella Tod as the North of Ireland Women's Suffrage Society in 1872. Determined lobbying by the Society ensured the 1887 Act creating a new city-status municipal franchise for Belfast conferred the vote on persons rather than men. This was eleven years before women elsewhere Ireland gained the vote in local government elections.

It changed its name to the Irish Women's Suffrage Society in 1909. It was based in Belfast but had branches in other parts of the north of Ireland. Weekly meetings in Belfast discussed temperance, infant mortality, sex education, venereal disease, white slave trafficking, protective factory legislation for women and equal opportunities. During the height of the Home Rule crisis in 1912–1913 the WSS held at least 47 open-air meetings in Belfast, and mounted dinner-hour pickets at factory gates to engage working women.

Leading members included Margaret McCoubrey, Elizabeth McCracken (the writer "L.A.M. Priestley") and Elizabeth Bell (the first woman in Ireland to qualify as a gynaecologist). The society was also joined by Winifred Carney, a trade union secretary and close associate of James Connolly. When in 1913, Dorothy Evans, at the behest of Christabel Pankhurst, started organizing the Women's Social and Political Union (WPSU) in Belfast, these and other members joined the British organization, and were implicated in the direct action it launched early 1914 against Ulster Unionists to protest their failure to commit to women's suffrage.

By April 1914, Evans had won over so many from the IWSS that the society formally disbanded.

A suffrage society, with a greater commitment to direct action, had been set up in Lisburn by Lillian Metge who also cooperated with Evans in the WSPU campaign.

== See also ==
- Women's suffrage organizations
- Timeline of women's suffrage
- List of suffragists and suffragettes
