= Women's suffrage activism in Leigh =

This is an overview of Women's Suffrage activism and local politics as experienced in Leigh, Lancashire between 1900 and 1914.

== 1900 to 1909 ==
In October 1900 Mrs A Urmston of the Leigh Co-operative Women's Guild, wrote to Leigh's MP, C. P. Scott asking him to vote favourably on Women's Suffrage Bills. He answered in the affirmative. In 1908 Henry Yorke Stanger, Leigh County Court Judge and MP for Kensington North, introduced a private member's Women's Suffrage Bill.

On 15 July 1909, Women's Social and Political Union activists, Annie Kenney, Jennie Baines, Mabel Capper, Charlotte Marsh and Florence Clarkson attempted to force their way into Leigh Co-operative Hall to disrupt the Liberal Party's guest speaker, Lewis Harcourt. After a violent struggle, Clarkson of Oxford Road, Manchester was arrested and bailed at £10. The next day when tried in Leigh Police Station's Day Room, she refused to pay the 20 shilling fine imposed and was sentenced to fourteen days in the second division at Strangeways Gaol in Manchester. There she went on hunger strike but did not serve her full sentence without food, denying herself food for 65 hours.

== National Union of Women’s Suffrage Societies ==
During the General Election of January 1910, members of the National Union of Women's Suffrage Societies (NUWSS) visited Leigh to collect signatures for their Voters’ Petition. They aimed to prove that male voters were in favour of votes for women. With the cooperation of local suffragists, 2,843 signatures were collected at Leigh polling stations. After which, a banner stating "2,843 Men of Leigh Demand Women’s Suffrage" was used to advertise suffrage meetings in the town. A similar banner, bearing the same legend was used in the "Prison to Citizenship Constitutional Demonstration" in London on 18 June 1910.

From September 1910 the North of England Society for Women's Suffrage began a consciousness raising campaign in Leigh. In October 1910 the Leigh branch of the NUWSS, the Leigh Women’s Suffrage Society, was formed. Its first secretary was Miss F.P. Hindshaw BA, followed by Miss L. Cook of 13 Railway Road. Membership of the Leigh branch was not gendered and non party. The campaign took the form of a series of public meetings and debates led by prominent pro-suffrage workers, supported by local interested parties and out of town speakers, including the Liberal Association President, and editor and proprietor of the Manchester Guardian, C.P. Scott. Other key speakers included Mrs F.T. Swanwick, suffragist and editor of the NUWSS paper the Common Cause: Kathleen Courtney, secretary of the North of England Society for Women’s Suffrage; Lisbeth Simms of the Women’s Labour League; Margaret Robertson BA Manchester Society/NUWSS organiser: and a Manchester councillor, Margaret Ashton, founder member of the Women’s Trade Union League and chairperson of the NUWSS. The women spoke on why women needed and deserved the vote whilst attempting to discredit opponents' arguments. They stressed their non militancy, non party and law abiding credentials to address a degree of fear by women of becoming identified with the "shrieking sisterhood" (WSPU). Locally there were immediate and legitimate reasons for unease and fear. When Margaret Robertson spoke at a National Union of Teachers Association meeting in Leigh, some male members in the audience "moodily twirled their moustaches and gazed at the floor" and the chairman "kept a few from that energy of opposition that often ends in blows". This latent aggression on occasion resulted in violence, and in one instance was condoned by the local press. When a socialist in Tyldesley was mobbed for hanging out a ‘Votes for Women’ banner, Leigh Chronicle opined "he asked for it" and "deserved what he got".

== Political associations ==
A proportion of the town's women had organised into political associations before the campaign. The Leigh Women’s Liberal Association was particularly large. Three hundred women were taken by train from Westleigh to Lowton, to be thanked for their part in MP Peter Raffan's 1910 Parliamentary election campaign. From 1910 to 1914 the women held tea meetings where between 100 and 200 attendees were addressed by speakers. Female Conservatives organised in either Women’s Unionist or Conservative Associations. These were large organisations, with sufficient kudos to attract the Rt Hon Austen Chamberlain MP. Though the Labour Party was in its infancy, it was formed in July 1908, it had an active women's section.

== Women’s Labour League ==
The Women's Labour League was a Labour Party pressure group, formed in 1906. It promoted and supported both male and female candidates for parliamentary or municipal office and Boards of Guardians. From 1911 WLL branches were established at Bamfurlong, Ashton in Makerfield, Golborne, Lowton, Leigh and Tyldesley. The Leigh Labour Party was ambitious. Tom Greenall was its first Parliamentary candidate for the General Election of January 1910 and it was increasing its membership of Leigh Council.

== Mrs G Mottram ==
The Lowton and Leigh WLL branches had a committed and able leader, Mrs G Mottram, who was a founder and secretary for the Lowton and Leigh branches. The branches were small, 20 in Lowton and 60 in Leigh, but they made an impact during Leigh’s municipal elections. Mrs Mottram stood, unsuccessfully, as a candidate for Leigh Rural District Council and the Leigh Guardians' elections in 1913. She attended WLL Conferences – at Earlestown she argued for equal pay for women and she was a member of the Leigh Insurance Committee. During WW1 she agitated for Municipal Lodging Houses for women munitions workers, was a member of the Leigh War Emergency Workers Committee. She was a member of Leigh’s Naval and Military War Pensions Committee and helped devise systems to aid Leigh's Disabled Soldiers and Sailors.

== Facilitating working class membership ==
Like Ellen Wilkinson, who became a Labour MP, cabinet minister, and leader of the Jarrow Marchers, working in Tyldesley, Mrs Mottram was both a WLL and NUWSS organiser. In 1910 the NUWSS launched its Friends of Women's Suffrage Scheme. It enabled people who could not afford membership fees to become members simply by pledging their allegiance which widened the demographic and increased the membership. From a membership of 21,571 in 1910, by 1913 39,000 "friends" had enrolled. From 200 branches in 1910 there were 602 in 1914. At this time NUWSS leaders, particularly in the North, increasingly identified with the working classes and for an industrial town like Leigh this was particularly pertinent.

== Leigh municipal elections 1912 ==
Mrs Mottram’s feminism and Labour politics came together during Leigh’s 1912 and 1913 municipal elections. Mr J L Prescott, the successful Labour candidate for St Mary’s Ward in 1912, acknowledged that the work of Mrs Mottram and the Women’s Labour League co-workers had been a big factor in his success against the Liberal J. Sargent. It is possible that Mrs Mottram’s co-workers were drawn from the women’s sections of all Leigh’s political parties.

In 1912 Mrs Nessie Egerton Stewart Brown, President of the Lancashire and Cheshire Women’s Liberal Association warned that its members were losing patience with the Lancashire and Cheshire Liberal Association’s refusal to discuss the question of Women’s Suffrage. At the same time Leigh’s Liberal women were offered an alternative. The NUWSS, which contained a large Liberal contingent, disappointed by the Liberal Party’s continual rejection of women’s suffrage reached an agreement with the Labour Party. The Labour Party was the only party to pledge its complete support for Women’s Suffrage, the NUWSS agreed to support Labour Parliamentary and municipal candidates. The Conservative Party in the main, were anti-women’s suffrage. In the 1913 St Mary’s Ward, Conservative Councillor W.R.Boydell fighting for re-election in 1913 had no women helpers, despite there being a large Women’s Unionist Association in the ward. The victor, Labour’s J.H. Wright, when praising the WLL canvassers, commented that Boydell had had to do "all the spade work himself". W.R. Boydell and George Hunter, Liberal Councillor for St Mary’s in 1911, was a proven women’s suffragist. In 1911, at the request of the NUWSS, Leigh Council was one of 146 County, Borough and District Councils, to petition Parliament in support of enfranchising women householders. In council, it was Councillor Hunter who moved the resolution with Councillor Boydell seconding.

== Wider involvement ==
Throughout this period the NUWSS called on its member societies to take part in the mass demonstrations and rallies. As a significant proportion of the participants were northern working women, prominent among these being pit brow women and mill workers, in all probability some Leigh women were represented. Despite details of ordinary women’s personal involvement being hard to find, there is evidence that members of the Leigh Women’s Suffrage Society spent weeks making goods to sell on the Leigh, Wigan, Farnworth and Eccles stall at the 1912 NUWSS fund-raising bazaar at the Midland Hotel, Manchester.
