= Elizabeth McCracken (Irish writer) =

Irish unionist suffragette and author (c. 1871–1944)

Elizabeth Anne Maud McCracken (The writer L.A.M. Priestly)
- Born: c. 1871
- Died: 3 January 1944 (age approximately 73)
- Burial place: Bangor New Cemetery, Co Down
- Occupations: Suffragette, author, journalist
- Notable work: The Feminine in Fiction, Love Stories of Eminent Women
- Spouse: George McCracken
- Children: 3

Elizabeth "Lisbeth" Anne Maud McCracken (c. 1871 – 1944), was a women's suffragist and—under her maiden name L.A.M. Priestly—a feminist writer, active in the north of Ireland. Although unionist herself, with other members of the Belfast Irish Women's Suffrage Society she joined the Women's Social and Political Union in declaring a direct-action campaign against Ulster Unionists for their refusal in 1914 to honour a votes-for-women pledge. During the First World War she stood with Sylvia Pankhurst in opposing the WPSU's political truce with the government. She continued, both then and after the postwar achievement of the vote, to campaign on issues of domestic violence, equal pay and sex discrimination.

She is sometimes confused in bibliographies with her contemporary, the American feminist writer, Elizabeth McCracken (1876-1964), author of The Women of America (1904).

== Personal life ==
Sources provide conflicting information about Elizabeth's birth and childhood. The 1901 census records her age as 31 and married to George McCracken, a Belfast solicitor, however, the 1911 census records her age as 37, and a journalist in the occupation column. The General Register Office Northern Ireland records state her age at death as 73. She had three sons; George Stavely (born 1901), Maurice Lee (born 1902) and James Priestly (born 1904). McCracken lived in later years between Seafield House, Bangor and Brae Lodge, Greyabbey, Co Down.

She is buried at Bangor New Cemetery, Co Down, Northern Ireland, following several years of illness.

== Writing ==
McCracken was a journalist and published author, writing under her maiden name L.A.M. Priestly. Her first book, Love Stories of Some Eminent Women was published by Henry J Davis, London in 1906. In The Feminine in Fiction published, with a foreword by Charlotte Despard, by Unwin in 1918, she dissected the relations between the sexes as described in the work of English novelists beginning with Charlotte Brontë. She chronicled the progression of the female heroine "from a passive creature with whom fortune played, willy-nilly, subordinate to the conventions of sex, a spectator in the game of life" to the New Woman ideal of Sarah Grand— "a capable being, with power and opportunity to shape her own lot".

Writing as L.A.M. Priestly or L.A.M. Priestly-McCracken, she contributed to journals that ranged from the English suffragist journal The Vote and the more overtly feminist The Irish Citizen, to The Irish Presbyterian and the theosophist journal The Herald of the Star. Some of her articles were collected and published as popular pamphlets.

== Politics ==
The Irish Citizen sets the line the editorial line that McCracken ("L.A.M. Priestley") followed in "Must Suffrage Cease?"

Filling out her household's 1911 census form, under "Specific Illnesses" McCracken wrote "Unenfranchised". She joined the Irish Women's Suffrage Society (first formed in Belfast as the North of Ireland Women's Suffrage Society by Isabella Tod in 1872) which associated the vote with ending a "the conspiracy of silence" on a range of pressing social issues. Weekly meetings in Belfast discussed temperance (McCracken was also involved in the White ribbon movement), infant mortality, sex education, venereal disease, sex trafficking, protective factory legislation for women and equal opportunities.

In 1913, McCracken celebrated the "marriage of unionism and women's suffrage". She had not been impressed by what was then, with well over 100,000 members, the largest women's political group in Ireland, the Ulster Women's Unionist Council (UWUC). Writing to the Belfast News Letter, she noted the failure Unionist women to formulate "any demand on their own behalf or that of their own sex". But in September 1913, following reports that the Women's Social and Political Union would begin organising in Ulster, the Ulster Unionist Council announced that the draft articles of the Provisional Government (readied for Ulster should a Dublin parliament be restored) included votes for women. With regard to an Irish parliament the nationalists would make no such undertaking.

The rapprochement with Unionists, however, was short lived. In March 1914, after being door-stepped for four days in London, Edward Carson ruled that Unionists could not take a position on so divisive an issue as women's suffrage. Dorothy Evans, the WSPU organiser in Belfast, declared an end to "the truce we have held in Ulster".

With Margaret MacCoubrey, Dr. Elizabeth Bell, Winifred Carney and others in the IWSS (formally disbanded in April 1914), McCracken had joined the WSPU. But it is not clear what direct hand she had, if any, in the campaign that followed: targeting Unionist properties and culminating in Lilian Metge's bombing of Lisburn Cathedral. Her husband, George McCracken, "appeared in the interests of the WSPU" in court when Evans and Madge Muir created an uproar demanding to know why James Craig, who was then arming Unionists with smuggled German munitions, was not appearing on the same weapons and explosives charges.

At the outbreak of world war, in The Irish Citizen, the paper of the pacifist Hanna Sheehy-Skeffington's Dublin-based Irish Women's Franchise League, McCracken asked "Shall Suffrage Cease?" She denounced the hypocrisy of men who, having subjected militant suffragists to a campaign "vituperation and invective", now, "with the most unblushing effrontery", asked women to approve "the most aggravated form of militancy—war". "What country is theirs", she asked, "who are defrauded of citizenship". In 1915, she invited Sylvia Pankhurst, who opposed the wartime suspension of WSPU agitation by her sister Christabel, to Belfast to speak in support equal pay for women doing war work.

After the war and the grant of the vote to women over the age of 30, in what was now Northern Ireland McCracken wished to see women stand as parliamentary candidates independent of parties. The alternative, she believed, was to remain the "docile" instruments of "men's plans", whether they be unionist or nationalist.

McCracken continued to campaign. She was particularly concerned with violence against women and girls and with the financial and legal dependence of women upon men upon which it fed. In reinforcing this dependence, she argued that the privacy of the home pressured women to keep domestic rape and abuse silent.

== Published work as L.A.M Priestly ==
1906 Love Stories of Some Eminent Women, Henry J Davis, London.

1914 "Shall Suffrage Cease?" The Irish Citizen, 29 August 1914

1915 "Co-operative Housekeeping", The Irish Citizen, 16 October

1918 The Feminine in Fiction, G Allen & Unwin, London

1919 First Causes.

1919 "Wife Beating", The Irish Citizen, September.

1928 The Story of County Down (a contribution to fundraising efforts for the maternity hospital).

1933 "Mme Sarah Grand and Women's Emancipation", The Vote 34 (24 August): 244.

== Papers ==
The National Library of Ireland holds a collection of McCracken's extensive correspondence with Hanna Sheehy-Skeffington.
