= Killeavy Castle =

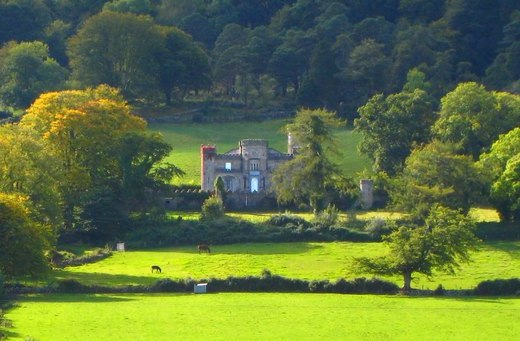
- Killeavy Castle near Slieve Gullion Forest Park
- Interactive map of the Killeavy Castle area

General information
- Location: County Armagh, Northern Ireland
- Coordinates: 54.123°N 6.411°W
- Construction started: 1810-1820
- Completed: 1836
- Cost: Approx

Killeavy Castle is a Grade A listed 19th-century castle in County Armagh, Northern Ireland. It was built for the Foxall family between 1810 and 1820 and was later designed to resemble Gosford Castle in Markethill, also in County Armagh. Plans for castle's restoration were announced in 2013 with a £1 million grant from Invest Northern Ireland.

== History ==
Starting life as a country farmhouse, the building was owned by the Foxall family between 1810 and 1820 who later commissioned architect George Papworth to add four towers, outbuildings and add Tudor-style windows to the building in 1836. By 1881 the castle had come into the ownership of the Bell family where it remained until the death of Maureen Bell in 2000. The castle has since been sold at auction for £1.19 million and was granted £1 million by Invest Northern Ireland for restoration.
