= Elizabeth Gould Bell =

One of the first women to qualify as a doctor in Ireland

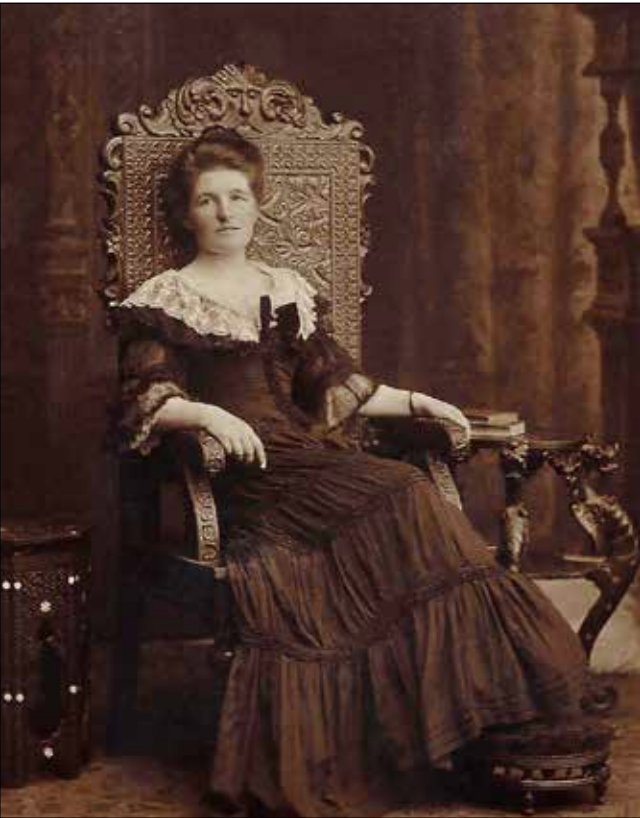
- Born: 24 December 1862; Newry, Ireland
- Died: 9 July 1934 (aged 71); Belfast, Northern Ireland
- Education: Queen's College Belfast (RUI)
- Occupation: Doctor
- Known for: Being one of the first women medical graduates in Ireland, and for her direct action commitment to women's suffrage.
- Movement: Irish Women's Suffrage Society, Women's Social and Political Union

Elizabeth Gould Bell (24 December 1862 – 9 July 1934) was the first woman to practice as a qualified medical doctor in the north of Ireland—in Ulster—and was a vocal and militant suffragist. In a protest action by the Women's Social and Political Union, in 1913–14, she engaged in a series of arson attacks directed against the Unionist establishment in Belfast. Amnestied at the outbreak of the First World War, she became one of the first women to work with the Royal Army Medical Corps. In her last years, she continued to campaign for maternity and child welfare services.

== Family and education ==
Elizabeth Gould Bell was born in Newry, County Armagh, in Ireland in 1862. Her mother, Margaret Smith Bell, was from a local farming family. Her father, Joseph Bell of Killeavy Castle, was a Clerk for the Newry Poor Law Union.

Having, in 1889, been the first woman admitted to the Medical Faculty of Queen's College, Belfast (Royal University of Ireland), in 1893 she and her sister Margaret were among the first women to obtain a medical degree in Ireland. Elizabeth was the first (as a general practitioner and gynaecologist in Belfast) to practice in Ulster. Margaret entered general practice in Manchester.

In 1896, Bell married general practitioner Dr. Hugo Fisher, at the Fitzroy Presbyterian Church in Belfast. Fisher died of typhoid fever in 1901.The couple had one son, Hugh Bell Fisher. He was a twenty-year-old medical student at Queen's University, Belfast, and a lieutenant in the 2nd Battalion of the Royal Munster Fusiliers, when, in November 1917, he died in a German field hospital in Belgium from wounds received at Passchendaele, in the Second Battle of Ypres.

== Professional life ==
Bell established her practice in Great Victoria Street in central Belfast, attending mostly to women and young children. She was the medical officer (later honorary physician) to a precursor of the non-denominational Belfast Midnight Mission rescue and maternity home’ (later Malone Place Hospital), which assisted homeless and unmarried mothers. She was also an honorary physician at the Belfast Babies Home and Training School at The Grove. In 1896 Bell wrote and published "A Curious Condition of Placenta and Membranes" for the annual report of the British Medical Association, North of Ireland Branch.

In 1916, Bell volunteered to work with the Royal Army Medical Corps (RAMC). She was one of the first women to join the group. Women doctors at the time did not classify or rank as members of the military, but rather as "civilian surgeons." They were afforded pay, rations, travelling allowances, and gratuity equal to that received by "temporarily-commissioned" male officer. She was posted on a one-year contract to Malta to work with the Women's Medical Unit, at St. Andrew's Military Hospital. The hospital treated British, French, and ANZAC wounded evacuated from Gallipoli.

In July 1917, Bell returned to Belfast to resume work as a general practitioner.

== Suffragist militant ==
Perhaps as early as her medical school days, Bell joined the North of Ireland Women's Suffrage Society (from 1909, the Irish WSS). The society had been established in Belfast by Isabella Tod in 1872 and had helped secure women in Belfast a municipal (propertied) franchise in 1888. In the WSS Bell associated the achievement of a full, equal, parliamentary franchise with ending "the conspiracy of silence" on a range of issues pressing upon women. Weekly meetings in Belfast discussed temperance, infant mortality, sex education, venereal disease, white slave trafficking, protective factory legislation for women and equal opportunities.

Bell also made contact in England with Emmeline Pankhurst and her daughters, Sylvia, Christabel, and Adela. In 1903 the Pankhursts established the Women's Social and Political Union (WSPU) with the slogan "Deeds not Words." In 1911, Bell participated in a WSPU demonstration in London, during which she and others broke the windows of Swan and Edgar's department store. She was arrested and was held in solitary confinement at Holloway Women's Prison.

In 1912, Bell attended, and assisted in the recovery of, women held on similar charges in the Crumlin Road Jail in Belfast. Following the growing militant practice, they had gone on hunger strike and been subject to force feeding.

In the summer of 1913, IWSS militants announced, "if legalised protection of little children could be brought a week nearer by our vote, [they] defied ... women ... to say that we would not be right to burn down every public building in the land". When in September 1913, Christabel Pankhurst sent Dorothy Evans over to organise the WSPU in Belfast, they and Bell joined in the effort. Superseded by the British organisation, in April 1914 the older society formally dissolved.

The day after the Belfast papers had reported that the WSPU would begin to organise in the city, the Ulster Unionist Council announced that the Provisional Government (readied for Ulster should a Home-Rule parliament be established in Dublin) would extend votes to women. With regard to an Irish parliament, the nationalists would make no such undertaking. What Elizabeth McCracken (the writer "L.A.M. Priestley" who had followed Bell from the IWSS) hailed as the "marriage of unionism and women's suffrage", did not last the winter. In March 1914, after being door-stepped for four days in London, Edward Carson ruled that Unionists could not take a position on so divisive an issue as women's suffrage. At a meeting in Belfast's Ulster Hall, Evans declared an end to "the truce we have held in Ulster".

Bell was actively involved in the militant campaign that followed. Five Unionist-owned buildings and related male recreational facilities, including Knock Golf Club, Newtownards Race Stand and Belfast Bowling and Tennis Club were burned and damaged. On 31 July 1914, in a plan hatched with Evans, Lillian Metge bombed the chancel of Lisburn Cathedral. Bell, who was to insist that she always made sure that the properties were empty before setting fire to them, was one of 13 suffragettes arrested.

Their trials and sentencing were interrupted by the European war. After its declaration of war upon Germany on 4 August, the British declared a general amnesty with regard to women suffragist prisoners. Over the objections of Evans, Bell, McCracken and others, Christabel Pankhurst responded by directing an immediate and absolute cessation of the suffragette campaign throughout Britain and the closure of WSPU offices in Belfast.

== Last years ==
In July 1916, Bell left with the RAMC for Malta. In 1918, the year after she returned to Belfast, the parliamentary vote was granted to women over 30. Equal voting rights followed in 1928.

In February 1919, Bell became the Medical Officer for a residence hall in her alma mater, now Queen's University. From 1922 to 1926, she assisted with the Belfast Corporation's Babies' Club welfare scheme, a project that donated milk to poverty-stricken mothers.

Bell continued in practice until her death in 1934. Obituaries acknowledged her "striking personality and intellect." In 2016, the Ulster History Circle placed a Blue Plaque commemorating Bell as "one of the first women medical graduates in Ireland 1893" at Daisy Hill Hospital which occupies the site of the Newry Workhouse close to where Dr Bell was brought up and where her father worked.
