= Isabella Tod =

Scottish suffragist

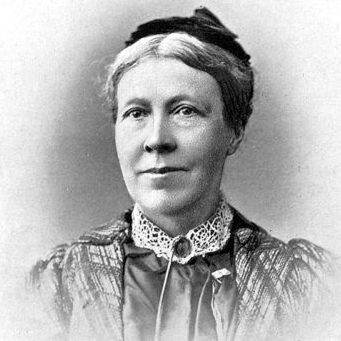
- Born: 18 May 1836; Edinburgh, Scotland
- Died: 8 December 1896 (aged 60); Belfast, Ireland
- Occupations: Women's rights campaigner, suffragette
- Organization(s): North of Ireland Women's Suffrage Society, Ladies National Association for the Repeal of the Contagious Diseases Acts, Belfast Women's Temperance Association, Irish Women's Liberal Unionist Association

Isabella Maria Susan Tod (18 May 1836 – 8 December 1896) was a Scottish-born campaigner in Ireland for women’s civil and political equality. She lobbied for women’s rights to education and to property, for the dignified treatment of those drawn into the sex trade and, as an Irish unionist, for female suffrage. In 1887, her North of Ireland Suffrage Society helped secure the municipal vote for women in Belfast.

== Life ==
Tod was born in Edinburgh and was educated at home by her mother, Maria Isabella Waddell, who came from County Monaghan, Ireland. Her father was James Banks Tod, a merchant from Edinburgh. In the 1850s she moved with her mother to Belfast. She was a contributor to the Dublin University Magazine, an independent literary and political magazine; the Presbyterian newspaper, The Banner of Ulster (under the editorship of the veteran tenant righter James MacKnight); and, in the 1880s, the Northern Whig, the liberal rival to the Belfast News Letter.

In 1868, Tod was the only woman to give evidence to a select committee inquiry on the reform of the married women’s property law in 1868. In 1872, after completing a speaking tour of Ireland, and with the support of William Johnston MP and of his nationalist counterpart, Joseph Biggar MP, she established the North of Ireland Women's Suffrage Society.

Ireland had not been included in the local government acts that enfranchised single and widowed women ratepayers in England and Scotland in 1869 and 1882 respectively. Determined lobbying by Tod and her society ensured that in creating a municipal franchise for the new "city" of Belfast, the Municipal Corporation of Belfast Act 1887 (guided through Parliament by Johnston) conferred the vote on persons rather than men. This was eleven years before women elsewhere Ireland gained the vote in local government elections.

In 1874, Margaret Byers Tod formed the Belfast Women's Temperance Association, and together they campaigned for secondary and tertiary education for girls. She had helped Byers establish The Ladies' Collegiate School Belfast (Victoria College) (1859), and was instrumental in the foundation of the Queen's Institute Dublin (1861), Alexandra College Dublin (1866), and the Belfast Ladies' Institute (1867). Advancing, in The Education of Girls of the Middle Classes (1874), a programme of education to prepare women for gainful employment, Tod lobbied for the inclusion of girls within the terms of the Intermediate Education (Ireland) Act 1878.

Along with Anna Haslam, a Quaker from Youghal, she was on the executive committee of the Ladies National Association for the Repeal of the Contagious Diseases Acts. They campaigned, with success in 1886, for the repeal of the acts, on the grounds that the legislative attempt to protect the health of soldiers forced medical examinations upon prostitutes that violated the women's civil liberties. Tod insisted on the humanity of women engaged in the sex trade, and on a recognition of the trade’s root causes: poverty, “inequality of law” and “inequality of social judgement”.

Tod and Halsam also campaigned, with less success, for women to be able to serve as Poor Law Guardians. In 1896, a bill was passed allowing with certain property qualifications to serve, but by the end of the century out of 8,000 Poor Law Guardians in Ireland only 85 were women.

When, in 1888 the Women’s Liberal Federation split on the issue of Irish Home Rule, Tod, citing the threat of a socially-conservative majority in an Irish parliament, co-founded the Irish Women's Liberal Unionist Association. She believed "that petty legislature of the character which would be inevitable" under home rule would block further advances for women: "I perceived that [it] would be the stoppage of the whole work of social reform for which we had laboured so hard".

That work was continued into the new century, in Belfast, by the NIWS—from 1909, the Irish Women's Suffrage Society—engaging, among others, Dr. Elizabeth Bell, the city's first practicing female doctor and gynecologist, and the writer Elizabeth McCracken ("L.A.M. Priestley").

Tod died at 71 Botanic Avenue, Belfast on 8 December 1896 from pulmonary tuberculosis. She is buried in Balmoral Cemetery in South Belfast.

== Commemoration ==
In October 2013 Margaret Mountford presented a BBC Two Northern Ireland documentary called Groundbreakers: Ulster's Forgotten Radical, which highlighted the life of Isabella Tod.

== See also ==
- List of suffragists and suffragettes
- List of women's rights activists
- Timeline of women's suffrage
