= Young Hot Bloods =

British suffragette group

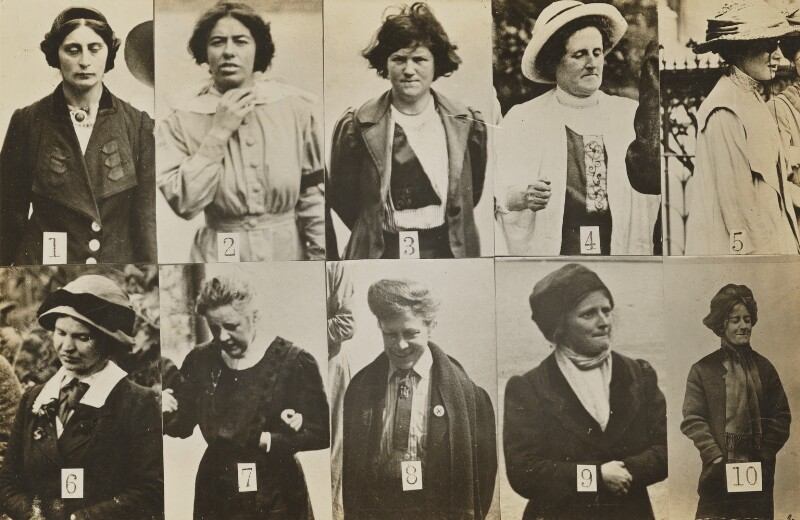
Militant Suffagettes for surveillance sheet 1. Margaret Scott (Margaret Gertrude Schencke) 2. Olive Leared (née Hockin) 3. Margaret McFarlane Mary Wyan and others; (Note: Full list of those included in the composite photograph is as follows: 1 Margaret Scott (Margaret Gertrude Schencke), 2 Olive Leared (née Hockin), 3. Margaret McFarlane, 4. Mary Wyan (Mary Ellen Taylor), 5. Annie Bell 6. Jane Short, 7. Gertrude Ansell 8. Maud Brindley, 9. Verity Oates, 10. Evelyn Manesta) UK Criminal Record Office via the National Portrait Gallery, London

The Young Hot Bloods (YHB) were a secret group of young unmarried suffragettes of the Women's Social and Political Union (WSPU) who undertook militant campaigning activity and pledged to "danger duty".

== History ==
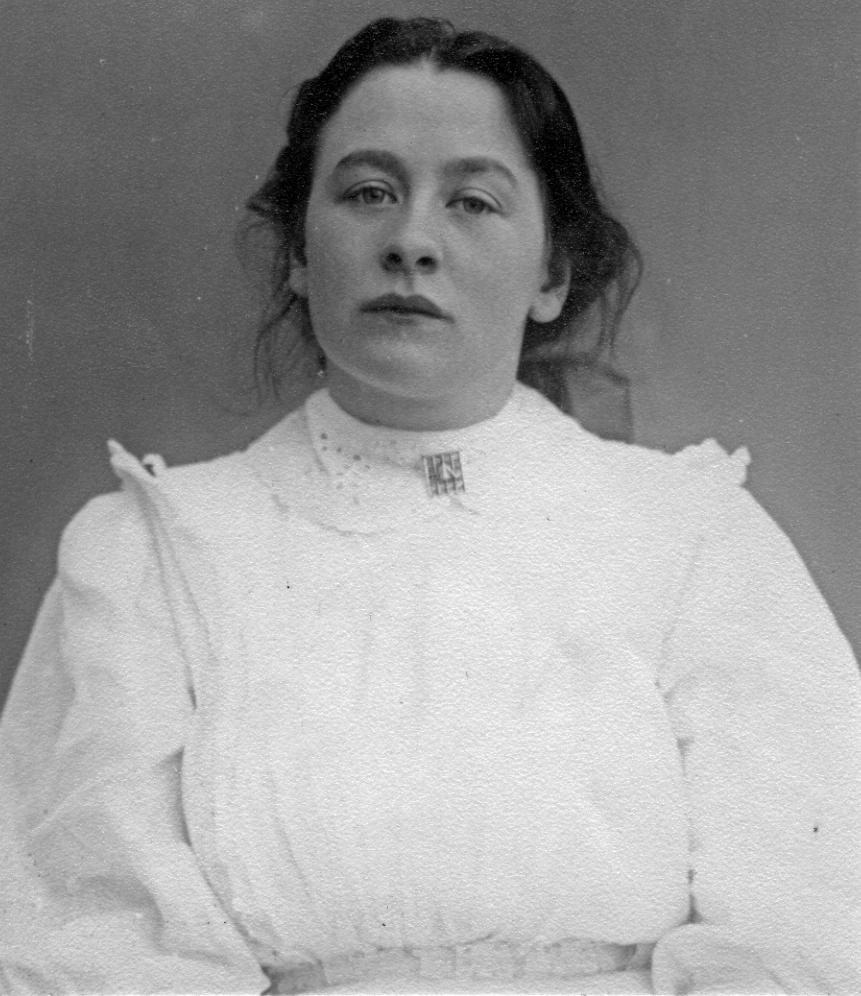
Adela Pankhurst

The Young Hot Bloods were formed by Jessie Kenney and Adela Pankhurst in 1907. The group's name derived from a comment in the Scotsman newspaper about Emmeline Pankhurst: "Mrs Pankhurst will of course be followed blindly by a number of the younger and more hot-blooded members of the Union”. Their meetings were held at a tea shop in the Strand.

Members were under 30 years old, unmarried and pledged to undertake "danger duty". They were assigned an older suffragette to accompany them during operations.

The YHB group remained secret until May 1913, when it was uncovered during the conspiracy trial of eight members of the suffragette leadership, including Rachel Barrett, Flora Drummond and Annie Kenney.

== Notable members ==
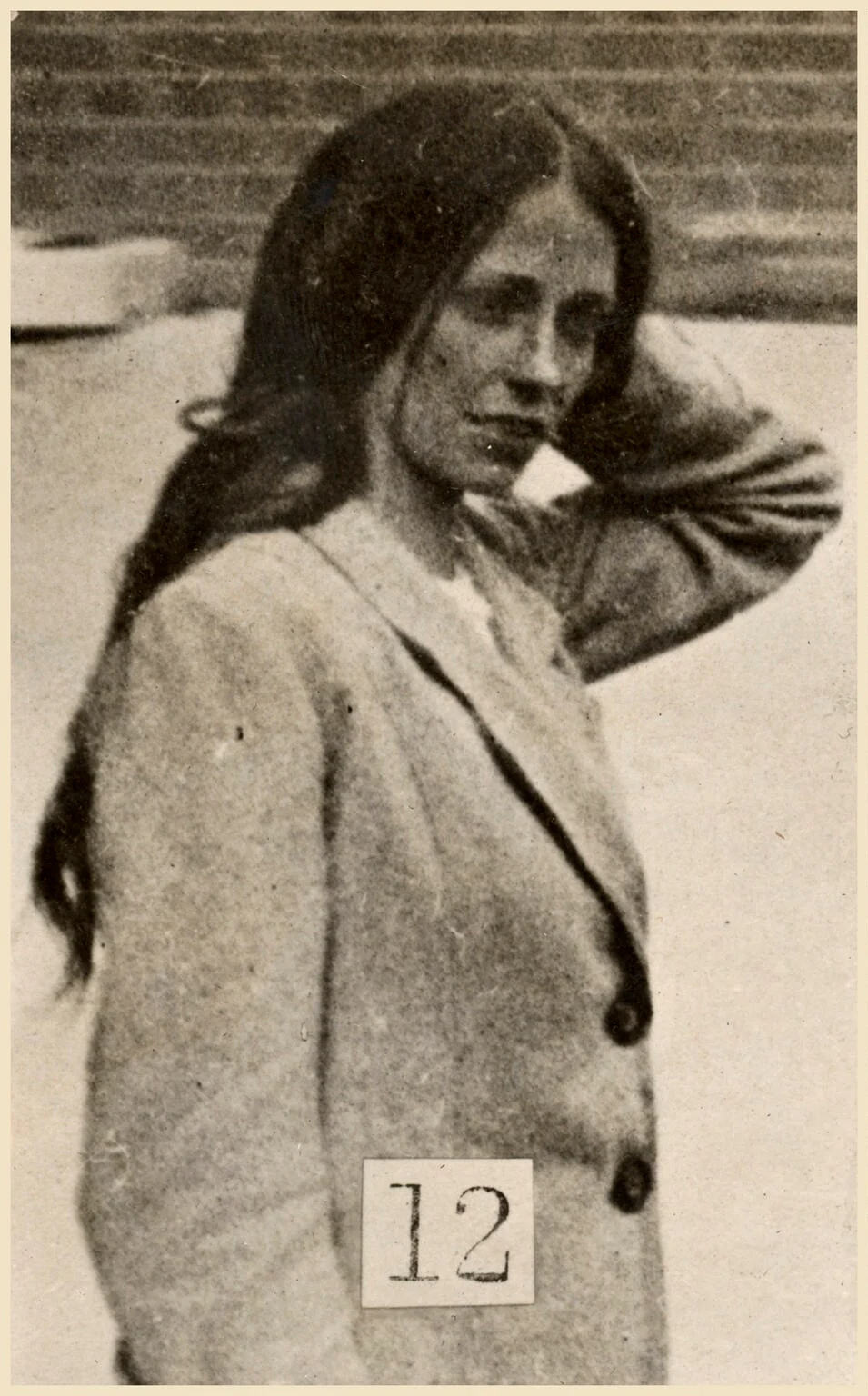
Photograph of Lilian Lenton created by the United Kingdom's Criminal Record Office

- Olive Beamish
- Hilda Burkitt
- Eileen Mary Casey
- Helen Millar Craggs
- Irene Dallas
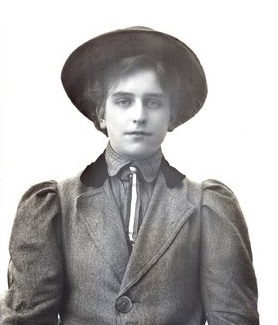
- Vera Wentworth in 1909
  Elsie Duval
- Clara Giveen
- Olive Hockin
- Vera Holme
- Elsie Howey
- Jessie Kenney
- Mary Leigh
- Lilian Lenton
- Kitty Marion
- Stella Newsome
- Adela Pankhurst
- Christabel Pankhurst
- Miriam Pratt
- Grace Roe
- Jane Short
- Norah Smyth
- Jessie Stephen
- Florence Tunks
- Vera Wentworth

== Activities ==
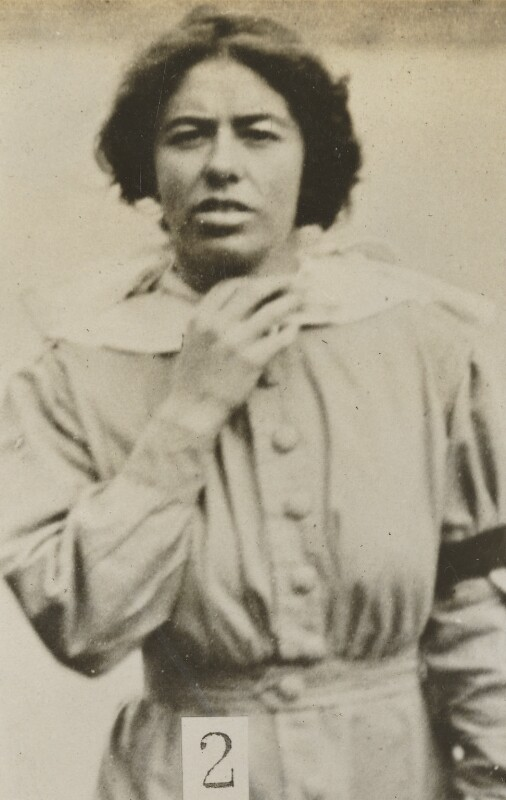
Photograph of Olive Hockin created by the United Kingdom's Criminal Record Office.

In 1908, the YHB choir sang outside Holloway Prison to keep up morale for suffragette inmates. In 1909, a public exhibition of photographs of YHB militant campaigners was organised in London. Militant action included bombs on commuter trains and attacks on MPs’ houses, churches, museums, racecourses, sports grounds and post boxes throughout Britain.

YHB member Olive Hockin was arrested in 1913 after arson attacks on the Roehampton Golf Club and on a house at Walton Heath in Surrey belonging to politician David Lloyd George. Her flat was said to contain stones, kerosene and false car number plates. She was convicted and sentenced to four months imprisonment. Hockin claimed she was not guilty of the charges and objected to the male-dominated justice system, saying that: "a court composed entirely of men have no moral right to convict and sentence a woman, and until women have the power of voting I shall continue to defy the law, whether I am in prison or out of it." Fellow prisoner Margaret Scott, claimed that Hockin carved the chair in her cell.

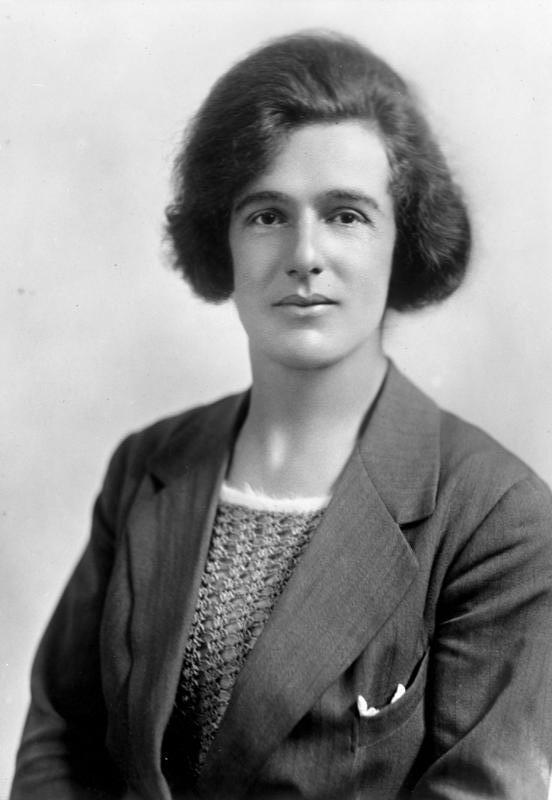
Jessie Stephen

On 19 March 1913, Olive Beamish (who used the alias Phyllis Brady) and Elsie Duval (who used the alias Millicent Dean) set fire to Trevethan House, the unoccupied home of Lady Amy White, widow of Field Marshal George White, in Egham, Surrey. The fire caused £2,000-£3,000 of damage. They were sentenced to 6 weeks imprisonment in Holloway Prison. Both went on hunger strike and were the first prisoners released under the Prisoners (Temporary Discharge for Ill Health) Act 1913, known as the Cat and Mouse Act.

On 17 May 1913, YHB member Miriam Pratt set fire to an empty building of the Balfour Biological Laboratory for Women in Cambridge, with a paraffin-soaked cloth. She chose this target as "what good was a university laboratory, and a university education, if women were refused the right to be awarded their degrees?"

Jessie Stephen dropped acid bombs into pillar boxes across Glasgow.

Kitty Marion is often cited as being responsible for the arson attack on the former home of the Hastings MP Arthur Du Cros, Levetleigh, in East Sussex. There was motive for suffragists to have started the fire and an apparent claim that they had done so in the form of a note in the ruins. Although no contemporary police records or court proceedings document Marion's involvement in setting the Levetleigh fire, in 2018 Ferne Riddell published a book Death in Ten Minutes: The forgotten life of radical suffragette Kitty Marion, drawing on an unpublished autobiography written by Marion in her later life and held in the archives of the Museum of London, in which she claimed responsibility for the attack.

== Reception ==
The Sheffield Evening Telegraph described the group in 1913:

"Some of the younger members of the Women’s Social and Political Union are still more difficult to deal with . . . Curiously enough, these young hot bloods are not the women who would get a vote . . . they own no property, and are not married women . . . none of them are likely to get the vote, and personally, I am convinced that they don’t care about it. What they want is the excitement and morbid satisfaction of doing something wrong."

A secret bomb disposal unit hidden on Duck Island in St James's Park, London, was established in response to the YHB bombing attacks.

== Legacy ==
Although the YHB were instrumental in raising the pressure the suffragette movement could apply to the government, they and their efforts were for a while largely played down in historical writings about the movement in favour of mentioning the suffragists of the National Union of Women's Suffrage Societies. Hannah Awcock writing for turbulentisles.com sees this as a result of pressure to conform to patriarchal expectations.

== See also ==
- Women's Social and Political Union
- List of suffragette bombings
- Suffragette bombing and arson campaign
- Timeline of women's suffrage
