= Miriam Pratt =

English suffragette and arsonist (1893–1975)

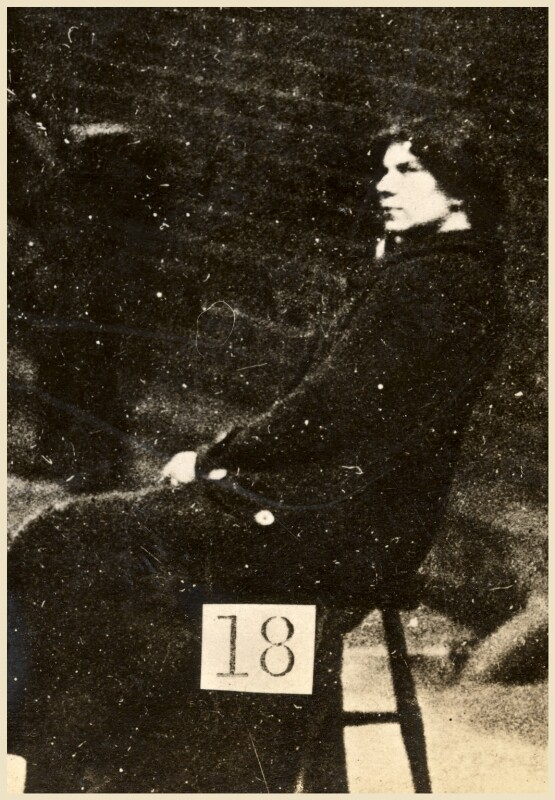
- Born: 26 January 1893; Windlesham, Surrey, England
- Died: 24 June 1975 (aged 82); Epsom, Surrey, England
- Occupations: Teacher and suffragette
- Known for: Arson
- Spouse: Bernard Francis

Miriam Annie Pratt (26 January 1893 – 24 June 1975) was an English suffragette and arsonist, known for setting fire to two unoccupied buildings in Cambridge in 1913.

== Early life ==
Pratt was born in Windlesham, Surrey, in 1893. When she was eight she went to live in Norwich with her childless aunt, Harriet, and her husband William Ward; he was a police officer.

== Suffragette activity ==
In 1913 she was working at St Paul's National School in Norwich. She had joined the suffragettes; other leading suffragettes in Norfolk included Caprina Fahey, Princess Sophia Duleep Singh, and Grace Marcon.

On 17 May 1913 Pratt and an unnamed person used paraffin to set alight two houses under construction on Storey's Way in Cambridge. A house which was being built for a widow was burnt out; at a building which was being erected for Reginald Punnett, the new Arthur Balfour Professor of Genetics, (Note: Punnett's building, No. 44, later called Whittingehame Lodge, comprised a house, laboratory, and caretaker’s cottage; it was associated with the Balfour Biological Laboratory for Women, Whittingehame Lodge is now part of Churchill College) the damage was confined to a staircase and some woodwork. Pratt made the point that although women were getting a university education, they were not being given Cambridge degrees because of their gender.

Along with suffragette literature, Pratt, for some reason, left her gold watch at the scene and this was later identified by her uncle William Ward as a watch he had given her. There was also blood where a window had been interfered with and Pratt had a small wound on her hand. She was arrested on 22 May 1913, and was suspended from her job. She was remanded for a few days before a friend (and later Member of Parliament), Dorothy Jewson, paid the £200 bail. While awaiting trial she was at a protest at her local market in Norwich against the Cat and Mouse Act.

When the case went to court in October, she decided to be her own defence counsel. She interrogated her uncle, a police officer, as his evidence to the court had been based on conversations with her that he had made without giving her a police caution. However, she was convicted based on her own confession given in her summing up of the case. She was sentenced by Mr Justice Bray to eighteen months in jail, was sacked from her job and was taken to Holloway Prison. Pratt went on hunger strike for five days and was force fed. She was released under the terms of the Cat and Mouse Act as the doctor was concerned about her heart from the force feeding, with the medical recommendation of three months' rest. She did not return to prison.

While she was in prison Pratt's photograph was taken. This photo was combined with others to create a page that could be shown to policemen so that they could identify suspicious characters. She was labelled number 18 on an identification sheet that also included Sarah Jane Baines, Lillian Forrester, Clara Elizabeth Giveen, Miss Johansen, Lilian Lenton, Kitty Marion (Katherina Maria Schafer) and Mary Richardson. These sheets were circulated in 1914.

== Later life ==
Pratt left the WSPU when the organisation supported the First World War and suspended campaigning for the vote. She returned to Norwich and married Bernard Francis on 19 May 1915. He had been a member of the Men's League For Women's Suffrage and joined the Royal Engineers early in the war, reaching the rank of lieutenant.

In 1936, William Ward (her uncle), died and left his niece, now called Miriam Francis, a half share of his property. By then she had moved to London and worked as an assistant company secretary.

Pratt died age 82 in 1975 in Horton Hospital, a psychiatric hospital in Epsom, Surrey.

== See also ==
- Young Hot Bloods
