= Fern Riddell =

British historian

- Born: 22 January 1986 (age 40)
- Citizenship: United Kingdom
- Occupations: Historian, writer, historical consultant
- Years active: 2013–present

Academic background
- Education: Barton Court Grammar School
- Alma mater: Royal Holloway, University of London; King's College London
- Thesis: Vice and Virtue: Pleasure, Morality and Sin in London's Music Halls, 1850–1939 (2016)
- Doctoral advisor: Paul Readman; Arthur Burns
- Other advisor: Matthew Sweet

Academic work
- Discipline: History; Feminism
- Sub-discipline: Gender, sex and suffrage in Victorian Britain
- Notable works: Death in Ten Minutes: The Forgotten Life of Radical Suffragette Kitty Marion
- Website: Fern Riddell's website

Fern Riddell (/fɜːrn rɪˈdɛl/ FURN ri-DEL) (born 22 January 1986) is a British historian who specialises in gender, sex, suffrage and Victorian culture. She has written several popular history books and is a former columnist for the BBC History magazine.

== Early life and education ==
Riddell attended Barton Court Grammar School from 1997 to 2004. After a gap year, she studied history at Royal Holloway, University of London from 2005, graduating with a BA in 2008, and an MA in 2009. Between 2010 and 2016, she undertook a PhD thesis at King's College, London, entitled "Vice and Virtue: Pleasure, Morality and Sin in London's Music Halls 1850-1939". Her doctoral degree was supervised by Paul Readman and Arthur Burns, and examined by Matthew Sweet.

== Career ==
Riddell is a cultural historian who specialises in sex, the suffragette movement and women's struggle for equality. She has appeared on various BBC television and radio programmes. In 2013 she was selected as one of the BBC Expert Women, and took part in a training programme that improved women's media and communication skills. That year she was made one of BBC Radio 3's New Generation Thinkers. She has since acted as a researcher for the 2015 revival of Horrible Histories, seasons 13-14 of Who Do You Think You Are?, seasons 3-5 of Ripper Street, and Decline and Fall. She hosts Not What You Thought You Knew, a podcast for the History Channel.

Riddell extensively investigated the scrapbook of suffragette and birth control campaigner Kitty Marion. The scrapbook contained stories of her hunger strikes, arson attacks and prison escapes. Riddell has spoken about the sexual assault and harassment that Marion faced and how that fuelled her suffragette campaigning.

In 2018, after tweeting that she was "Dr Fern Riddell" and not Miss, Riddell she was subject to criticism on Twitter. To respond to those who deemed her arrogant and "immodest", she created the hashtag #ImmodestWomen, which saw thousands of women sharing their stories. In 2019 Riddell hosted her own BBC Four television programme, A Victorian Scandal: The Rudest Book in Britain. Riddell was a member of the Royal Holloway team on the 2019 University Challenge Christmas Special.

=== Books ===
Her publications include:

- Riddell, Fern (2026). Victoria's Secret: The Private Passion of a Queen. Ebury Press. p. 432. ISBN 978-1-5291-9933-8
- Riddell, Fern (2020). Sex Lessons From History. London: Hodder & Headline Ome. p. 288. ISBN 978-1473666269.
- Riddell, Fern (2018). Death in Ten Minutes: The Forgotten Life of Radical Suffragette Kitty Marion. London: Hodder & Stoughton. p. 352. ISBN 978-1473666184.
- Riddell, Fern (2014). The Victorian Guide to Sex: Desire and deviance in the 19th century. London: Pen & Sword Books Ltd. p. 176. ISBN 978-1781592861.

She has written for the Times Higher Education magazine, The Guardian, The Huffington Post and History Today. Riddell is active on social media, including Twitter (@FernRiddell) and Instagram (@fernriddell).
