= SO4 =

SO4 may refer to:

- National Identification Service, a department of the London Metropolitan Police which provides a range of support services on behalf of the Metropolitan Police and other police forces
- Star Ocean: The Last Hope, an action role-playing video game developed by Tri-Ace and Square Enix
- Sulfate, SO^{2−}_{4}, in chemistry, an inorganic ion or a salt of sulfuric acid.
- SO4 is an acronym for remembering the function of the fourth cranial nerve, the trochlear nerve, which control the superior oblique muscle of the eye.
- SO(4), the group of rotations in 4-dimensional Euclidean space
