= Evelyn Manesta =

British suffragette

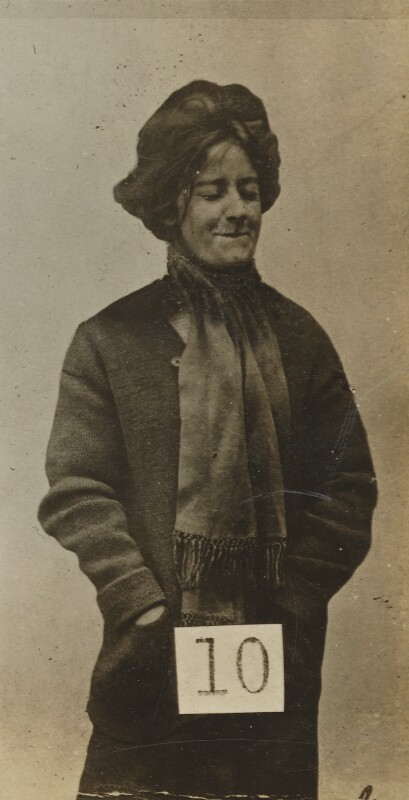
- Born: 1887 or 1888
- Died: unknown
- Occupation: Governess

Evelyn Manesta (born 1887 or 1888) was a British suffragette. There are few details about her birth or death but she is known for being identified as dangerous after attacking Manchester Art Gallery.

== Life (details known) ==
Along with Lillian Forrester and Annie Briggs she damaged several paintings in Manchester Art Gallery on 13 April 1913 and was arrested. They broke the glass and four of which were damaged by the broken glass.

Forrester, Manesta and Annie Briggs waited until the gallery was closing and then proceeded to break the glass on the most valuable paintings. The three attacked the glass of thirteen paintings including The Shadow of Death, two by John Everett Millais and two by George Frederic Watts. Staff were alerted by the sound of broken glass and the three were apprehended. Four of the paintings had been damaged by the broken glass. They were bailed to appear before magistrates the next day.

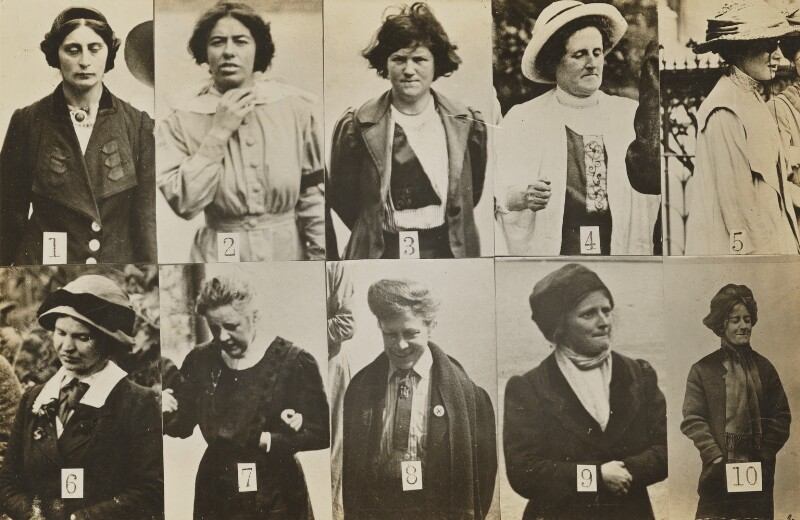
Militant Suffragettes as secretly identified by the Criminal Record Office (See No. 10)

During the subsequent court hearing she was described as a governess, aged 25. She was sentenced to one month in prison, while Forrester was sentenced to three months. During her trial Manesta made a speech to the jury in which she discussed the injustice of the law in treating men and women differently, especially with regard to the divorce law; she also stated that she was a political offender. The attack on the paintings was part of a wave of actions by suffragettes that day, in protest after Emmeline Pankhurst had been sentenced to three years' imprisonment. Elsewhere in Manchester women had poured ink into eleven letterboxes damaging 250 letters.

Manesta was photographed while in prison, with a warder's arm around her neck to hold her head upright so that her face could be seen, but that arm was edited out of the image before it was printed for circulation to other art galleries to help them recognise potential troublemakers.

The National Portrait Gallery holds three copies of this doctored photograph: included in a collective "Surveillance Photograph of Militant Suffragettes", in a "Criminal Record Office memorandum, Issued 24 April 1914" along with Lillian Forrester, and as a single image.
