= Kitty Marion =

Actress, suffragette, and birth control activist (1871–1944)

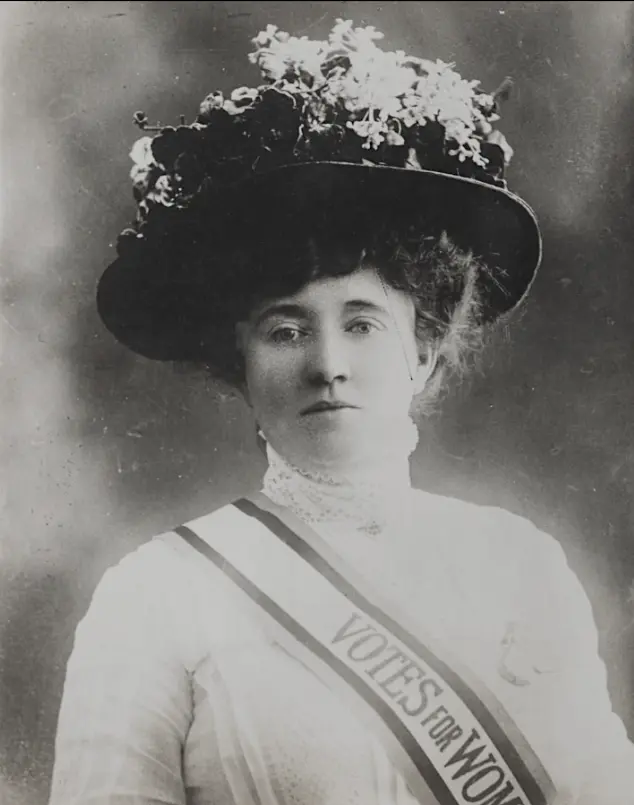
- Marion c. 1910
- Born: Katherina Maria Schäfer; 12 March 1871; Rietberg, Province of Westphalia, Kingdom of Prussia, German Empire
- Died: 9 October 1944 (aged 73); New York City, US
- Citizenship: Germany, United States (Note: She lost her German citizenship in 1901. She became a US citizen in 1922. She was never a British subject.)
- Occupations: Actress, activist, street vendor, teacher
- Known for: Suffrage, birth control advocacy, hunger strikes

Kitty Marion (born Katherina Maria Schäfer, 12 March 1871 – 9 October 1944) was an activist who advocated for women's suffrage and birth control. Born in the German Empire, she immigrated to England in 1886 when she was fifteen. She sang in music halls throughout the United Kingdom in the late 19th century, and became known in the entertainment industry for bringing attention to the sexism and sexual assaults that were common in the business.

Marion was a prominent member of the British suffrage movement, which campaigned for the right of women to vote. She began her advocacy by selling copies of the Votes for Women newspaper, then progressed to militant protests, vandalism, and riots. She was one of several suffragettes who conducted bombing and arson attacks throughout Britain. Marion was convicted and jailed several times for arson and bombing, and was subject to over two hundred force-feedings while on hunger strike in prison.

On the outbreak of World War I, Marion had to leave Britain because of her German origin, so she moved to the United States. She joined the birth control movement, and spent 13 years campaigning on street corners, selling Margaret Sanger's monthly magazine Birth Control Review. She relied on her personality and loud voice to engage passers-by, and became a well-known figure in New York City. Marion was arrested several times for distributing birth control information in violation of anti-obscenity laws. She died in New York in 1944.

== Early life ==
Katherina Maria Schäfer was born into a middle-class family in Rietberg in Westphalia, German Empire, on 12 March 1871. Her mother died of tuberculosis when she was two, leaving her with her father; four years later, her stepmother died of the same illness. As a child, Katherina enjoyed singing and reciting, and dreamed of performing on stage when she was grown. Her abusive father, who had a violent temper, often ridiculed her because of her red hair. When she was 15, her uncle helped her escape her father by secretly sending her to live with an aunt in England. (Note: In her autobiography, Marion deliberately omitted her father's name.)

== Acting career ==
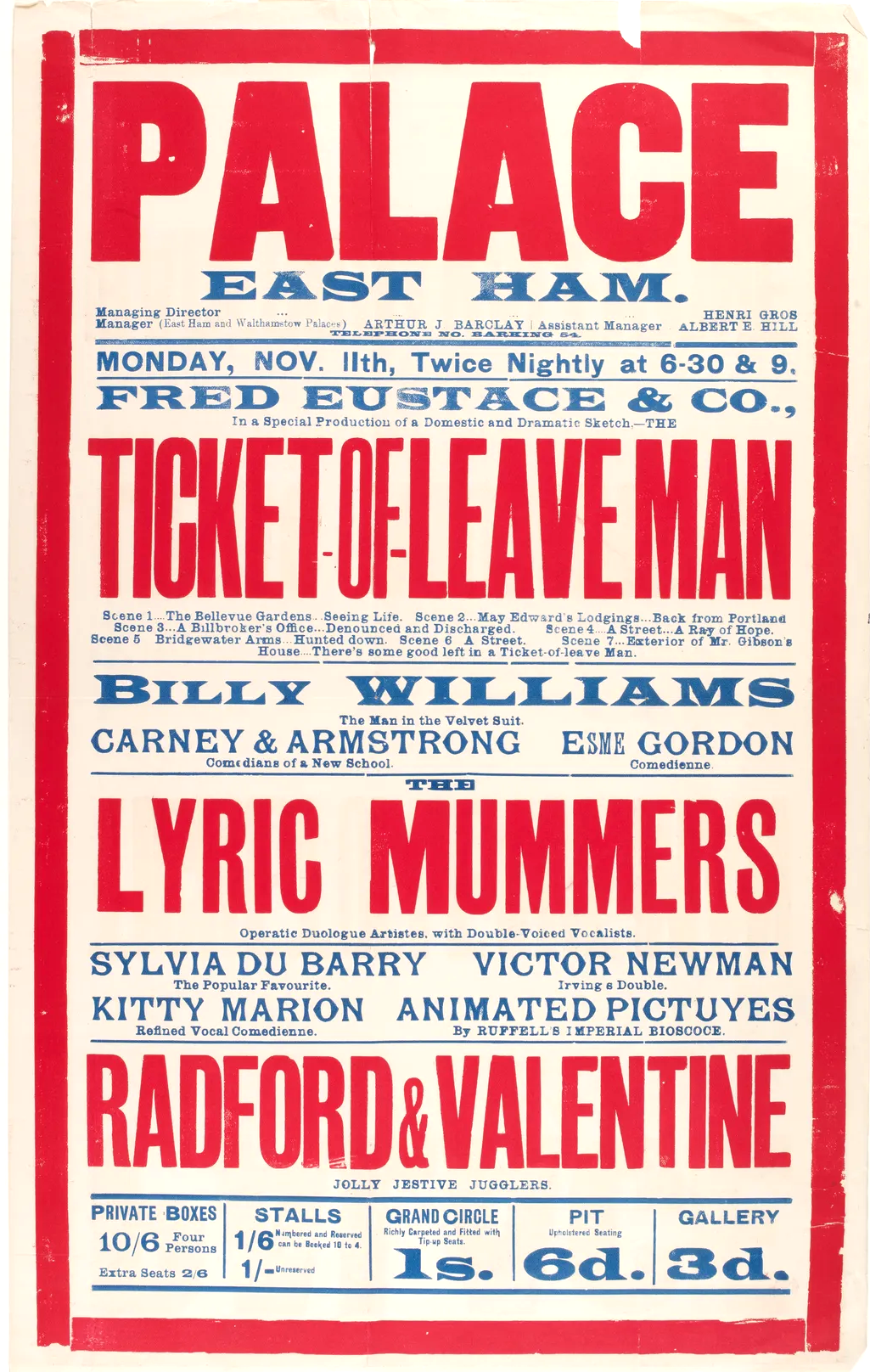
Kitty Marion is described as a "refined vocal comedienne" in this musical hall advertisement from 1907. (Note: The top-billed play is The Ticket-of-Leave Man.)

Upon arriving in England, Marion lived with her aunt in London's East End, and worked as a housekeeper. At the age of nineteen, she took classes in dance, and started working in the entertainment business: performing in pantomimes, plays, skits, and musical comedies across Britain. (Note: Working in the entertainment business exposed Marion to an environment that was more diverse and liberal than the rest of Victorian England, and the variety shows she performed in routinely included songs and skits that commented on current events.) She adopted the stage name Kitty Marion, which she would later take as her legal name when she became a United States citizen in 1922.

The working conditions for performers were harsh and workers were often exploited; women were expected to perform sexual favors in exchange for work opportunities and were frequently victims of sexual assault. In her autobiography, Marion recounted an incident with an agent she met with to inquire about a performance opportunity. When the agent tried to kiss her, she resisted, fell, and hit her head. He told her that she would not be able to succeed if she continued to refuse sexual advances from men in power. (Note: Marion was not alone: a movement against sexual assaults on women performers was in its infancy, and gaining momentum in the late 1800s.)

In 1906, Marion joined a union for actors – the Variety Artists Federation (VAF). Soon after joining the union, she wrote a letter to the editor of The Era newspaper, responding to an article which criticized actors' lack of loyalty to their agents. In the letter, Marion wrote that she had "given up hope for a woman who wants to earn her own living, and at the same time rise in the profession on her merits only, without influence of any sort." (Note: Letter published in The Era newspaper, 24 February 1906.) In the following weeks, many other actresses wrote to the newspaper, describing their own experiences with unethical business practices. Over time, Marion earned a reputation within the acting community as a vocal advocate for actresses.

During an acting career that spanned 24 years, Marion performed in a wide variety of theater works, including The Lady Slavey and The Forty Thieves. Although she never became a star performer, she had some measure of success. After 1912, her militant activities in the suffrage movement adversely affected her acting opportunities, because producers and agents did not want to be involved in controversies.

== Suffrage movement in the UK ==
While advocating for fellow performers, Marion was drawn to the suffrage movement in Britain, which campaigned for legislation that would give women the right to vote. She joined two suffrage organizations: the Women's Social and Political Union (WSPU) in 1908, and the Actresses' Franchise League in 1909. One of her first tasks for the WSPU was selling copies of their newspaper, Votes for Women, on the streets. (Note: She started selling copies of the Votes for Women newspaper in late 1908 or early 1909.)

The WSPU, founded in 1903, initially relied on lobbying and peaceful marches, but, by 1907, it began to use violence to achieve its goals. (Note: The motto of the WSPU was "Deeds, not words.") Marion endorsed the militant activism of the WSPU, and often participated in marches which turned into violent clashes with police. In 1908, Marion joined a large group of WSPU activists who invaded the House of Commons, resulting in a violent riot involving 5,000 police officers. Later violent acts committed by Marion included smashing windows of Sainsbury's on Regent Street in London; (Note: In her memoir, Marion wrote of the window-smashing incident: "I broke those windows deliberately, as a protest against the Government for not dealing in a fair and straightforward manner with Woman Suffrage... Women desire to obey the law..., but they also desire a voice in the making of the law.... Speaking from my own personal experience of the stage, it is high time that women were protected against men of that sort and such conditions... What is glass...that we have broken as a political protest, and which can be replaced, compared to the bodies and souls of women…that vicious men have irretrievably broken and ruined for their own unrestrained lust?") throwing bricks through the windows of post offices; and hurling a package of suffragette literature through a window of the Home Office.

== Bombing, arson, and hunger strikes ==
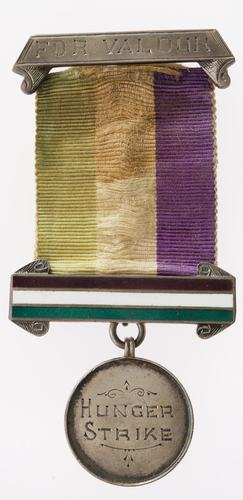
Hunger strike medal awarded to Marion in 1909 by the WSPU for engaging in hunger strikes

In 1912, under the leadership of Christabel Pankhurst, the WSPU's activism escalated from vandalism and riots to arson and bombing. The bomb and arson attacks were intended to attract attention, but not to harm people. (Note: Biographer Riddell suggests that the safety of innocent bystanders was not guaranteed, because most of Marion's bombs used timers, and she was not present at the time of detonation to ensure no people were nearby.) As a precaution to minimize injuries, some bombs smoked before they detonated, giving people time to escape.

One of the first arson attacks perpetrated by Marion occurred in April 1913, when she set fire to a home of Arthur du Cros, a Member of Parliament who had consistently voted against the enfranchisement of women. The most significant arson attack conducted by Marion was in the summer of 1913, when she and Clara Giveen exacted revenge for the death of fellow suffragette Emily Davison, who died while protesting for suffrage at a horse race track on 4 June 1913. Four days after Davison's death, Marion and Giveen responded by burning down the Hurst Park Race grandstand. Marion was sentenced to three years in prison for the crime. (Note: In 1913, the UK government passed the Cat and Mouse Act which prohibited the use of force-feeding to combat hunger strikes; instead, hunger strikers were kept in prison until they became extremely weak, at which point they would be temporarily released to recover. Due to the Cat and Mouse Act, Marion would serve only about four months in prison for this conviction.)

WSPU leaders employed Marion to carry out several bombings and arson attacks around Britain during 1914, including mansions in Lynton and Liverpool, as well as greenhouses in Liverpool's Sefton Park and Manchester's Alexandra Park.

While in prison, some suffragettes would go on hunger strike, leading prison staff to restrain them and insert tubes down their nostrils or mouth, then pour liquid food through the tube. Marion engaged in hunger strikes and the consequent force feedings during several imprisonments between 1909 and 1915. During a four-month imprisonment in Holloway prison in 1914 for arson, Marion was force-fed 232 times, sometimes three times a day. She remembered it to be "hellish torture", but the experience only increased her motivation. In 1909, Marion received the Hunger Strike Medal from the WSPU, awarded to suffragettes who went on hunger strikes while in prison.

By 1914, Marion was considered one of the primary militants of the suffrage movement: she was included in a list compiled by the British Criminal Record Office, along with Jennie Baines, Lillian Forrester, Clara Giveen, Lilian Lenton, Miriam Pratt and Mary Raleigh Richardson.

== World War I ==
On the outbreak of World War I in 1914, the leadership of WSPU adopted a patriotic stance and suspended their activism to support the national war effort. Marion returned to theater work and – fearing reprisals for her suffrage work – took on a new stage name: Kathleen Meredith.

Britain was at war with Germany, and under the Aliens Restriction Act of 1914 Marion was considered to be an enemy alien, which meant the UK government would almost certainly deport her. Marion applied to the government for permission to remain in the UK or – alternatively – to become a British subject. Her application was denied, despite many supportive letters submitted by her colleagues. Marion was forced to make a choice between returning to Germany, or immigrating to America. She had no interest in returning to Germany, so – with financial assistance from the influential suffragettes Constance Lytton and Emmeline Pethick-Lawrence – she boarded the steamship Cymric in October 1915 for passage from Liverpool to New York.

== Birth control movement in the US ==
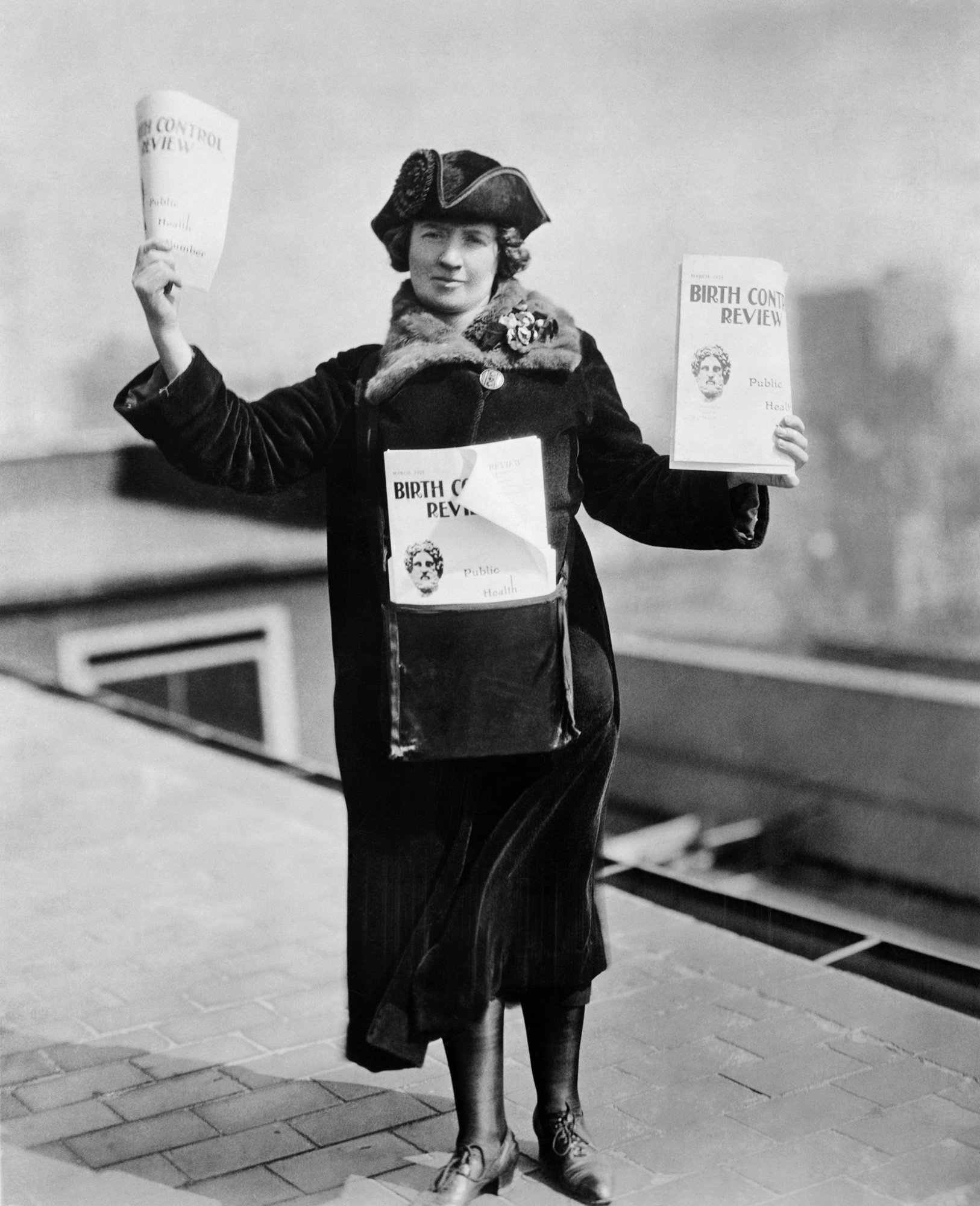
Kitty Marion sold copies of Birth Control Review on the streets of New York for 13 years. (Note: In this photo Marion is selling "Public Health Number". Birth Control Review. Vol. 9, no. 8. March 1925.)

When Marion arrived in the US, she was not entirely unknown: US newspapers had mentioned her by name during the years 1912 to 1914 when reporting on the UK suffrage movement. (Note: Marion is mentioned in dozens of US newspaper articles from 1912 to 1930.) Marion spent her first two years in New York unable to find work as an actress, because US talent agents were aware of her reputation for controversy in the UK. Instead, she worked as a dishwasher, and wrote a few small articles for newspapers.

In January 1917, Marion noticed an advertisement for an upcoming birth control rally at Carnegie Hall, organized by Margaret Sanger's organization, the American Birth Control League (ABCL). She contacted the ABCL and was surprised to discover that they were aware of Marion's activities in the suffrage movement. She accepted a job offer from the ABCL, selling copies of Sanger's monthly magazine, the Birth Control Review.

For the next thirteen years, Marion was a familiar figure in several New York neighborhoods, standing on street corners from Times Square to Coney Island, selling copies of the magazine. While selling, she advocated for birth control by engaging in conversation with passers-by. Marion continued to be occasionally mentioned in the New York press: in March 1917, she was described as an "English militant suffragette" in the Brooklyn Daily Eagle. (Note: The Brooklyn Daily Eagle article was about a supportive crowd greeting Margaret Sanger upon Sanger's release from prison: "Miss Kitty Marion, English militant suffragette ... enlivened the processing while Mrs Sanger's release was awaited by singing the suffragist version of 'La Marseillaise', underneath the jail windows. Miss Marion has a good mezzo soprano voice and the jail windows, especially on the upper floors where the women are confined, were thrown open. Applause was generous and hearty.")

Unlike Marion's suffragette years, her job as a street vendor did not include any violent activities, yet she was still arrested several times, usually for violating obscenity laws that prohibited distribution of birth control information. (Note: There were many anti-obscenity laws in effect at the time. The primary federal law was the Comstock Act, but New York also had similar state laws.) In November 1918, she spent thirty days in jail for selling a birth control pamphlet to a member of the New York Society for the Suppression of Vice. In jail she met Agnes Smedley, a political dissident. Smedley later remembered Marion coming down the hallway every morning shouting "Three cheers for birth control."

== Later life and death ==
Marion was not present in the UK when the Representation of the People Act 1918 was passed, which gave British women over the age 30 the right to vote under certain circumstances. (Note: The act extended the franchise in parliamentary elections, also known as the right to vote, to men aged over 21, whether or not they owned property, and to women aged over 30 who resided in the constituency whilst occupying land or premises with a rateable value above £5, or whose husbands did.) She reunited with many of her former suffrage colleagues in March 1930, when she briefly returned to England to see the unveiling of a statue of suffrage leader Emmeline Pankhurst.

After Sanger resigned as president of ABCL in 1928, the new president, Eleanor Jones, took steps to transition the ABCL from an era of confrontational activism to a new era of dignified professionalism. In January 1930, in the midst of the Great Depression, Jones notified Marion – then 58 years old – that street sales of the Birth Control Review would be discontinued, and Marion's services were no longer needed. The ABCL threw a luncheon for Marion, and gave her a severance payment of $500 (equivalent to $9,636 in 2025) to thank her for selling 100,000 copies of the magazine.

After departure from the ABCL, Marion found work at the Speech Improvement Project of the Works Progress Administration, where she helped children learn English, but by 1933, she was surviving on handouts from friends and former colleagues. In 1936, The New Yorker published an article titled "Where Are They Now? The Crusader" which provided an update on Marion to its readers.

Marion died in poverty at the Sanger Nursing Home in New York City on 9 October 1944. (Note: Sanger Nursing Home had no relation to Margaret Sanger.) Her will specified that she should be cremated, and that there should be no funeral or religious services. Several newspapers printed Marion's obituary, including the New York Herald Tribune; and tributes were sent from acquaintances in the UK, Australia, Jamaica, and across America. Marion earned her own living from the age of seventeen, and she never married. (Note: A government census document from 1940 shows a "Married" status for Marion, but it appears to be a mistake.)

== Autobiography and historiography ==
Encouraged by friends who were impressed with her prodigious memory and engaging storytelling ability, Marion spent the years from 1930 to 1933 writing her autobiography, but she was unable to find a publisher during her lifetime. (Note: Marion's autobiography, like similar accounts written by other British suffragette arsonists, omitted most details about her bombing and arson attacks.) (Note: Many suffragettes wrote memoirs after WWI, so publishers had a surfeit of writers from which to choose.) After her death in 1944, copies of the manuscript passed into the collections of museums that had a special interest in the suffrage movement. (Note: Marion's papers are collected in the New York Public Library, the Women's Library, and the London Museum.) The feminist scholar Fern Riddell used the manuscript as a source when writing the first full biography of Marion, published in 2018. Marion's autobiography was published in 2019, annotated by the academics Viv Gardner and Diane Atkinson.

Marion's contributions to the British suffrage movement were largely overlooked by 20th-century historians. Riddell traced the omission to the fact that most historians of the suffragette movement sanitized and distorted their own history by suppressing most references to arson and bombings, and over-stating the role of genteel lobbying. (Note: Riddell, building on earlier analysis from the historian Laura E. Nym Mayhall, writes: "As conservative feminism took a vice-like grip of our history and the suffragettes began to sanitise their own history, the women who saw sex, freedom and independence as a universal right were ignored, as were the real lives and experiences of the women who had fought so hard and risked so much.... Perhaps this is a reason for Kitty's absence from the historical record...") The driving force behind the suppression, according to Riddell, was the Suffragette Fellowship, a group of former suffragettes active from 1926 to 1950, who curated suffragette history and exerted control over museum exhibits and historical research. The Fellowship decided which women and events to highlight and which to ignore: they emphasized conservative figures and noble political goals, and de-emphasized working-class women and sexual issues. (Note: Riddell writes: "[The Suffragette Fellowship] ... 'created a highly stylised story' of the WSPU and the history of suffrage in England, which emphasized 'women's martyrdom and passivity'. It was this group who compiled documents, memoirs and memorabilia that now form the basis of the ... Collection held by the Museum of London.... the Fellowship decided what constituted appropriate suffrage history, and what stories should be reduced or left out.")
