= Olive Hockin =

British suffragette and painter (1881–1936)

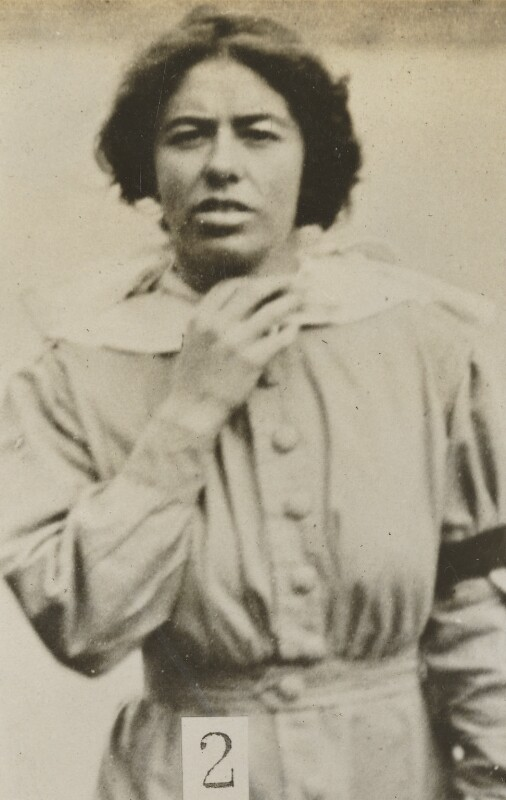
- Photograph created by the United Kingdom's Criminal Record Office
- Born: 1881
- Died: 1936 (aged 54–55)
- Education: Slade School of Fine Art
- Occupations: suffragette, arsonist, author and artist
- Spouse: John Leared (m. 1922)
- Children: 2

Olive Hockin (married name Olive Leared; 1881–1936) was a British suffragette, arsonist, author, artist and ski champion.

== Career ==
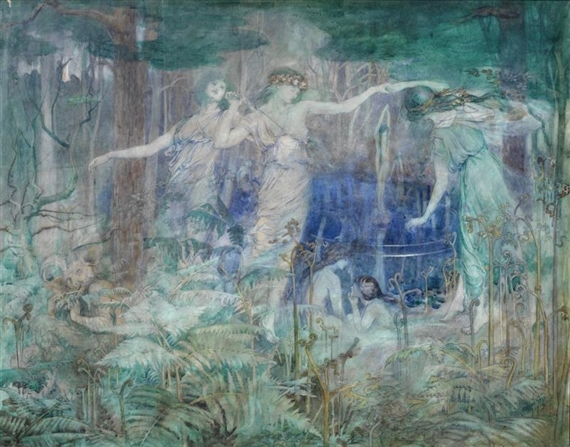
Pan! Pan! O Pan! Bring Back thy Reign Again Upon the Earth, 1914 by Olive Hockin

Between 1904 and 1911 Hockie studied at the Slade School of Fine Art. Her work was shown at the Royal Academy, by the Society of Women Artists and at the Walker Gallery.

== Activism ==
Hockin joined the suffragette movement and Women's Social and Political Union (WSPU) in 1912. In 1913, after arson attacks on the Roehampton Golf Club and on a house at Walton Heath belonging to Lloyd George, suspected to be suffragette-related, Hockin was arrested, convicted and handed a four-month sentence. Her flat was said to contain stones, kerosene and false car number plates. Hockin claimed she was not guilty of the charges and objected to the male dominated justice system, saying that: "a court composed entirely of men have no moral right to convict and sentence a woman, and until women have the power of voting I shall continue to defy the law, whether I am in prison or out of it." Once imprisoned, unusually she agreed not to go on hunger strike if she was allowed to paint. She was treated as a "Category One prisoner", and it was said by a fellow prisoner, Margaret Scott, that she carved the chair in her cell.

The National Portrait Gallery has a picture of her by the Criminal Record Office, and two pages of "Surveillance Photograph of Militant Suffragettes", also by the Criminal Record Office, which includes her. Her picture was taken from a concealed car in the prisoners' exercise yard using an 11 inch powerful lens which had been purchased by the Home Office. The secret pictures were required because the suffragettes would distort their faces when conventional mug shots were being taken. The Home Office was worried by the impact of their arson and vandal attacks and they were closing art galleries.

She was released from prison for the Roehampton action in time to win the British Ski Championship held in Switzerland in January 1914. She had entered the competition previously in 1911 achieving a 7-metre ski jump.

Hockin was a Land Girl during the Great War, and later wrote Two Girls on the Land: Wartime on a Dartmoor Farm, which was published in 1918.

In 1922 she married John Leared who trained polo ponies in Cheltenham. They had two sons. She died in 1936.
