= Margaret Scott (suffragette) =

Margaret Schenke
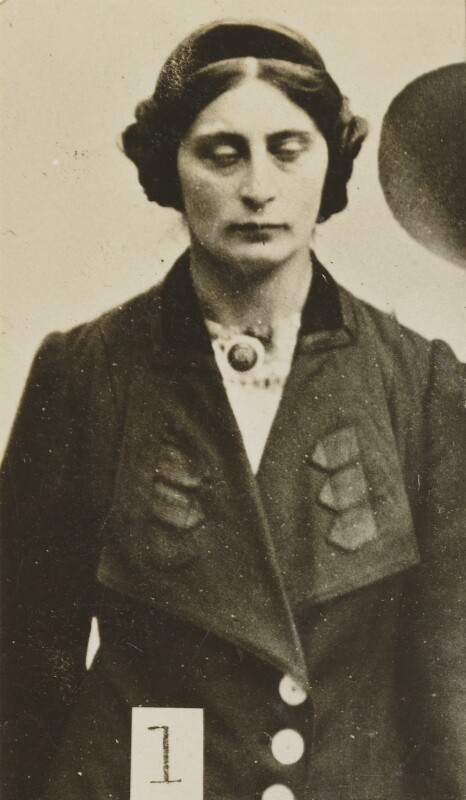
- Margaret Scott
- Born: Gretel Schenke; 1888; Zwickau, German Empire
- Died: 1983 (aged 94–95); London Borough of Ealing, England
- Other names: Margaret Scott
- Known for: Identified as militant suffragette
- Spouse: Richard Dixon
- Children: Barbara and Margaret

Gretel Schenke, Margaret Schenke or Margaret Scott (1888 – 1983) was a UK based suffragette who was born in Germany. She was arrested after two agent provocateurs encouraged her to break a window. The authorities secretly photographed her and identified her as a person who should be kept under surveillance.

== Life ==
Gretel Schenke was born in Zwickau in 1888. She resulted from her father's second marriage and a family row led to her emigrating to Britain with the name of Margot Schenke in about 1908. She took lodging in Chelsea and fell in with suffragettes and spent her time selling The Suffragette newspapers. She reported how the police saved her at Hyde Park Corner. Youths, who made her task difficult with sexual remarks became physical' seizing her banner and trying to seize her. She was grateful when two mounted policemen dispersed the youths and others escorted her away and placed her on a bus to go home.

The authorities were not so supportive when Schenke was demonstrating against Emmeline Pankhurst's arrest in 1913. She chatted to two other demonstrators and suggested that a stone should be thrown at the Home Office. These two strangers arranged for her to make a telephone call to explain that she may not be home on time. It turned out that the two strangers were agent provocateurs and they tipped off a detective who was ready to arrest her.

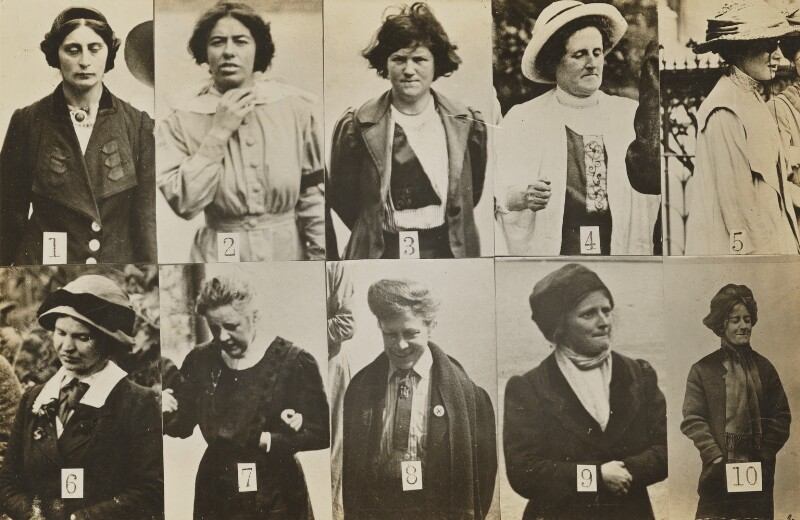
Margaret Scott is shown here on a police sheet of mugshots

Schenke was afraid that she might be deported so she gave her name as Margaret Scott and under this name she was sentenced to a month's imprisonment in Holloway Prison. In an unusual twist she was secretly photographed and she was the first picture on the first of two sheets of photographs that were distributed to police and art galleries to warn them of militant suffragettes. The pictures were taken from a concealed car during prisoners' exercise using an 11-inch powerful lens which had only recently been made in Britain. It was required because the suffragettes would distort their faces when conventional mug shots were being taken and the Home Office was worried by the impact of their arson and vandal attacks.

Schenke married Richard Dixon in July 1914 and supported the suffragettes until the outbreak of war. Emmeline and Christabel Pankhurst had declared a truce for their suffragettes and Schenke believed that the fight for the vote was more or less won. She did not mention this episode in her life until she saw, for the first time, her photograph in the Sunday Times. She reported that she considered herself as unimportant in the suffragette movement, although she had met Olive Hockin (Number 2), Margaret Macfarlane (Number 3) and Jane Short (Number 6). Her story became a source of pride to her descendants.

Schenke died in Ealing in 1983.
