= Jane Short =

British feminist and suffragette

Jane Short (also known as Rachel Peace; 1881–1964) was a British militant suffragette and member of the Women's Social and Political Union. Between 1911 and 1913 she was arrested on three occasions for window-smashing and once for arson. She was imprisoned four times in HM Prison Holloway, serving a total of nineteen months, the longest recorded term for a suffragette.

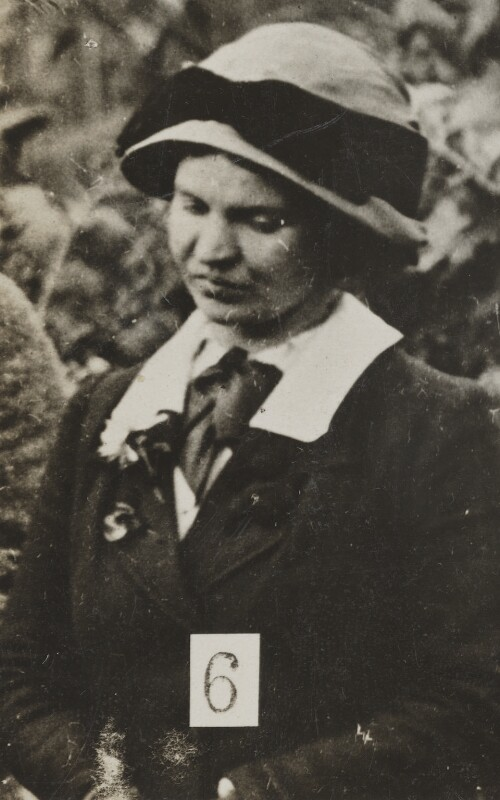
Jane Short (also known as Rachel Peace), Holloway Prison, 1913

== Early life ==
Jane was born Florence Jane Short on 25 April 1881 at 3 Lewis Grove, Catford, London. Her father, Samuel Short (1857-1924), was from Whitechapel and her mother, Mary (née Brown), was from Suffolk. Although Samuel was a manual worker for Lewisham Council Jane's three siblings entered middle-class professions. Jane worked as a shirt machinist and later as a self-employed embroideress and massage therapist. Her interests included astrology and Esperanto, and she expressed deep concern about the sexual and economic exploitation of working-class women.

By 1911 Short was living at 126 Wilbury Road, Letchworth Garden City. Her fellow lodger, Charles Purdom, was the town’s planner and a historian of the garden city movement. Her landlady, Kate Hayward, was the sister-in-law of the town’s founder Ebenezer Howard, president of the Letchworth branch of the Men's League for Women's Suffrage.

== Suffragette activity and convictions ==
=== First conviction (1911) ===
On 21 November 1911 Short took part in a coordinated window-smashing demonstration in central London in protest against the proposed Manhood Suffrage Bill. She was among 223 arrested. Charged at Bow Street Police Court with breaking windows at the War Office, she refused to pay a fine and was sentenced to seven days’ imprisonment.

=== Second conviction (1912) ===
On 11 July 1912 Short was arrested in Baldock after breaking post office windows. She was found carrying stones and personal items suitable for an overnight stay. At Hertford Quarter Sessions on 14 October 1912 she pleaded guilty and stated that her actions were intended to draw attention to the demand for votes for women. She refused to promise not to reoffend and was sentenced to three months’ imprisonment. She was the first suffragette to be placed in the First Division, reserved for political prisoners.

She served her full sentence, including spending Christmas 1912 in prison, and was released in January 1913.

=== Third conviction (1913) ===
On 1 February 1913 Short smashed plate glass windows at Hampton’s furniture shop near the National Gallery in London. At Bow Street Magistrates' Court she declared that she did not recognise the authority of the government or its laws. She was later sentenced at Clerkenwell Sessions to six months’ imprisonment in the Second Division.

During her imprisonment she went on hunger strike following the introduction of the Prisoners (Temporary Discharge for Ill Health) Act 1913. She was released early in July 1913.

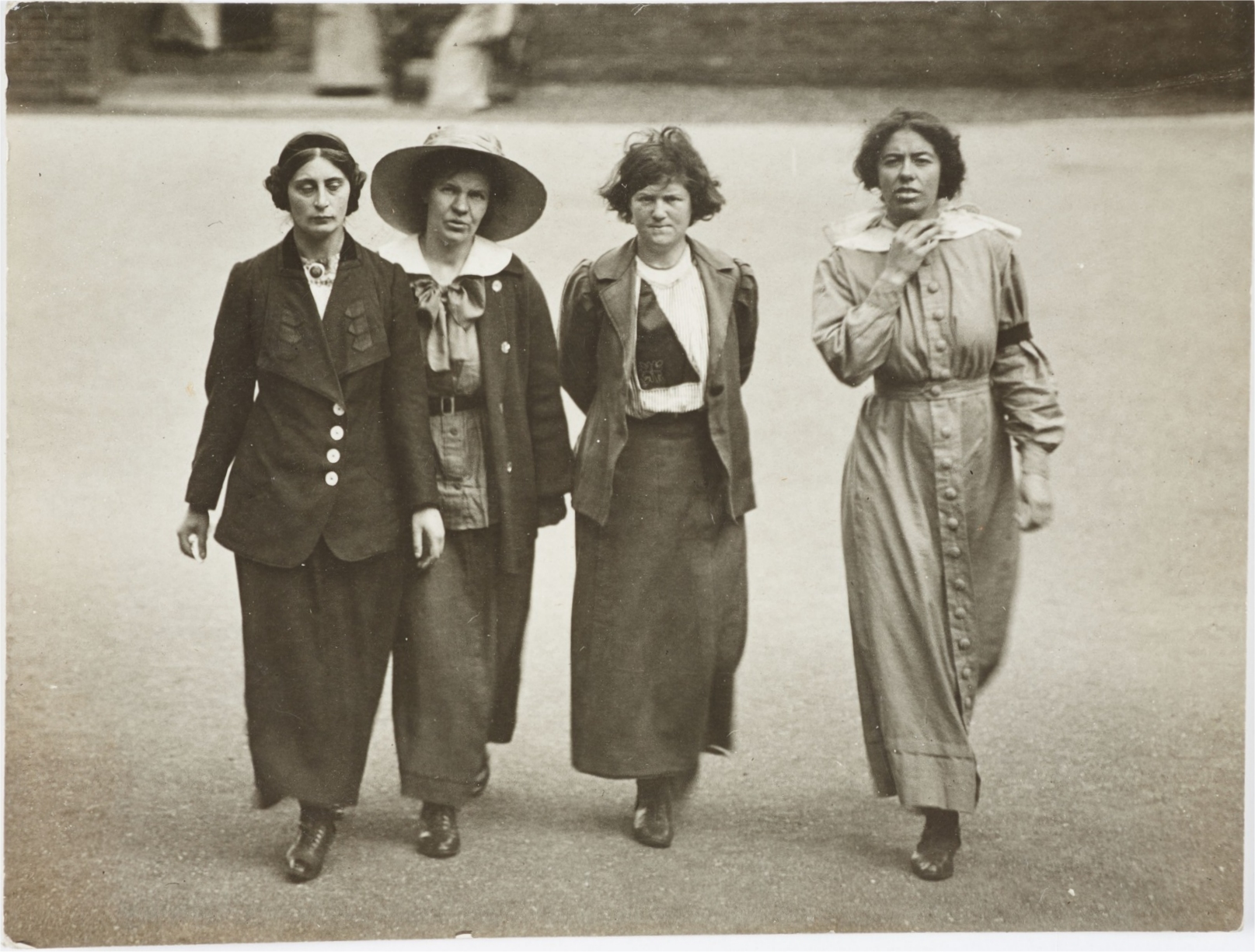
Jane Short (second from left) with fellow prisoners in HM Prison Holloway.

=== Fourth conviction: The Elms (1913) ===
On 4 October 1913 Short, using the alias “Rachel Peace”, and fellow suffragette Mary Richardson set fire to The Elms, an unoccupied mansion in Hampton-on-Thames most recently occupied by Dr Thomas Tristram and his daughter Flora Tristram, who was a militant suffragette. The building was destroyed. Evidence found at the scene included flammable materials and suffragette slogans.

The two women were arrested nearby shortly after the fire. Both were remanded in custody and went on hunger strike, during which they were forcibly fed. Jane Short and Mary Raleigh Richardson were the first suffragette prisoners to be force-fed whilst on remand and unconvicted.

Richardson was too ill to stand trial, so Short, as “Rachel Peace”, was tried alone at the Old Bailey on 15 November 1913. During the proceedings there were disturbances in the courtroom involving suffragette supporters. Four women were arrested, including Mary Ann Aldham. Short was convicted of arson and sentenced to eighteen months’ imprisonment with hard labour.

=== Final imprisonment and release ===
During her final incarceration in HM Prison Holloway, which lasted ten months, Short undertook further hunger strikes and was repeatedly force-fed, which caused a breakdown in her mental health. She kept her allies updated by releasing several statements to The Suffragette.

I am being forcibly fed three times a day now… I am afraid I shall be affected mentally. I feel as if I should go mad. I have had nervous breakdowns before and I now have the sensation of an impending crisis… I have frightful dreams and am struggling with mad people half the night.

In Holloway Short (as “RP”) and Kitty Marion used prison toilet paper to write secret notes to each other, which they also shared with Mary Richardson. The notes are currently held at the London Museum.

In January 1914 Short was interviewed in her cell by the Bishop of London, who afterwards produced a report on her welfare, which he found satisfactory. This was refuted by leading suffragettes, who claimed he had been hoodwinked by the authorities. The bishop’s visit was satirised in John Bull in February 1914.

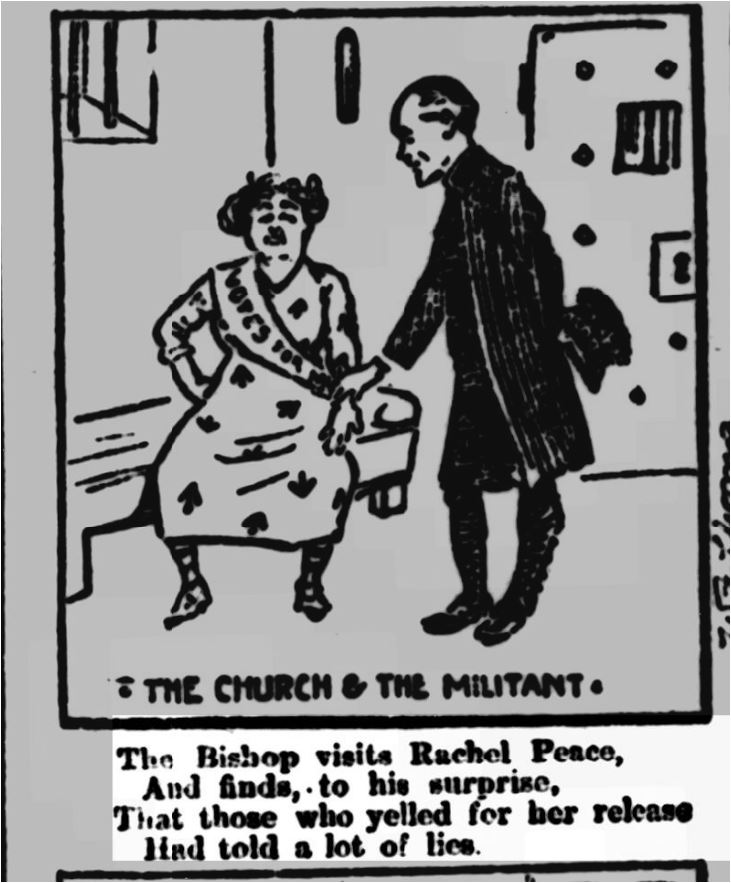
Cartoon from John Bull (7 February 1914) depicting "Rachel Peace" (Jane Short) in Holloway Prison.

In February 1914 MP Henry Chancellor questioned the Home Secretary Reginald McKenna about Short being treated differently from other prisoners, who were released after hunger striking. McKenna replied that Short’s case was different both because she was an arsonist and because she had refused to promise not to reoffend if released. This prompted Emmeline Pankhurst to write to the press challenging the authorities to force-feed her as well, since she had ‘incited’ Short to commit the arson.

At an unknown date, Short was awarded the WSPU Hunger Strike Medal for Valour, in the name “Rachel Peace”. It is currently in a private collection.

Her sentence was due to end in April 1915, but she was released in August 1914 under the general amnesty of suffragette prisoners at the outbreak of the First World War.

=== Later life ===
Following her release, Short’s mental health remained poor for the remainder of her life. Initially Constance Lytton paid for her care in a private asylum. By the 1921 United Kingdom census she was a patient in Buckinghamshire Mental Hospital, and in the 1939 Register she was listed at Wiltshire County Mental Hospital at Devizes.

Jane Short died in the institution, by then renamed Roundway Hospital, in August 1964, aged 83, and was buried in its grounds.

== See also ==
- Suffragette bombing and arson campaign
- List of suffragists and suffragettes
