= Hurst Park Racecourse =

Closed horse racing venue in England

Coordinates: 51.4096°N 0.3640°W

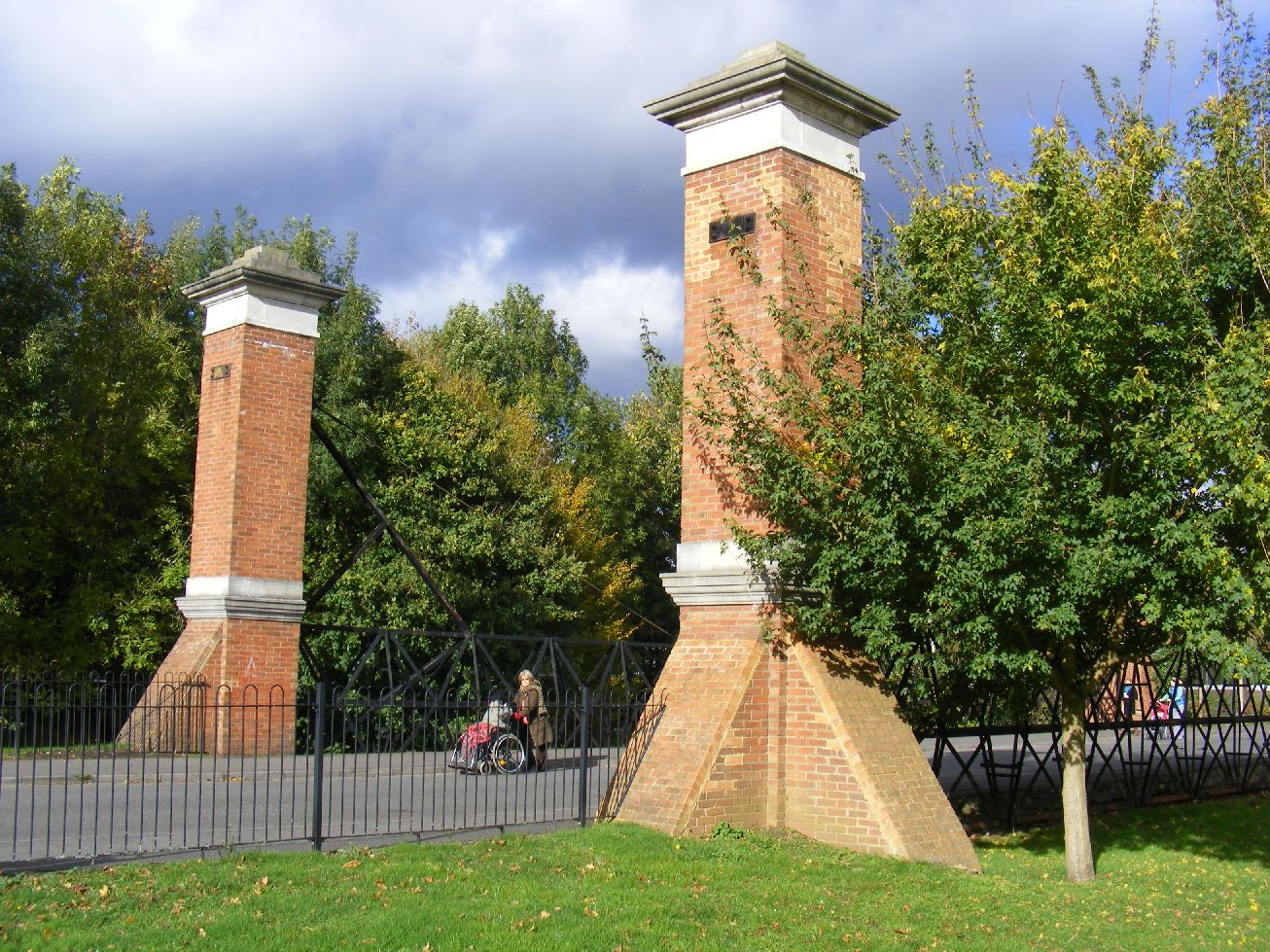
Brick piers at the entrance of the former Hurst Park racecourse, in 2012

Hurst Park Racecourse was a racecourse at Moulsey Hurst, West Molesey, Surrey, near the River Thames. It was first laid out in 1890 and held its last race in 1962.

There was racing at nearby Hampton for many years until 1887. The first meeting at Hurst Park was a jumping fixture on 19 March 1890. The opening race was the Hurst Park Cup, worth £199, over two miles. It was won by Mr. Dougall's Sir Benedict, who also rode it. The first flat meeting was held on 25 March 1891. The Inauguration Plate of £188, over six furlongs, was the first race; it was won by Ready, ridden by W. Wood.

The racecourse was the scene of an arson attack by Kitty Marion and Clara Elizabeth Giveen. The two suffragettes were establishing a revenge attack following the death of Emily Davison at the Derby in 1913.

Hurst Park's most notable flat race was the Victoria Cup, a handicap over seven furlongs, which transferred to Ascot after the closure of Hurst Park. The Triumph Hurdle, over two miles for four year olds, was run here from 1939 until the course closed. It was then run at the Cheltenham Festival in March. The last race to be held here was the Byfleet Stakes, the 4.30 on Wednesday 10 October 1962, was won by the 11/8 favourite Anassa. Mansfield Town F.C. bought one of the grandstands for later use as the West Stand at Field Mill and Ascot Racecourse purchased 20 acres of turf which was used to lay down Ascot's new National Hunt racing course.

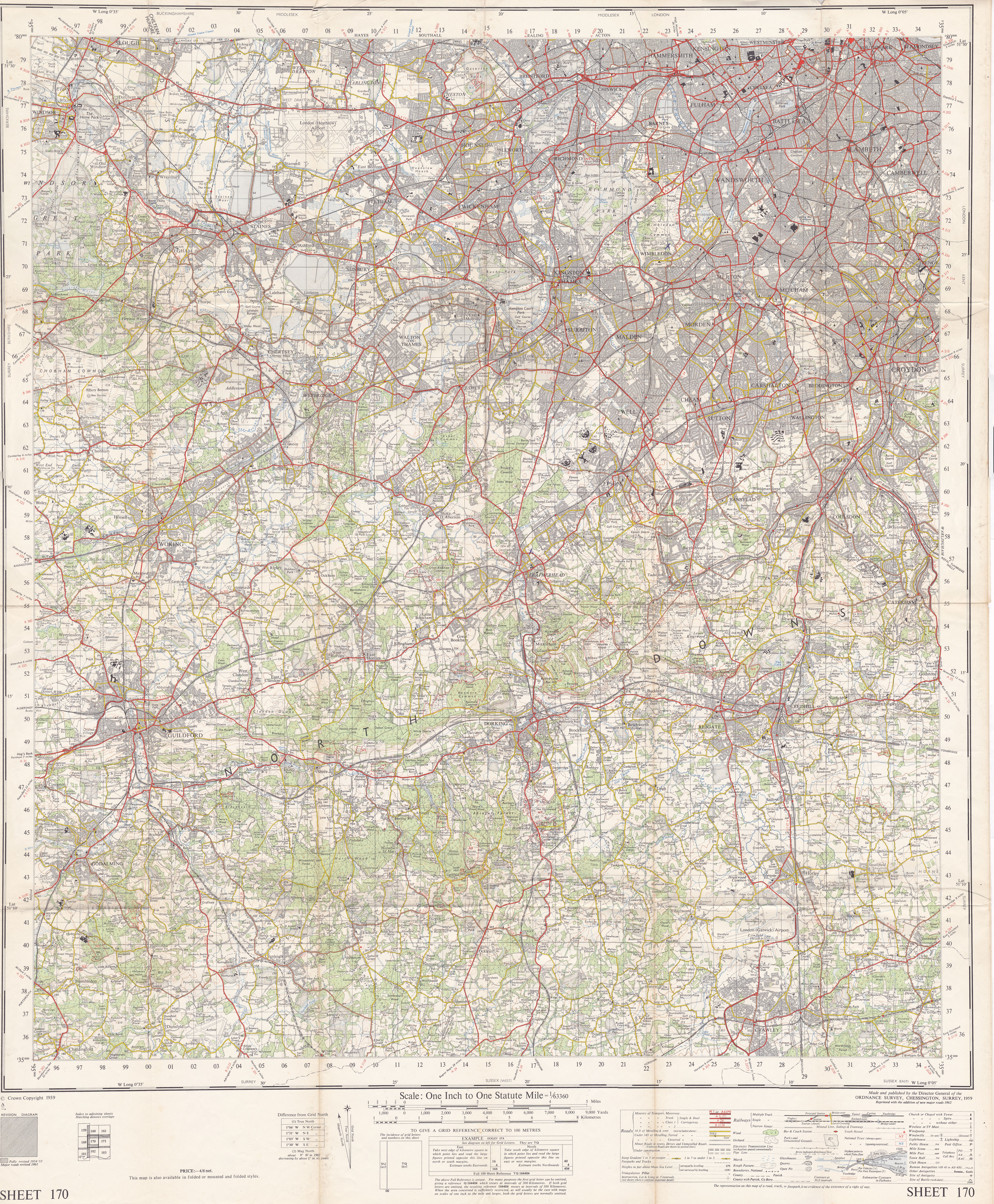
Hurst Park Racecourse in 1959: The red circle, top left, is Hampton station and St Paul's Church, Molesey, is bottom right.

Hurst Park was a right-handed oval of 1 mile 3 furlongs, with a home straight of about four furlongs. The five furlongs course was straight, but races over six and seven furlongs had a slight, left-handed elbow. The inner steeplechase course was sharp, with eight fences, five down the back straight, including the water jump, and three in the home straight.

On the outbreak of World War II, Royal Engineers companies of 1st London Division of the Territorial Army mobilised at Hurst Park Racecourse before proceeding to France to join the British Expeditionary Force. In October 1941 "A" Company of 70th Battalion The Middlesex Regiment (Duke of Cambridge's Own) moved into Hurst Park Racecourse for several months before moving to Hounslow Barracks with the rest of the Battalion.

Some of the racecourse was kept as public access to the riverside Hurst Park, with the remainder sold for the building of the present varied height residential housing in 1962. In the summer of 2018 the site of the course's pre-parade ring became temporarily visible due to the dry conditions caused by the 2018 British Isles heatwave.
