= Olive Beamish =

Irish born suffragette

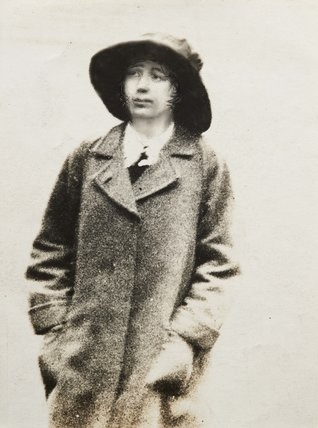
- Born: Agnes Olive Beamish; 17 June 1890; Cork, Ireland
- Died: 14 April 1978 (aged 87); Suffolk, England
- Education: Girton College, Cambridge
- Occupations: Suffragette and later typist agency business
- Organisation: Women's Social and Political Union
- Political party: Communist Party (1926-9) later Labour Party

Olive Beamish (17 June 1890 – 14 April 1978) was an Irish-born suffragette, women's rights campaigner, and trade unionist educated at Girton College Cambridge. Beamish wore a Women's Social and Political Union (WSPU) badge while still at school. Also known as "Phyllis Brady", Beamish became involved in the militant suffragette movement, including attacking postboxes and arson. Beamish was imprisoned and force-fed and was one of the first to be released under the "Cat and Mouse" Act. She was later sentenced to 18 months with hard labour. Beamish was fluent in six languages and was recognised by her movement with a medal for valour.

== Early life ==
Agnes Olive Beamish was born in Cork in Ireland. Her father was a Protestant farmer. Her parents supported their daughter joining Women's Social and Political Union (WSPU) in 1906 and she wore their badge to school, whilst living in Westbury-on-Trym, near Bristol, England, where they were had moved to by 1901. Beamish felt the inferior status of women when her brothers were able to engage in politics for the 1905 election, saying "I felt the position keenly, that I would never be equal to them in the political world, and I also realised the inferior position of women, everywhere." Beamish graduated from Girton College Cambridge and then worked for the Women’s Social and Political Union (WSPU).

== Suffrage activism ==
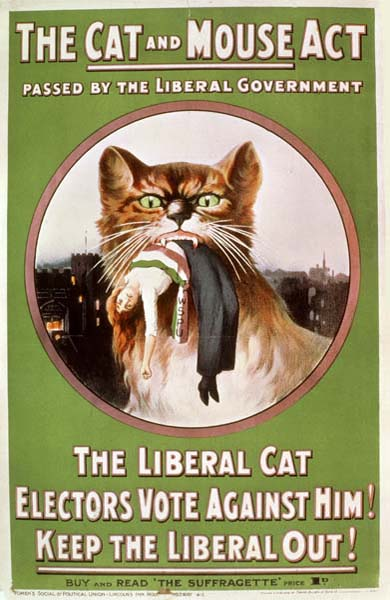
'Cat and Mouse Act' poster by the Women's Social and Political Union

Beamish began to organise for the WSPU at Battersea London as well as in the East End where she attacked a pillarbox. On 19 March 1913, Trevethan, a mansion house in Egham, Surrey (whose owner Lady White was out of the country) was ruined in an arson attack and fire, and messages were found in the garden referring to suffragette slogans, including "Stop torturing our comrades in prison" and "Votes for Women".

Beamish was said by a local policeman to be one of two women cycling very fast, without lights, at one a.m. She was identified under the pseudonym 'Phyllis Brady'. Less than a month later, she was setting fire to Sanderstead station but she was not caught. "Phyllis Brady" (i.e. Beamish was with Elsie Duval when both were arrested in Mitcham, with paraffin and other inflammables in suitcases. Beamish was sentenced to six weeks in Holloway prison.

Beamish went on hunger strike and she was force fed. She and Elsie Duval were the first to be released on 28 April 1913 under the Prisoners (Temporary Discharge for Ill Health) Act 1913, which became known as the 'Cat and Mouse' Act. This allowed prisoners who may be at risk of dying from hunger strike to be released on licence to recover and they would then be re-arrested to complete their sentence. Beamish went to the Regents Park area of London and continued militant activities. The WSPU HQ was asked about the whereabouts of the three released under the Act by the Daily Mirror. A WSPU spokeswoman talked about the cat being away and the mice able to play, and she explained their intention to make this Act as "ridiculous as anything the Government has done to frustrate our movement". She threatened that the suffragettes had plans "of which they little dream."

Dr Flora Murray wrote to the Glasgow Herald that she had carried out urine tests on Kitty Marion and Beamish during their hunger strike, and found high levels of a hypnotic drug bromide which was used as a muscle relaxant (to prevent vomiting during force feeding) which the doctor said "could only be harmful", and that as Beamish was preparing her defence for the trial, she may have tried to obtain an emetic to make herself vomit the hypnotic drugs.

A surveillance image of Olive Beamish (Phyllis Brady), taken in Holloway prison in 1913, is in the London Museum archive.

== Later life ==
During the First World War, Beamish was a social organiser based in Hoxton. She then ran her own typing agency business and was the vice president of the Association of Women Clerks and Secretaries. In 1928, Beamish spoke at an open meeting of the Women's Freedom League, arguing that the political enfranchisement of women would help to improve working conditions for women clerks. (The Offices Regulation Bill proposed to improve working conditions had failed to progress in parliament.) Beamish was active in the trade union movement for more than 50 years and was a member of the Sudbury and Woodbridge Labour Party when she retired.

Beamish was a member of the Communist Party from 1926-29, later joining the Labour Party and becoming Secretary of the Chelmsford Labour Party. Beamish supported the Republican faction in the Spanish Civil War. In 1926, Beamish was living in Billericay, Essex and then moved to Suffolk.

Beamish died in Stowmarket in 1978, aged 87.
