= Cynthia Radding =

American historian

Cynthia Radding is an American historian and specialist in Latin American studies; since 2008, she has held the Gussenhoven Distinguished Professorship of Latin American Studies at the University of North Carolina at Chapel Hill.

== Biography ==
Cynthia Radding graduated from Smith College with a Bachelor of Arts degree (BA) in 1968, majoring in history. She then completed a Master of Arts degree (MA) at the University of California, Berkeley, in 1970. From 1973 to 1990, she was a Research Historian at the Instituto Nacional de Antropología e Historia in Mexico; in 1990, she was awarded her doctorate (PhD) in history from the University of California, San Diego. She then joined the University of Missouri–St. Louis as an Assistant Professor and in 1995 moved to an equivalent post at the University of Illinois at Urbana–Champaign; she became an Associate Professor there in 1999 and served as Acting Director of the University's Centre of Latin American and Caribbean Studies for the year 1999–2000. From 2004 to 2008, she was Professor of History at the University of New Mexico, where she was also Director of its Latin American and Iberian Institute (2004–07). She joined the University of North Carolina at Chapel Hill in 2008 as Gussenhoven Distinguished Professor of Latin American Studies and Professor of History, where she remained until 2024.

== Research ==
According to the University of North Carolina at Chapel Hill's research profile, Radding's research on "Latin American colonial history focus on the intersections between environmental and ethnographic history"; she is particular interested in the imperial borderlands of the Spanish and Portuguese American empires and the way that indigenous people shaped society there. Her published works include Borderlands in World History, 1700-1914 (London and New York: Palgrave MacMillan, 2014), which she co-edited with Paul Readman and Chad Bryant, and Landscapes of Power and Identity: Comparative Histories in the Sonoran Desert and the Forests of Amazonia from Colony to Republic (Duke University Press, 2005).

In his review of Landscapes of Power and Identity for The Hispanic American Historical Review, David Block argues that "By narrating the interrelationship between humans and their natural surroundings, [Radding] challenges her readers to examine our understanding of the different ways that new societies formed on American frontiers and of the nature of boundaries themselves" and states that her "most important contribution ... is her thoughtful commentary on the nature of boundaries". In Ethnography, Barbara A. Sommer wrote that the book offered a "sweeping, conceptually driven analysis of Sonora and Chiquitos" which "extend[s] ethnohistory to the Ibero-American periphery and reconfigure[s] the concept of frontier", while her "bold comparative approach" is her "most salient contribution to the historiography". In The International Review of History, Stuart McCook reiterated this point, arguing that Radding "weaves the stories of these borderlands together to develop an innovative comparative study". He goes on to state that the book is "a superb example of how to incorporate the natural world into more traditional historical themes. It moves beyond the now-standard historical narratives of environmental decline in colonial Latin America to offer a more complex and nuanced picture of the interplay between nature and society in the late colonial and early national periods".
