= Clara Giveen =

Northern Ireland suffragette and arsonist

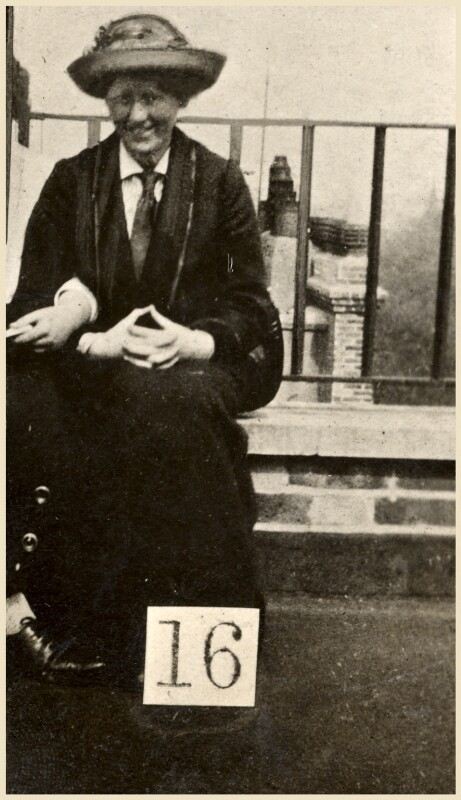
United Kingdom's Criminal Record Office image of Clara Elizabeth Giveen

Clara Elizabeth Giveen, also known as Betty Giveen, later Mrs Betty Brewster (1887–1967) was a British suffragette. She was known for an arson attack on the grandstand at the Hurst Park Racecourse in 1913, and for her "cat and mouse" imprisonment.

== Biography ==
Giveen was born in 1887 in Coleraine, County Londonderry, Ireland. According to her National Portrait Gallery biography, she was radicalised by witnessing the brutal treatment of women at the hands of the police at the 1910 Black Friday demonstration outside the Palace of Westminster, and joined the Women's Social and Political Union (WSPU).

She took part in a number of WSPU actions, including a 1910 demonstration in Downing Street where she was arrested for obstruction but not charged. She was arrested again on 21 November 1911 and imprisoned for five days for breaking windows at a local government board office. She was once again arrested and imprisoned, this time for four months, along with Violet Aitken, for window-breaking at Jay's store in Regent Street on 1 March 1912.

On 8 June 1913, with actress and activist Kitty Marion, she mounted an arson attack on the grandstand of Hurst Park Racecourse causing (variously) £7,000 or £12,000 of damage. This was four days after the death of Emily Davison at Epsom Downs Racecourse. The pair were arrested the following day and subsequently imprisoned for three years with hard labour. Like many imprisoned suffragettes, she refused food and was eventually released under the terms of the Prisoners (Temporary Discharge for Ill Health) Act 1913. According to the Women's Suffrage Project, she thereafter evaded re-arrest.

Giveen was awarded a Hunger Strike Medal "for Valour" by WSPU.

In 1914, she married Philip Brewster, brother of suffragette Bertha Brewster. She was later active in Peaslake Women's Institute.
