= Arthur Burns (historian) =

British historian (1963–2023)

Arthur Burns (7 February 1963 – 3 October 2023) was a British historian who was Professor of Modern British History at King's College London.

== Early life and education ==
Arthur Burns was born in Barnard Castle, County Durham on 7 February 1963. He was educated at Ludlow College (1974–1981) and then read modern history at Balliol College, Oxford. He received a BA in 1984, later promoted to MA in 1989. He was awarded a DPhil by Oxford in 1990 for a thesis entitled The Diocesan Revival in the Church of England c.1825-1865.

== Academic career ==
Burns was appointed a lecturer in history at King's College London in 1992. He was promoted to senior lecturer in 2002 and to Professor of Modern British History in 2005. He was head of the Department of History from 2004 to 2008 and Vice-Dean for Education, Faculty of Arts and Humanities from 2014 to 2017.

Burns specialised in the history of English religion since the mid-eighteenth century, and particularly the history of the Church of England. Burns co-founded and co-edited the Boydell and Brewer monograph series Studies in Modern British Religious History. He was a fellow of the Royal Historical Society, and from 2012 to 2016 was its Vice President (Education), overseeing policy on the teaching of History in both schools and universities; he previously served as one of its Literary Directors. In 2015 he was awarded an honorary fellowship of the Historical Association, in 2016 he was appointed President of the Church of England Record Society, and in 2017 he was appointed academic director of the Georgian Papers Programme at King's.

== Death ==
Burns died from cancer on 3 October 2023, at the age of 60.

== Selected publications ==
- The Diocesan Revival in the Church of England, c. 1800–1870 (Oxford University Press, 1999).
- (Edited with Joanna Innes) Rethinking the Age of Reform: Britain, 1780–1850 (Cambridge University Press, 2003).
- (Edited with Derek Keene and Andrew Saint) St Paul’s: The Cathedral Church of London, 604–2004 (Yale University Press, 2004; awarded 2004 Berger prize for British Art History).
- "Beyond the 'Red Vicar': Christian Socialism and Community in Thaxted, Essex, c. 1910–84", History Workshop Journal (2013).
- (Edited with Paul Readman and Chad Bryant) Walking Histories 1800–1914 (Basingstoke: Palgrave Macmillan, 2016).
