= Paul Readman =

Historian

Paul Andrew Readman, FRHistS, is a political and cultural historian. He is Professor in Modern British History at King's College London, where he was Head of the History Department (2008–12) and also served as Vice-Dean for Research (2014–18) and Head of the School of Cultures (2019–23). As of 2025, he is again Head of the History Department.

== Biography ==
Paul Readman was educated at Newpark Comprehensive School in County Dublin, Ireland, before attending Christ's College, Cambridge, where he earned a Bachelor of Arts (BA), Master of Philosophy (MPhil), and Doctor of Philosophy (PhD). He was awarded his doctorate in 2002 for a thesis entitled "The role of land and landscape in English cultural and political debate, c. 1880–1910". From 1999 to 2002, Readman was a Research Fellow at Christ's College, Cambridge.

In 2002, he joined King's College London as a lecturer and, as of 2018, is Professor in Modern British History. He is a Fellow of the Royal Historical Society and currently serves as co-editor of the Transactions of the Royal Historical Society.

== Research ==
Readman's research focuses on the cultural and political history of modern Britain; he specialises in British electoral politics from the 1860s to the 1940s, the history of British landscape preservation, the 'Land Question' in British politics, and patriotism and national identities in Britain. His published works include:

- (edited with Geraint Thomas), Culture, Thought and Belief in British Political Life since 1800 (Boydell, 2024)
- (edited with Angela Bartie, Mark Freeman and others), Restaging the Past: Historical Pageants, Culture and Society in Modern Britain (UCL Press, 2020)
- Storied Ground: Landscape and the Shaping of English National Identity (Cambridge, 2018; paperback 2026)
- (edited with Arthur Burns and Chad Bryant) Walking Histories 1800–1914 (Basingstoke: Palgrave Macmillan, 2016).
- "William Cecil Slingsby, Norway, and British Mountaineering 1872–1914", The English Historical Review, vol. 129, no. 540 (2014), pp. 1098–1128.
- (edited with Cynthia Radding and Chad Bryant) Borderlands in World History, 1700–1914 (Basingstoke: Palgrave Macmillan, 2014).
- (edited with Thomas Otte) By-elections in British Politics 1832–1914 (Boydell Press, 2013).
- (edited with Matthew Cragoe) The Land Question in Britain, 1750–1950 (Basingstoke: Palgrave Macmillan, 2010).
- "The State of Twentieth-Century British Political History", Journal of Policy History, vol. 21, no. 3 (2009), pp. 219–238.
- "Jesse Collings and Land Reform, 1886–1914", Historical Research, vol. 81, no. 212 (2008), pp. 292–314.
- "Preserving the English Landscape, c. 1870–1914", Cultural and Social History, vol. 5, no. 2 (2008), pp. 197–218.
- "Conservatives and the Politics of Land: Lord Winchilsea's National Agricultural Union, 1893–1901", The English Historical Review, vol. 121, no. 490 (2006), pp. 25–69.
- "The Place of the Past in English Culture, c. 1890–1914", Past and Present, vol. 186, no. 1 (2005), pp. 147–199.
- "The Conservative Party, Patriotism, and British Politics: The Case of the General Election of 1900", Journal of British Studies, vol. 40, no. 1 (2001), pp. 107–145.
- "Landscape Preservation, 'Advertising Disfigurement' and English National Identity, c. 1890–1914", Rural History: Economy, Society, Culture, vol. 12, no. 1 (2001), pp. 61–83.
- "The Liberal Party and Patriotism in Early Twentieth Century Britain", Twentieth Century British History, vol. 12, no. 3 (2001), pp. 269–302.
- "The 1895 General Election and Political Change in Late Victorian Britain", Historical Journal, vol. 42, no. 2 (1999), pp. 467–493.

== Reviews of his published works ==
Walking Histories 1800–1914

- William Whyte for The English Historical Review, vol. 132, no. 556 (2017), pp. 736–737.
- Peter Borsay for Social History, vol. 42, no. 3 (2017), pp. 439–440

Borderlands in World History, 1700–1914

- Martin Klatt for Journal of Borderlands Studies, vol. 32, no. 3 (2017), pp. 413–414.

By-elections in British Politics 1832–1914

- Ben Weinstein for Journal of British Studies, vol. 53, no. 1 (2014), pp. 254–255.
- James Owen for Parliamentary History, vol. 34, no. 2 (2014), p. 272.
- Alun Wyburn-Powell for Parliamentary Affairs, vol. 68, no. 3 (2015), pp. 641–645.

The Land Question in Britain, 1750–1950

- John Martin for The English Historical Review vol. CXXVI, no. 520 (2011), pp. 731–732.
- Frederick S. Milton for Journal of Victorian Culture, vol. 17, no. 2 (2012), pp. 247–250.
- R. W. Hoyle for Cultural and Social History, vol. 9, no. 4 (2012), pp. 613–614.
- Nigel Goose for Victorian Studies, vol. 53, no. 4 (2011), pp. 742–744.
- Nadine Vivier for Revue d'histoire moderne et contemporaine vol.63, no. 4 (2016), pp. 228–231.
- Edward Royle for History, vol. 96, no. 321 (2011), pp. 111–113.
- David Martin for Parliamentary History, vol. 30, no. 2 (2011), pp. 263–264.
