= Lillian Forrester =

British suffragette

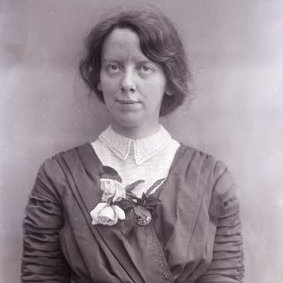
- by Linley Blathwayt
- Born: Lillian Williamson; 1879
- Died: 1973
- Known for: Militant suffragette
- Height: 5 ft 3.5 in (161 cm)

Lillian Forrester (née Williamson; 1879–1973) was a British suffragette who led an attack on paintings at Manchester Art Gallery.

== Life ==
She was born Lillian Williamson in 1879, and was the second daughter of Arthur Williamson, a commercial clerk, and Elizabeth Hall. She attended Owen's College, which later became Victoria University of Manchester. She had a degree in history.

Forrester joined the Women's Social and Political Union (WSPU) and served as secretary of the Manchester branch. In 1911 Forrester was invited to Eagle House near Bath by Linley Blathwayt and Emily Blathwayt. The Blathwayts invited leading suffragettes to visit their house. They created over 40 memorial trees to celebrate these visits in what was known as "Annie's Arbour."

Forrester led an attack on the Manchester Art Gallery on 3 April 1913 against the imprisonment and ill treatment of Emmeline Pankhurst. She, Evelyn Manesta and Annie Briggs waited until the gallery was closing and then proceeded to break the glass on many of the most valuable paintings in gallery 5. The three attacked the glass of thirteen paintings including two by John Everett Millais and two by George Frederick Watts. Staff were alerted by the sound of broken glass and the three were apprehended. Four of the paintings had been damaged by the broken glass. They were bailed to appear before magistrates the next day.

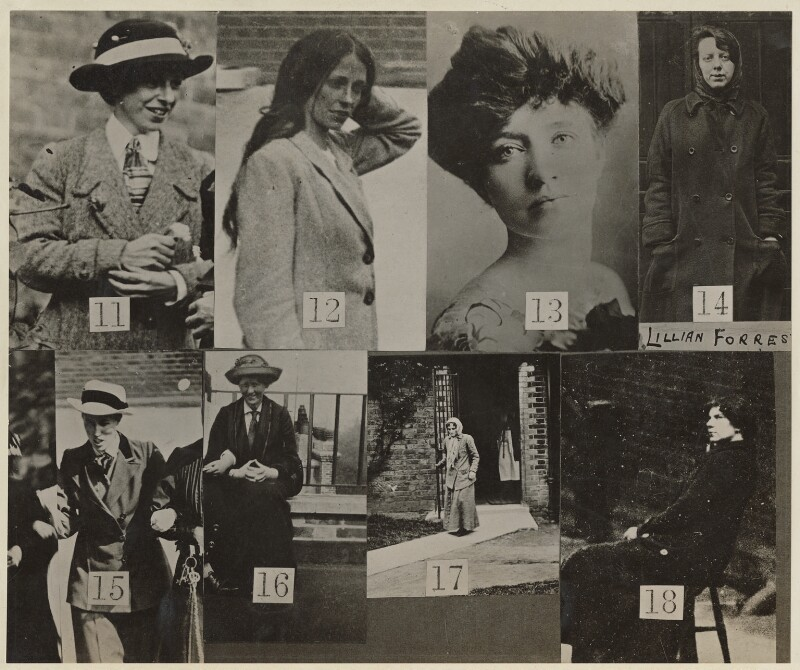
Militant suffragettes as secretly identified by the Criminal Record Office (See No. 14)

When on trial, Briggs persuaded the court that she had been present but had not been involved and was acquitted. Manesta was given a sentence of a month. Forrester was married by the time of her arrest, and told the jury that her husband approved of what she did. As she had a previous conviction, her sentence was three months in the second division cells at Strangeways Prison for malicious damage.

While Forrester was imprisoned she and Manesta were secretly photographed hiding in a van as the women took exercise in the yard and pictures of them were circulated with pictures of other militant suffragettes to police and art gallery staff. Manesta's photograph was modified to hide that she was being held around the neck whilst the photograph was taken.

After the Manchester branch of the WSPU was disbanded, Forrester joined the United Suffragists.

== Paintings involved in attack ==
- The Last Watch of Hero and Captive Andromache by Lord Frederic Leighton
- The Last of the Garrison by Briton Riviere
- Birnam Woods by John Everett Millais
- The Prayer and Portrait of The Hon J L Motley by George Frederick Watts
- A Flood by John Everett Millais
- When Apples were Golden by John Melhuish Strudwick
- The Shadow of Death by William Holman Hunt
- Astarte Syriaca by Dante Gabriel Rossetti
- Sybilla Delphica by Edward Burne-Jones
- Paola and Francesca by George Frederick Watts
- The Syrinx by Arthur Hacker
