= Mary Richardson =

Canadian suffragette (1882–1961)

Mary Raleigh Richardson
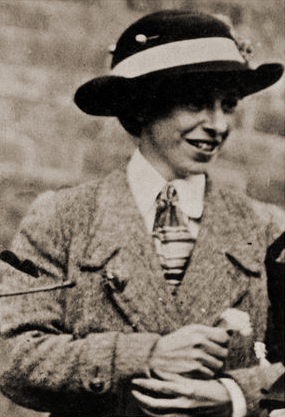
- by Special Branch c. 1914
- Born: 24 July 1882; Montreal
- Died: 7 November 1961; Hastings, East Sussex, England
- Occupation: Suffragette
- Known for: Slashing the Rokeby Venus

Mary Raleigh Richardson (24 July 1882 – 7 November 1961) was a Canadian-born suffragette active in the women's suffrage movement in the United Kingdom, an arsonist, a Labour parliamentary candidate and briefly an administrator in the women's section of the British Union of Fascists (BUF) led by Sir Oswald Mosley. She is best known for her militant work within the British feminist movement and for her use of new and radical protest methods which were regarded as controversial.

== 1882–1912 ==
Born in Montreal, she grew up in Belleville, Ontario, Canada. A great-granddaughter of Nahum Mower of The Kingston Gazette, she enjoyed inherited wealth which supported her until the 1940s. She studied at The Royal Conservatory of Music (then the Toronto Conservatory). She travelled extensively in Europe and Egypt as a young woman, spending a few months in England in 1907. She returned to Canada, then moved to London permanently about 1912.

== 1913–1914 ==
At the beginning of the 20th century, the British suffragette movement, frustrated by a failure to achieve equal voting rights for women, began adopting increasingly militant tactics. In particular, the Women's Social and Political Union (WSPU), led by Emmeline Pankhurst, frequently endorsed the use of property destruction to bring attention to the issue of women's suffrage.

Richardson was a member of the WSPU, and a devoted supporter of Mrs Pankhurst. She smashed windows at the Home Office and burned down The Elms, a historic mansion in Hampton, with her accomplice, Jane Short. She also committed the most sensational deed of the militant campaign: slashing the Rokeby Venus, a priceless painting. She was arrested nine times, receiving prison terms totalling more than three years.

Whilst imprisoned, she was force-fed for hunger-striking, and was one of the first two women to be force-fed after the introduction of the 1913 Cat and Mouse Act, Prisoners (Temporary Discharge for Ill Health) Act 1913, serving her sentences in HM Prison Holloway. Richardson was given the Hunger Strike Medal 'for Valour' by WSPU, and was proud of being awarded more bars for strikes than anyone else.

After one of her many hunger strikes Richardson recovered at the cottage of Lillian Dove-Willcox in the Wye valley. She was devoted to Dove-Willcox and wrote the poem The Translation of the Love I Bear Lillian Dove.

=== Damaging the Rokeby Venus ===
On 10 March 1914 Richardson entered the National Gallery in London to attack a painting by Velázquez, the Rokeby Venus, using a chopper she smuggled into the gallery.She wrote a brief statement explaining her actions to the WSPU which was published by the press:

I have tried to destroy the picture of the most beautiful woman in mythological history as a protest against the Government for destroying Mrs Pankhurst, who is the most beautiful character in modern history. Justice is an element of beauty as much as colour and outline on canvas.

— "Miss Richardson's Statement". The Times. London. 11 March 1914.

The canvas was later fully restored.

== After 1914 ==
Richardson was on the far Left, anti-war and a committed Christian.

During the First World War she worked with Sylvia Pankhurst in the East End and joined the Labour Party about 1918. She later joined the ILP. In the 1920s she stood as a Labour candidate three times. She described herself as "Red, not pink".

In 1933, after unsuccessful attempts to secure a winnable constituency with the Labour Party, Richardson transferred to the New Party, which was anti-war, socialist, and promoted equal opportunities for women. The party was led by Sir Oswald Mosley, who had recently been a Labour MP, as was his first wife, Lady Cynthia Mosley. The New Party later became the British Union of Fascists.

Richardson joined in an administrative role as assistant to Lady Esther Makgill, the organising secretary of the women's section within the London headquarters, which was headed by Maud, Lady Mosley, who was Oswald's mother. When Lady Makgill was suspended for "financial irregularities," Richardson assumed her responsibilities. She trained female members in public speaking and addressed several meetings in smaller venues. In July 1934, she was appointed propaganda officer in the women's section, a role she shared with Marjorie Aitken.

Increasingly dismayed at the BUF's policy of keeping women in subordinate positions, paying them less, and restricting their participation in rallies or office, Richardson called a meeting of female members at her Chelsea flat, for which Mosley quickly expelled her. Her involvement was brief, and her departure was not noted in the BUF newsletter.

From 1934 until the end of her life, Richardson was active in socialist and peace organisations. In the 1950s she attempted to found Redeemism, which called for world peace, but failed to get it off the ground.

Richardson published two novels, The Greater Waterloo (1905) and Matilda and Marcus (1915), and self-published three volumes of poetry, Symbol Songs (1916), Wilderness Love Songs (1917), and Cornish Headlands (1920). She also wrote a few articles for suffrage publications. Contrary to claims, she did not work as a journalist or an artist.

Richardson was a lesbian. All her love poems are about women.

In 1930 she unofficially adopted a baby she named Roger Richardson. A devoted mother, she raised him in rural Cambridgeshire. After he married in 1955, Richardson, then aged 73, moved into a tiny flat in Hastings, East Sussex.

Richardson published an autobiographical work, Laugh a Defiance, in 1953. It comprises a collection of anecdotes from her highly eventful year as a suffragette 1913–1914. According to her biographer, none of the stories is entirely true and some are completely fictitious.

Some of the events at which she is widely reported as being present, or committing, have been demonstrated to be untrue, for example her Epsom Derby story, and her anecdote about bombing a railway station.

Aged 79, she died at her flat in St James's Road, Hastings on 7 November 1961. After she was cremated, Roger took her ashes to his London home. Eventually Roger sold her Hunger Strike Medal at auction. Its whereabouts are currently unknown.

== See also ==
- Suffragette bombing and arson campaign
- List of suffragists and suffragettes

== Sources ==
- Wojtczak, Helena (2025). Mary Raleigh Richardson: The Suffragette Arsonist Who Slashed the Rokeby Venus. Hastings Press. ISBN 978-1-904109-60-0.
