= National Identification Service =

The National Identification Service (NIS; also called SO4 from its Specialist Operations designation) is a department of the London Metropolitan Police which provides a range of support services on behalf of the Metropolitan Police and other police forces. Its forerunner was the Habitual Criminals Register set up in 1869 by Commissioner Edmund Henderson, renamed the Criminal Record Office in 1871.

All SO4's services are connected with criminal records and include a remit to act as the National Identification Service (NIS). The Metropolitan Police has had a national role in keeping criminal records since the 18th century but it was not until 1913 that the Criminal Record Office was established at New Scotland Yard. The NIS had sole responsibility for maintaining the national database of criminal records until 1995 but, since then, each police force in England and Wales has been responsible for updating its own records on the Police National Computer. The NIS continues to provide a number of centralised maintenance and disclosure services for police forces.

SO4 also conducts background checks on London residents or former residents who have applied to the Criminal Records Bureau for an enhanced disclosure and deals with subject access requests under the Data Protection Act. It previously also published the Police Gazette on behalf of the UK Police Forces.
