= Listed buildings in Nottingham (Wollaton East and Lenton Abbey ward) =

Wollaton East and Lenton Abbey ward is an electoral ward in the city of Nottingham, England. The ward contains 32 listed buildings that are recorded in the National Heritage List for England. All the listed buildings are designated at Grade II, the lowest of the three grades, which is applied to "buildings of national importance and special interest". The ward is to the west of the centre of the city, and it contains listed buildings associated with the University of Nottingham. Also in the ward is Highfields Park, and the listed buildings within the park include a cascade and stepping stones, two footbridges, and a landing stage. To the north of the ward are listed buildings associated with Wollaton Park, and the other listed buildings include houses and associated structures, lodges, a parish hall and a vicarage.

== Buildings ==
Name and location	Photograph	Date	Notes
Park wall southwest of Beeston Lodge; 52.94095°N 1.20891°W	—	Late 18th century	The wall enclosing the grounds of Wollaton Park to the southwest of the lodge is in brick with gabled coping. It runs to the southwest for about 700 metres (2,300 ft) and contains four square piers with stone caps, then runs to the northwest for about 200 metres (660 ft).
Park wall to east of Beeston Lodge; 52.94405°N 1.19914°W	—	Late 18th century	The wall enclosing the grounds of Wollaton Park to the east of the lodge is in brick with gabled coping. It is about 3 metres (9.8 ft) high at the west end, lowering to about 1.5 metres (4 ft 11 in) at the east end, and it extends for about 650 metres (2,130 ft).
Remains of park wall between Adams Hill and Middleton Boulevard; 52.94464°N 1.19263°W	—	Late 18th century	The wall enclosing the grounds of Wollaton Park is in brick with gabled coping. It is about 2 metres (6 ft 7 in) high at the west end, lowering to about 1.5 metres (4 ft 11 in) at the east end, and it extends for about 350 metres (1,150 ft).
Gateway, Lime Tree Avenue entrance to Wollaton Park; 52.94715°N 1.19616°W		1790	The gates, which were designed by William Stretton, are in wrought iron, are ornamental with cresting. They are flanked by a pair of cast iron gate piers, with panelled sides, moulded bases and caps, and spire finials.
Highfield House; 52.93728°N 1.19729°W		1797	The house in the grounds of the University of Nottingham is stuccoed, on a plinth, with a cornice and blocking course, and a hipped slate roof. There are two storeys and an L-shaped plan, with fronts of four and six bays. Most of the windows are sashes in moulded surrounds, one converted into a French window.
Lenton Abbey; 52.93899°N 1.20968°W	—	c. 1800	A house, later divided into flats, it is stuccoed, on a plinth, and has deep eaves with modillions, and a hipped slate roof. There are two storeys, fronts of five and four bays, a central canted projection, and other wings and extensions. The porch is stuccoed, with pilasters and an entablature, and a round-arched doorway with a rusticated surround and a keystone, and at the rear is a round-arched doorway with a fanlight. The windows are sashes with moulded surrounds, and there is a canted bay window. On the right is a yard wall with a gateway flanked by piers with ball finials.
Lenton House; 52.93778°N 1.20049°W	—	1800	A house which was later extended and used for other purposes, it is stuccoed, on a plinth, with a moulded eaves cornice, and a hipped Westmorland slate roof. There are two storeys, with a basement to the extension, an L-shaped plan, and fronts of three bays. Most of the windows are sashes, there is a canted bay window on the south front, and a bow window on the west front. The entrance front is in a courtyard to the north, in the centre is a square two-storey porch with a cornice and a parapet, and a recessed Doric portico, above which is a tripartite round-arched stair window. In the courtyard is a screen wall with a gateway, the extension has a projecting basement with a balustrade, at the rear is a service range, and beyond that are three ranges of service buildings in one and two storeys.
Sundial; 52.93951°N 1.19629°W	—	c. 1803	The sundial is in the garden of the warden's house, Hugh Stewart Hall. It is in stone and about 1 metre (3 ft 3 in) high. The sundial has a baluster-shaped stem with a plinth and a cornice on a square base, and a dial plate.
Warden's House, Hugh Stewart Hall; 52.93999°N 1.19674°W		1804	A country house designed by William Stretton and later used for other purposes, it is in stone on a plinth, with an embattled parapet, embattled octagonal turrets, and a gambrel roof in lead and slate. There are two storeys and fronts of five and seven bays. The middle three bays of the entrance front have turrets, and a central embattled porch with corner turrets and a doorway with a pointed arch. The middle bay of the garden front projects under a shaped gable containing a sundial, and pinnacles. It contains a porch with angle buttresses, a segmental pediment, and an elongated keystone. Most of the windows are sashes.
Lenton Grove; 52.93583°N 1.20375°W		c. 1825	A house later used for other purposes, it is roughcast, on a plinth, with an eaves cornice and a hipped slate roof. There are two storeys, fronts of five and three bays, and two single-bay extensions on the left, one with a pediment. The central doorway, which has been converted into a doorway, has a flat hood, most of the other windows are sashes, and at the rear is a segmental-headed stair window.
Gateway, Lenton Grove; 52.93596°N 1.20332°W	—	c. 1825	Flanking the entrance to the drive are two painted square stone piers with ogee-headed panels and ball finials. Between them are spiked wrought iron gates.
Lenton Firs Lodge (West); 52.94460°N 1.19641°W		c. 1830	The lodge is in brick with a stone front, all painted, on a plinth, with a string course, a moulded coped parapet, and a hipped slate roof. There is a single storey and a cruciform plan, with three bays. The central bay towards the drive projects, and contains a flat-roofed porch with a Tudor arched doorway, the windows have moulded surrounds and hood moulds, and some have mullions.
Beeston Lodge and walls 52.94209°N 1.20510°W		1832	The lodge, designed by Jeffry Wyatville, is in gritstone, and consists of a gatehouse flanked by towers. In the centre is a Tudor arched carriage entrance, above which is an oriel window, a moulded string course, and an embattled parapet flanked by corner pinnacles with cast iron chimney pots. The towers are round, embattled, and contain slit windows. On each side of the lodge is a stone wall with gabled coping, about 3 metres (9.8 ft) high and extending for about 25 metres (82 ft).
Gateway and railings, Lodge east of Charles Avenue; 52.93962°N 1.21149°W		c. 1840	At the gateway are two panelled square stuccoed gate piers with cornices, and between them are wrought iron gates. On each side is a convex-curved spearhead railing on a brick plinth extending for about 6 metres (20 ft), and ending in square brick piers.
Lenton Fields; 52.93883°N 1.20644°W	—	1836–37	A house, later a hall of residence, it is stuccoed, on a plinth, with a rusticated ground floor, a floor band, an eaves cornice and blocking course, and a hipped slate roof. There are two storeys and fronts of three bays, a recessed service range, and a single-storey three-bay billiard room. On the front is a Doric portico. Most of the windows are sashes with moulded surrounds, and on the west front is a bow window.
Lodge east of Charles Avenue; 52.93963°N 1.21134°W		Mid 19th century	A lodge, later a private house, in painted brick, with a dentilled floor band and a hipped patterned tile roof with a tile crest. There are two storeys and fronts of two bays. Most of the windows are casements with mullions, and those in the upper floor are through-eaves dormers with shouldered coped gables. On the drive side is a gabled porch with a dormer above, and on the road side is a canted bay window with a hipped roof, and a dormer above.
Lodge, Lenton Abbey Recreation Ground; 52.93880°N 1.21587°W		c. 1860	The lodge, later a private house, is in red and yellow brick on a blue brick plinth, with dressings in blue brick and stone, polychrome bands, moulded eaves and a hipped tile roof. There are two storeys and a single bay. The middle bay on the entrance front projects under a coped gable with a finial, it has corbelled angle corners, and contains a round-arched doorway with a round-arched window above. The left return has a hip-roofed projection containing windows with a quatrefoil above.
Cascade and stepping stones, west end of Boating Lake; 52.93392°N 1.19979°W		1922–28	The cascade in Highfields Park has been created from natural rock. It has a U-shaped plan, and consists of an irregular recess simulating a natural feature, with a waterfall. Across the east end is a curving row of large stepping stones.
Footbridge on Boating Lake (north); 52.93542°N 1.19711°W		1922–28	The footbridge crossing the lake in Highfields Park is in stone, and consists of a single segmental arch. It has voussoirs, a balustrade with a central pedestal, and end piers.
Footbridge on Boating Lake (south); 52.93519°N 1.19631°W		1922–28	The footbridge crossing the lake in Highfields Park is in stone, and consists of a single segmental arch. It has voussoirs, a balustrade with a central pedestal, and end piers.
Lakeside terraces and steps, north side of Boating Lake; 52.93636°N 1.19525°W		1922–28	The structures overlooking the lake in Highfields Park are in stone. The lower terrace wall has a balustrade and a projecting centre and end bays, and in the centre is a half-domed recess. The central terrace wall has a larger projecting centre with three round-arched recesses under a balustrade, and projecting end bays, each with a round-arched opening and steps. Above and behind are steps flanked by terrace walls with slab coping.
Landing stage, south side of Boating Lake; 52.93570°N 1.19435°W		1922–28	The landing stage on the south side of the lake in Highfields Park is in reconstituted stone. It consists of a series of steps with end piers, and extends for about 25 metres (82 ft).
Trent Building; 52.93690°N 1.19595°W		1922–28	The university building, designed by Morley Horder, is in Portland stone, with a string course, cornices, coped parapets, and copper roofs. It has two storeys, basements and attics, and a central block of 17 bays with slightly projecting seven-bay wings. In the middle of the central block is a projecting three-bay portico with a pediment containing a crest. Behind the portico is a square bell tower with angle pilasters, clock faces in the middle stage, and a pyramidal roof with a wind vane. At the rear is a central quadrangle flanked by open-ended courtyards. The main entrance is in the quadrangle and has a two-storey round-arched opening containing a doorway with a moulded surround, above which is a Diocletian window. Most of the windows are sashes, and the bays in the wings are divided by pilasters.
Lenton House Lodge; 52.93694°N 1.20429°W		1926	The lodge is rendered, on a plinth, with deep eaves and a hipped slate roof. There are two storeys, an L-shaped plan, and a single bay. The entrance bay is recessed, it contains a doorway with a hood, and most of the windows are casements with Gothic tracery.
Gateway, railings and fences, East Entrance to Wollaton Park; 52.94675°N 1.19153°W		c. 1926	The structures form a semicircle, with the gateway to Lime Tree Avenue in the centre. The gateway is flanked by square stone gate piers with cornice caps, between which are wrought iron gates with crests. On each side, railings on a stone chamfered plinth curve to square end piers, beyond which are curved wooden fences with single gateways and small square piers.
East Lodge and screen wall 52.93529°N 1.20167°W		c. 1928	The lodge at the entrance to West Drive is in stone on a plinth, with pediments, a parapet and lead roofs. There is a single storey, a cruciform plan, and a single bay. Each side has a pedimented bay containing a sash window with a moulded surround, a frieze and a cornice, above which is a small sash window with a plain surround. The pediment on the front contains a cartouche. On the drive side is a coped stone screen wall on a plinth, ending in a square pie with an urn.
West Lodge and screen wall 52.93512°N 1.20190°W		c. 1928	The lodge at the entrance to West Drive is in stone on a plinth, with pediments, a parapet and lead roofs. There is a single storey, a cruciform plan, and a single bay. Each side has a pedimented bay containing a sash window with a moulded surround, a frieze and a cornice, above which is a small sash window with a plain surround. The pediment on the front contains a cartouche. On the drive side is a coped stone screen wall on a plinth, ending in a square pie with an urn.
Parish Hall, St Mary's Church; 52.94687°N 1.18716°W	—	1937–39	The parish hall, designed by T. Cecil Howitt, is in buff brick on a plinth, with gutters on scroll brackets, and a tile roof. There is a single storey and four bays, with the centre recessed, and the outer bays forming gabled wings. The windows are casements with brick moulded surrounds, mullions and transoms.
Vicarage, St Mary's Church; 52.94669°N 1.18692°W	—	1937–39	The vicarage was designed by T. Cecil Howitt, and is in buff brick on a plinth, with a tile roof. There are two storeys and three bays, the middle bay projecting under a gable. The windows are casements with moulded brick surrounds and mullions. In the right return is a recessed porch.
Cripps Hall of Residence; 52.94240°N 1.19536°W		1957–59	The hall of residence is in buff brick with stone dressings, parapets and hipped green slate roofs. It consists of three-storey residential blocks and a single-story Great Hall range, and forms two quadrangles, joined at their corners, surrounded by linked blocks. The entrance range has two storeys, and contains a central opening with two giant Ionic columns. The warden's house has two storeys, fronts of three bays, and a pyramidal roof. Most of the windows are sashes with flat brick arches. On the Great Hall is a square clock tower, with a clock dial on the west, and a segment-arched belfry with a slab roof and a weather vane.
Detached block 10 metres southeast of Cripps Hall of Residence; 52.94173°N 1.19456°W	—	1957–59	The block is in buff brick with stone dressings, parapets and hipped green slate roofs. It is rectangular with three storeys and ten bays, and most of the windows are sashes with flat brick arches.
Detached block 20 metres southeast of Cripps Hall of Residence; 52.94207°N 1.19474°W	—	1957–59	The block is in buff brick with stone dressings, parapets and hipped green slate roofs. It is rectangular with three storeys and ten bays, and most of the windows are sashes with flat brick arches.
