= Horace Bloomfield =

English cricketer

Personal information
- Born: 15 July 1891; Brixton, London
- Died: 31 May 1973 (aged 81); Hillhead, Hampshire
- Source: Cricinfo, 12 March 2017

Horace Orlando Bloomfield (15 July 1891 – 31 May 1973) was an English cricketer. He played four first-class matches for Surrey between 1921 and 1922, scoring an unbeaten 107 on debut against Northamptonshire.

In 1909 at the Private Banks Sports Ground Bloomfield had a successful season with the bat. In 1927 he played for a Lloyds Bank XI.

Bloomfield married Muriel Maude Holland, daughter of Surrey cricketer, Fred Holland, at Penge Congregational Church in 1922.

== See also ==
- List of Surrey County Cricket Club players
