= Fred Holland =

English cricketer

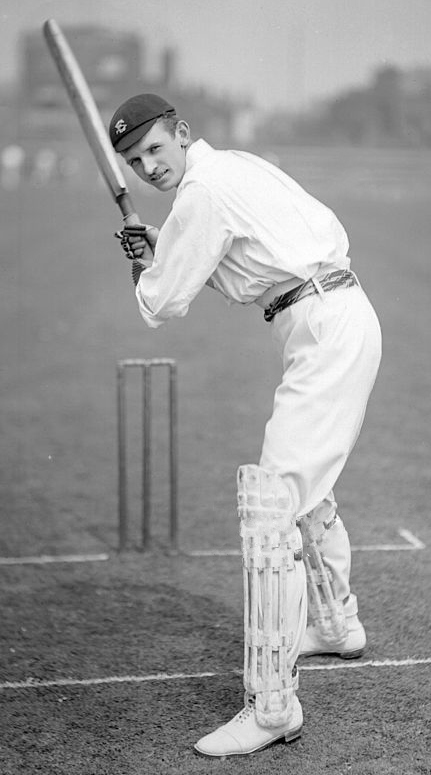
- Holland pictured in around 1900

Personal information
- Full name: Frederick Charles Holland
- Born: 10 February 1876; Battersea, London, England
- Died: 5 February 1957 (aged 80); Crystal Palace, London, England
- Batting: Right-handed
- Bowling: Right-arm slow
- Role: Batsman

Domestic team information
- Years: Team
- 1894–1908: Surrey
- FC debut: 30 August 1894 Surrey v Essex
- Last FC: 12 August 1908 Surrey v Sussex

Career statistics
Competition	First-class
Matches	284
Runs scored	10,384
Batting average	25.96
100s/50s	12/51
Top score	171
Balls bowled	917
Wickets	13
Bowling average	43.84
5 wickets in innings	0
10 wickets in match	0
Best bowling	2/20
Catches/stumpings	232/–
- Source: CricketArchive, 9 May 2008

Frederick Charles Holland (10 February 1876 – 5 February 1957) was an English cricketer who played for Surrey between 1894 and 1908. He was a batsman, a very occasional slow bowler, and a slip fielder. His Wisden obituary said of his batting: "Of graceful style, he showed to special advantage in cutting and hitting to leg..." He exceeded one thousand runs in a season on four occasions. During his time with Surrey they won the County Championship in 1894, 1895, and 1899, though only in 1895 did he make a significant contribution.

== Professional cricketer ==
Holland had seven elder brothers who encouraged him to join in their games of cricket from when he was only three years old. He joined the Surrey ground staff when he was 17. He made a successful debut for the county, aged 18, in his only first-class appearance of the 1894 season, in a non-Championship fixture against Essex. He scored 76 in his only innings.

The following season, he played in 22 matches and scored 832 runs at an average of 33.28. This would prove to be one of only two times that his season's batting average exceeded 30. He made his first two centuries, including his career highest score of 171 against Cambridge University. He and Bobby Abel added 306 for the third wicket.

In 1896 he made two more hundreds, but his average declined to 24.26. In 1897 he played in only nine matches, but 1898 was his best year. He passed one thousand runs for the first time, recorded his best average of 34.25, and made two more hundreds. However the following season he played in only four fixtures. He was a regular in the side once more in 1900, but in 20 fixtures he managed only 571 runs at an average of 20.39.

1901 was a better year, with two centuries in 16 matches, and a total of 701 runs at 25.96. However the next season he appeared only seven times.

From 1903 until the end of his career, he was no longer in and out of the side but appeared in almost every fixture, even though his seasonal average never rose above the twenties. He scored 1129 runs in 30 matches in 1903, his highest aggregate, but his highest score was only 97 and his average 23.52. His next season scores were worse, with 848 runs from 25 matches at 20.68, but he did manage one century.

During his last four seasons (1905 to 1908) he managed to keep his average in the upper twenties. His slip catching also came to the fore. Having never previously held more than 18 catches in a season, he now managed 30, 30, 23 and 32. In 1905, 26 matches yielded 1079 runs at 27.66, with one hundred. His figures the next season were very similar: 26 matches, 968 runs at 28.47 and two hundreds. In 1907 he played as many as 31 matches, scoring 1081 runs. Though his highest score was only 72, he was consistent enough to average 26.36. In his final season, he scored 664 runs in 21 matches at 28.86. again failed to make a century, but in scoring 87 against Somerset he assisted Jack Crawford (who made 232) to put on 308 for the fifth wicket. This stood as the Surrey record for this wicket until Mark Ramprakash and Azhar Mahmood had a partnership of 311 in 2005.

== Later life ==
Leaving Surrey in 1909, Holland became the cricket coach at Oundle School.

His son-in-law Horace Bloomfield also played for Surrey; Bloomfield married Holland's daughter, Muriel Maude Holland, at Penge Congregational Church in 1922.
