= Pinfold Manor =

Coordinates: 51°16′50″N 0°14′37″W

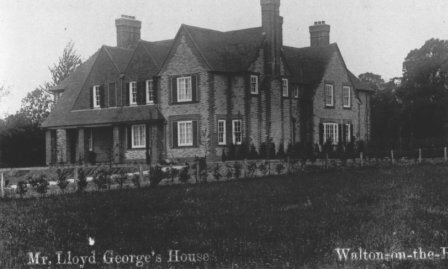
"Mr Lloyd George's House, Walton-on-the-Hill"

Pinfold Manor is a seven-bedroom Edwardian villa in Walton-on-the-Hill, Surrey, England. It was one of several houses built on land donated by Sir George Riddell, owner of the News of the World, to prominent politicians from the Liberal Party. It was built close to Walton Heath Golf Club between 1912 and 1913 for David Lloyd George, then Chancellor of the Exchequer. The architect was Percy Morley Horder, following sketches given to Riddell by Edwin Lutyens.

The almost completed house was damaged in February 1913 in a bomb attack by the Women's Social and Political Union. The house was completed, and occupied by Lloyd George until around 1919.

Pinfold Manor became a Grade II listed building in 1990.

== Description ==
The two-storey house is constructed from silver-grey bricks, with red brick dressings at the corners around windows, and a roof of red clay tiles.

The main entrance front faces to the north, with a service wing at the east end, which was extended to the north and east soon after the initial construction was completed. The entrance is framed by red brick pilasters, with sash windows to either side under curved brick heads.

The other main frontage faces the garden to the south. The red tiles of the roof run down to a single-storey loggia supported by square brick columns, which continues to the east under two tile-hung gables. A third gabled bay to the east is faced in silver grey and red brick, with a large casement windows with side sashes on each floor.

The east front has a gabled wing at the south end and a canted chimney stack. A single storey extension at the north end was added after 1912.

There is little to note in the interiors, apart from the fireplaces in the study, dining room and one bedroom. The staircase rises in the angle between the main entrance front and the service wing.

== History ==
Shortly after 6am on 19 February 1913, the almost completed house was bombed by militant suffragettes from the Women's Social and Political Union. Two bombs were planted: one failed to explode, but the detonation of the second bomb caused significant damage to the house. The bombers were not identified, but Sylvia Pankhurst named Emily Davison in her memoirs, and it has been suggested that Norah Smyth or Olive Hockin may also have been involved.

That evening, Emmeline Pankhurst claimed responsibility at a public meeting at Cory Hall, Cardiff, saying: "We have blown up the Chancellor of the Exchequer's house … to wake him up". After this admission, she was arrested for the first time. She was tried at the Old Bailey in April 1913 on charges of conspiracy to commit property damage, convicted, and sentenced to three years of penal service. She was held at Holloway Prison, but released after starting a hunger strike.

The house was repaired, and Lloyd George moved in. He relocated around 1919, first moving to The Firs (now Upper Court) near Cobham, and then from 1921 he resided at Bron-y-de in Churt with his secretary and mistress, later his second wife, Frances Stevenson.

Pinfold Manor became a Grade II listed building in January 1990. It was on sale in 2010 priced at £2.5 million.
