= Walton-on-the-Hill =

Village in Surrey, England

Coordinates: 51.28000°N 0.24700°W

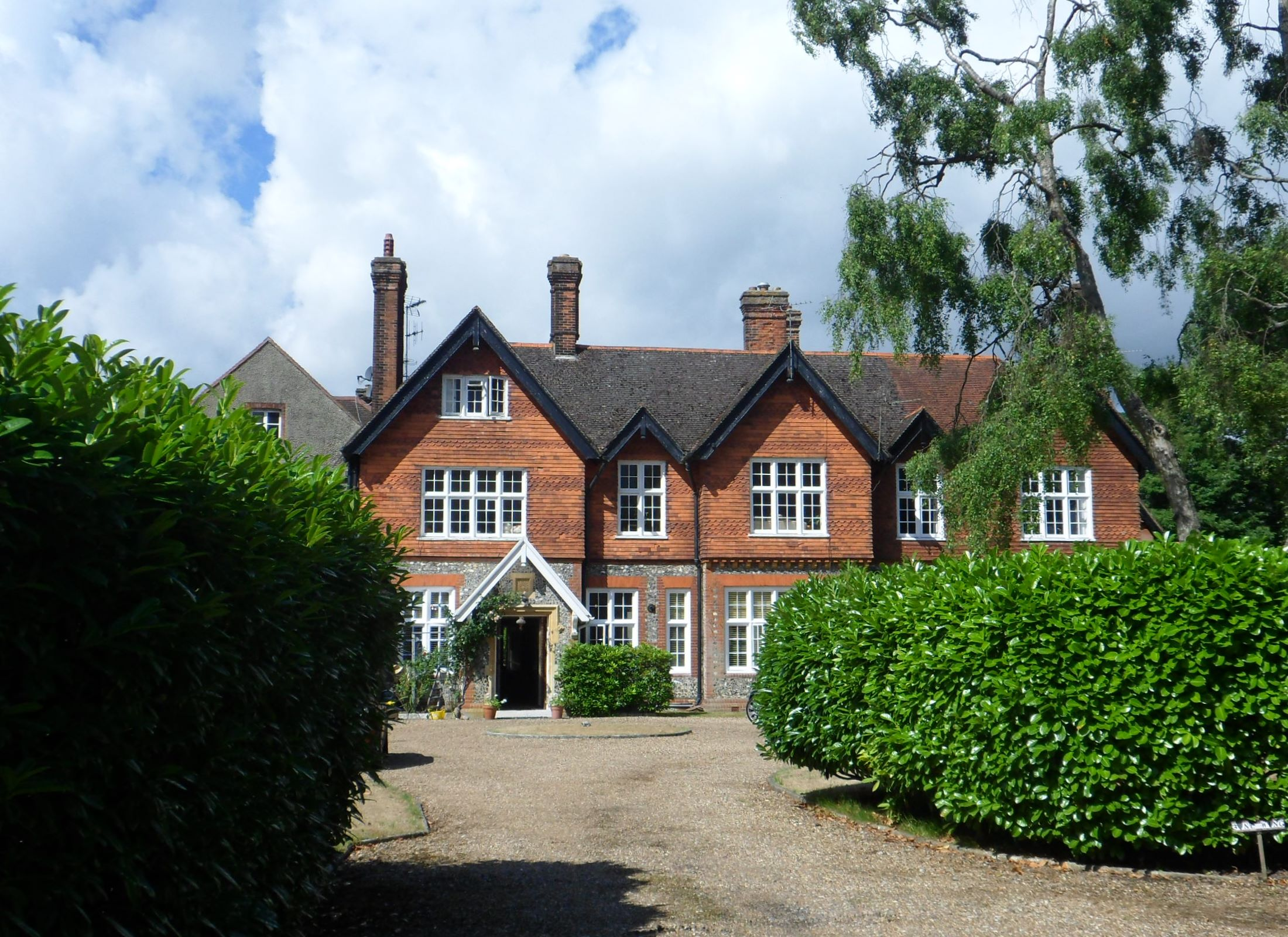
- The manor house

- Location within Surrey
- Population: 1,889
- OS grid reference: TQ205605
- District: Reigate and Banstead
- Shire county: Surrey
- Region: South East
- Country: England
- Sovereign state: United Kingdom
- Post town: Tadworth
- Postcode district: KT20
- Dialling code: 01737
- Police: Surrey
- Fire: Surrey
- Ambulance: South East Coast
- UK Parliament: Reigate

Walton-on-the-Hill is a village in the Reigate and Banstead district, in the county of Surrey, England. It is midway between the market towns of Reigate and Epsom. The village is a dispersed cluster on the North Downs centred less than one mile inside of the M25 motorway. The village hosts the Walton Heath Golf Club, whose former members include King Edward VIII, Winston Churchill and David Lloyd George. Walton Heath Golf Club hosted the 1981 Ryder Cup.

== Geography ==
The M25 motorway, less than a mile from the centre, roughly marks the northern boundary of the Surrey Hills AONB (Area of Outstanding Natural Beauty); it contains the village among others and orbits London. The village except for one street is surrounded by Green Belt including farmland and protected heathland managed by the Banstead Common Conservators. Along its green buffers it borders to the north-east its post town, Tadworth and Kingswood, Headley and Box Hill. Tadworth railway station is the nearest station about 1 mile (1.6 km) from its centre which provides a commuter line into London Bridge Station. Its normal broad definition, the former civil parish, which resembles its ecclesiastical parish of ancient foundation, is in the Tadworth and Walton Ward of Reigate and Banstead Council. Across the motorway – within its long-established bounds – is the Headquarters of Pfizer UK at the business park known as The Hermitage.

Walton-on-the-Hill has a large pond, a green, a primary school, an independent preparatory school for girls, convenience/repair shops and public houses.

The village is home to Walton Heath Golf Club, whose former members include King Edward VIII, Winston Churchill and David Lloyd George.

== History ==
The Romans are known to have settled here in the 1st century AD: a substantial villa has been excavated in Sandlands Road, and is believed to have been inhabited until around 400 AD. Roman finds have been discovered here and in the neighbouring village of Headley.

Walton-on-the-Hill lay within the Copthorne hundred, an administrative division devised by the Saxons.

Walton-on-the-Hill was called Waltone in Domesday Book of 1086. It was held by John from Richard Fitz Gilbert. Its Domesday assets were: 2 hides and 1 virgate. It had 5½ ploughs, 1 house in Southwark. It rendered £6. There is an early post-conquest motte within the grounds of Walton Place, the remains of a timber castle. The name Walton comes from settlement/farmstead of Wealas – Anglo-Saxon (Old English) for "Celtic-speaking tribes" or by derivation, "strangers/foreigners", see later form Welsh people and related old-fashioned phrases.

A legal record of 1418 mentioning 'Wauton Athill may refer to the village.

In 1951 the civil parish had a population of 2158. On 1 April 1974 the parish was abolished.

== Landmarks ==
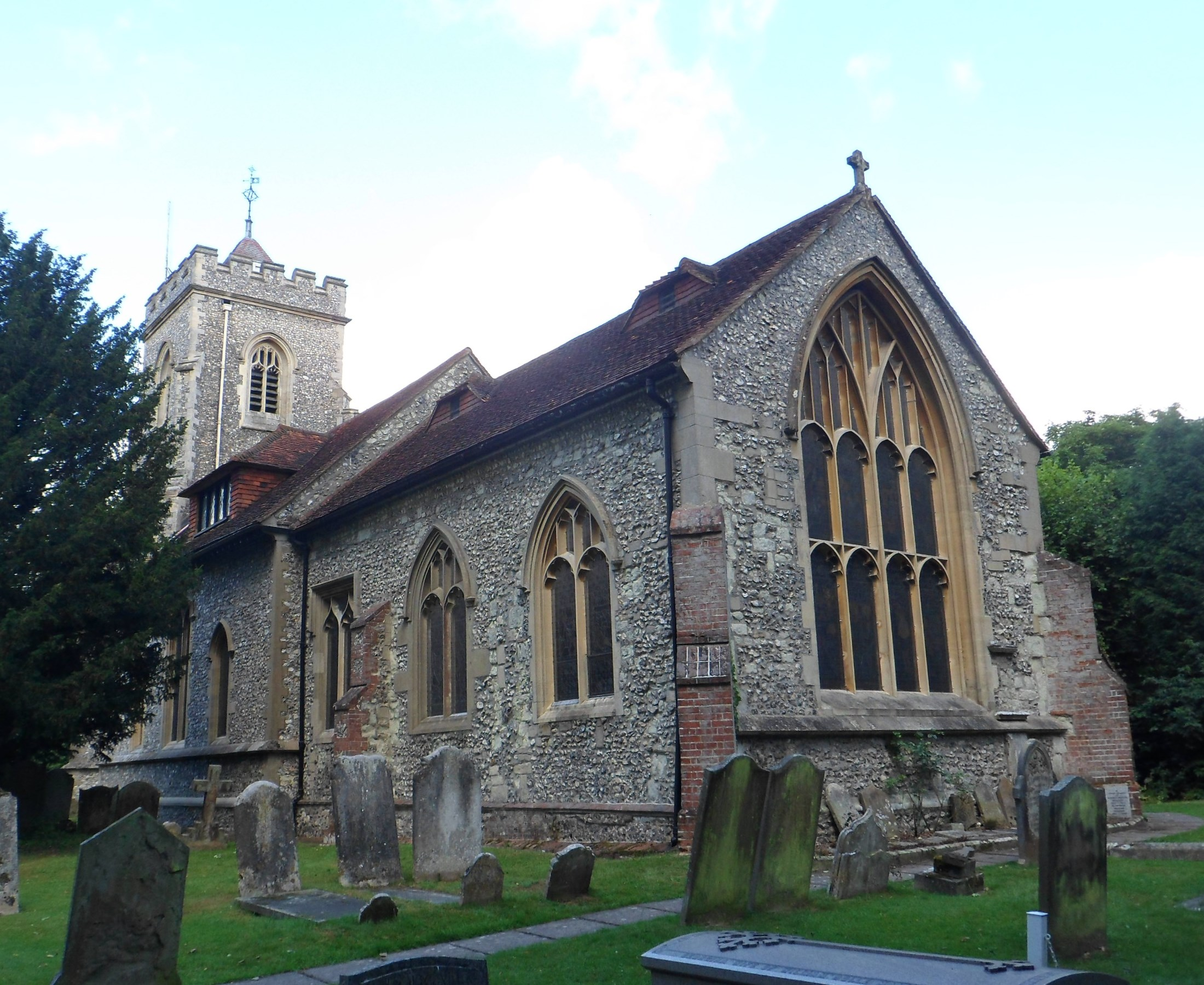
St Peter's (C of E) Church in the Ecclesiastical Parish of Walton on the Hill

=== Mound ===
This is a scheduled monument built at a date in period from the 11th to 13th centuries, covering a small area in Walton Place by the public road, standing 2.4 metres above the land to all sides. The manor of Walton was held by Richard de Tonbridge soon after the Norman Conquest and later by Gilbert de Clare (or Fitz Richard), both of whom are known to be prolific castle builders, but it was also owned by the Carew family in the early 17th century at which time the manor house was extensively rebuilt, who English Heritage believe therefore slightly altered it as a garden feature.

=== St Peter's Church ===
The church of St Peter partially dates to the 12th century; one of its oldest features is an 800-year-old font, constructed in lead, although this is thought to have originally stood in a chapel alongside the village's manor house, which is equally Grade II* listed. The interior of the church features examples of 16th-century artwork and stained glass. Another old church font was set up as a mounting stone outside the nearby public house.

=== Manor house ===
The house has features from the 14th century onwards, though was remodelled in the 16th century and the late 19th century and has been much reduced. Some of the tilework is in the technique of Norman Shaw.

Local oral history has it that the manor house was visited by Henry VIII, and his wife Anne of Cleves is also thought to have stayed here.

=== Walton Oaks ===
Pharmaceutical company Pfizer's offices were built on the site of the Hermitage country house at Walton Oaks. A separate entrance leads to the remaining Hermitage Lodge and farm cottages. Local planning guidance issued in 2001 notes that at Walton Oaks the 1920 formal gardens, pond and temple by the architect Morley Horder and the adjoining rhododendron walks are of interest. The Victorian sunken garden and Georgian parkland trees of the Hermitage within the Walton Oaks site are also of interest.

== Buildings ==
There is a wide variety of housing, in size, type and age. The earliest buildings include Walton Manor with its 14th-century foundations and a number of 16th- and 17th-century properties in Walton Street and Deans Lane.

Closer to the centre are smaller Victorian houses, while further out and especially to the south of the village are larger detached houses on private roads. Many of these were built in the early to mid-20th century and include designs by architect Sir Edwin Lutyens and his followers. Prime Minister David Lloyd George owned one such property, Pinfold Manor on Nursery Road. On 19 February 1913, Pinfold Manor was bombed by the Women's Social and Political Union, a militant suffragette group led by Emmeline Pankhurst. The house was repaired and still stands today.

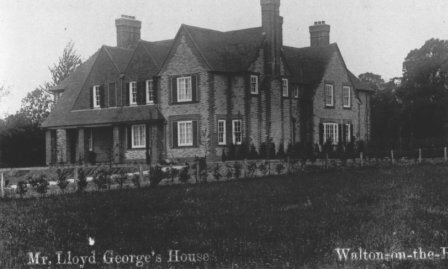
Pinfold Manor, built for David LLoyd George in 1912.

In the centre of the village are more recent developments of flats, including retirement flats. Bramley School, an independent day school for girls aged three to eleven was located in the village. but closed in 2017.

St Cross was a large building to the north of the village which was formerly a boys' school. From 1948 it was a British Transport Police Training Centre with a police dog training school. The building has since been demolished and replaced with a small housing development.

== Notable residents ==
Prime Minister David Lloyd George

Sir Anthony Hope Hawkins, author

James Braid, champion golfer

Mary Millington, pornographic actress

The Baroness Carr of Walton-on-the-Hill, Lady Chief Justice of England and Wales.

== See also ==
- List of places of worship in Reigate and Banstead
- Walton-on-Thames, which is located about 15 miles (24 km) to the north-west, in the Borough of Elmbridge in the same county, hence a suffix is typically seen in most publications after both places.
