= Highfields Park, Nottingham =

Park in Nottingham, England

Highfields Park
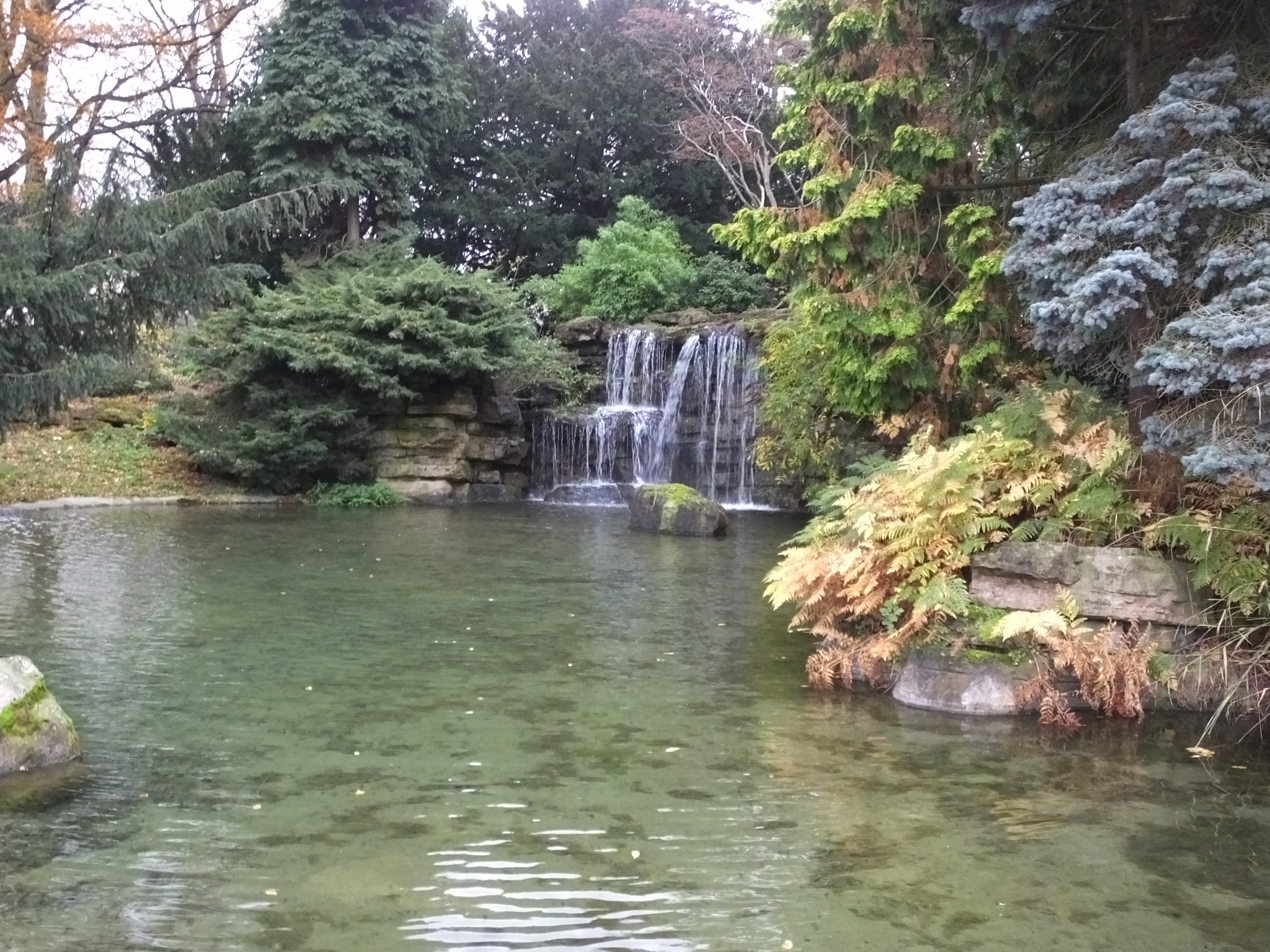
- The cascade in Highfields Park, November 2015
- Interactive map of Highfields Park
- Location: Nottingham
- Area: 121 acres (49 ha)
- Created: 1920
- Operator: Nottingham City Council
- Open: 1926 (fully)
- Designation: Grade II Listed

Highfields Park is Grade II listed park providing 121 acres (49 ha) of public space, in the west of Nottingham, England. It is owned and maintained by Nottingham City Council. It located alongside University Boulevard, adjoining the University of Nottingham's University Park campus. Due to its proximity to the university campus to the north, Highfields Park appears to be a part of the campus itself and therefore many refer to the whole area as University Park. There are historical ties between the park and the campus. The park contains a boating lake, complete with boats to hire throughout the summer months. The cascade and the stepping stones at the western end are Grade II listed. To the south of the lake the Tottle Brook, a tributary of the River Trent, flows on the surface, this brook is culverted for much of its length. At the eastern end there are children's play facilities and a pavilion with a cafe.

== History ==
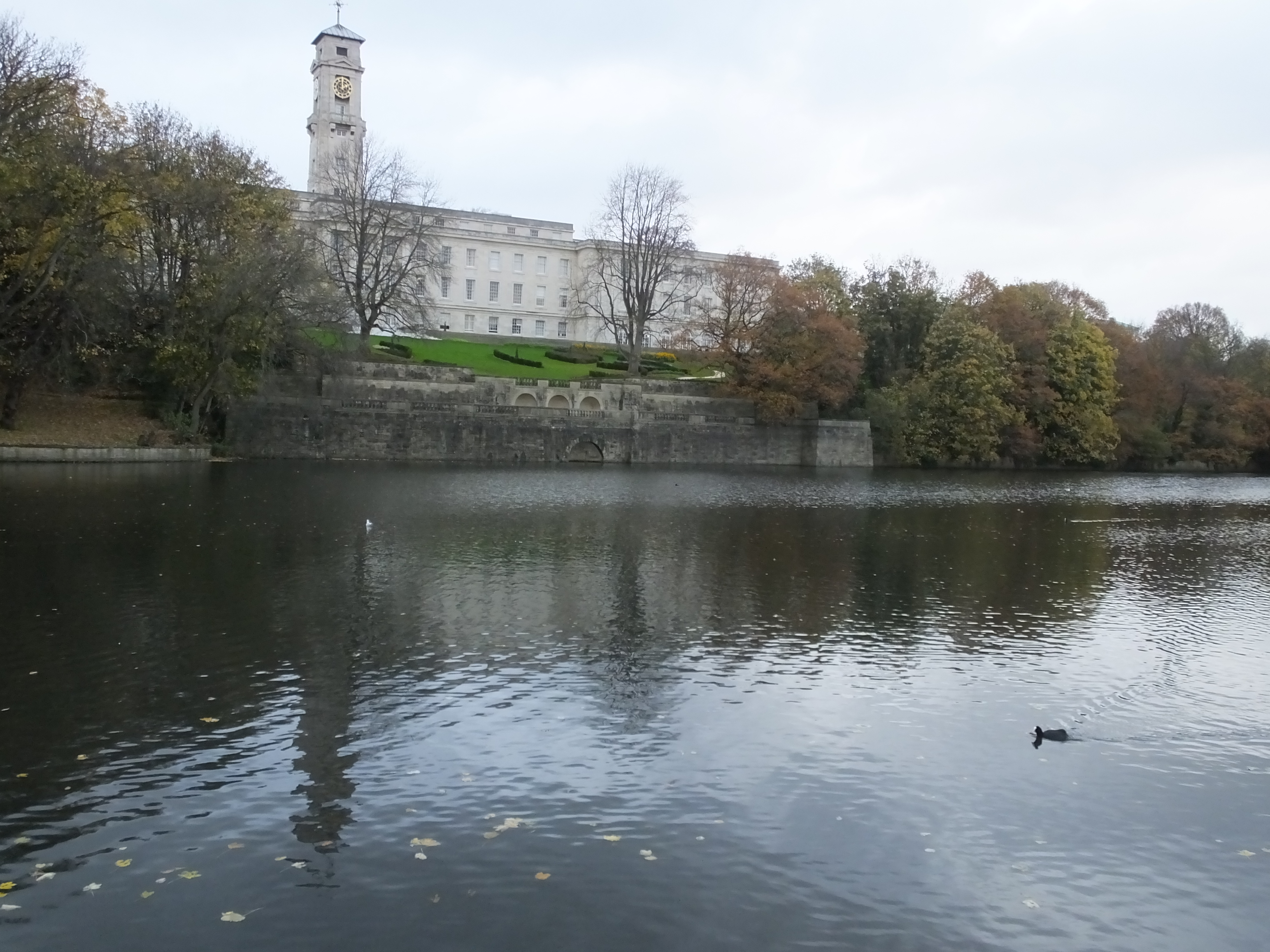
The fish pond, with the University of Nottingham's Trent Building overlooking it

The site, originally part of the Highfields Estate, belonged to Joseph Lowe who along with his son Alfred, developed the site in the late 18th century and were responsible for much of the landscaping that is visible today. In 1789 Joseph Lowe constructed 'Highfield House' which was to be used as his residence. (Note: The house was designed by a William Wilkins (1751–1815), architect to the Duke of Newcastle, who also designed Donington Hall . The house was too small for effective university use, so has been remodelled and restored in 2012) Lowe improved the estate with the creation of a fish pond from the existing Tottle Brook. The Lowes retained ownership up until 1920 when the land was purchased by Sir Jesse Boot (also known as Lord Trent) the founder of the Boot's the Chemist. His intention was to emulate Cadbury's at Bournville and the Levers at Port Sunlight and build high quality homes for his worker in the near adjacent purpose-built factories. The company was bought out by the American, Louis K. Liggett of the United Drug Company. Liggett had no interest in model housing. Jesse Boot was cash rich and owned 121 acres of land which he proceeded to disperse to good causes. Boot used 35 acres of the estate to form the core of East Midlands University. He built a raised road to connect Nottingham to Beeston, and landscaped the area south of the Trent building given as a park for Nottingham City Council. The remains of the estate, also called Highfields park, the other side of University Boulevard, was given over to sport fields. Also on the land he built a very large Lido, which, in 1922 was the largest in England.

The fishpond created by Joseph Lowe was enhanced and upgraded to a boating lake that still exists today, the spoil from this extensive excavation was used to raise the land level for the road. Until flood prevention measures became effective in the 1950s the River Trent had regularly flooded this part of its floodplain after heavy rain. The park was constructed between 1922 and 1926. Boot opened the park in stages so there was no formal opening. He gave the deeds to the land to Nottingham City Council in 1925, but retained the right to manage it for his lifetime. Boot died in 1931; Nottingham City Council formally adopted the park in 1932. The ornamental park was designed by Percy Richard Morley Horder who designed it in the Victorian municipal manner with areas of planting such as an azalea walk, areas for open air dancing (which was soon change to croquet) and crown green bowling. It had a paddling pool for children and boat trips, and rowing skiffs for hire on the lake.

The road cost £200,000 to construct.

The northern part of the land was prepared for the East Midland's first University which was a project largely funded by Sir Jesse Boot himself. This contained Highfields House, which became part the new university campus. The centre piece of the campus is the Trent Building with its tower. This provided a visual focus for the park too, the building, and its formal lawns share a visual axis with the lakeside terraces, and the formal main gate. To this vista, there have been added two monumental Chinese stone lions, gifted from City of Ningbo, China.

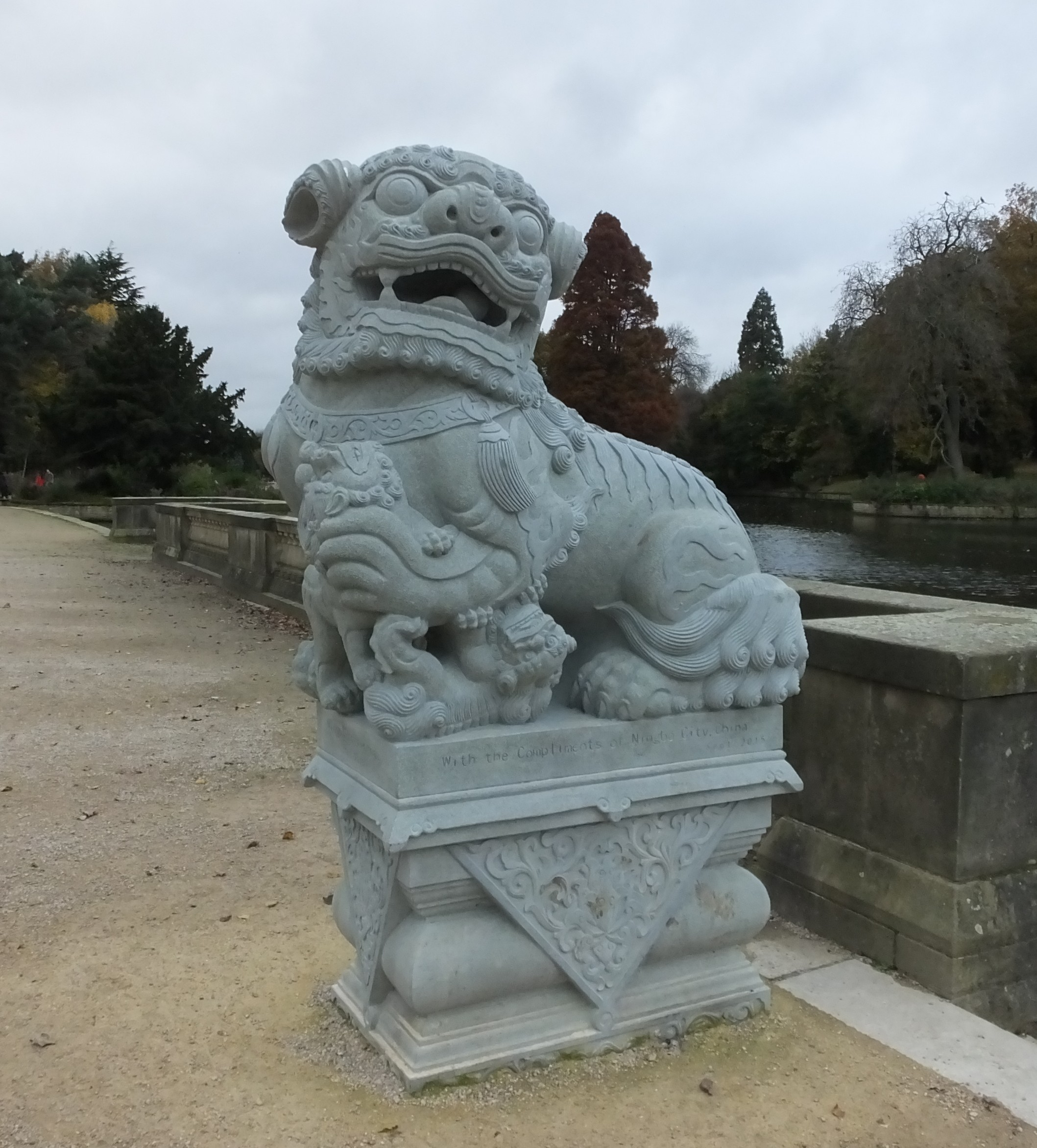
A stone lion with ball in its mouth and playful cubs, A gift from the City of Ningbo, China.

In the early 21st century the park was underfunded and neglected and the features fell into disuse. To attempt to save the park Nottingham City Council applied for £4 million funding from the National Lottery to de-silt the lake, and repair the Maid Marian pleasure boat so it could be reintroduced onto the lake. They applied to refurbish the site's historic pavilions, bridges and lighting columns and develop a new water park and adventure golf course. The National Lottery 'Parks for People Fund' have confirmed a Stage 2 pass for the £3,240,500 needed for the project in January 2015. Works are expected to take place on site in 2016. (Note: Other projects receiving an award were Houghton Hall Park, Bedfordshire with £2,196,600 and funding was earmarked for Stanmer Park, Brighton (£4,077,800), Cannon Hall Park and Gardens, Barnsley (£2,834,000), The Canons, Mitcham, South London (£3,981,500) Poole Park, Dorset (£2,970,200) and Bishop's Park, Carmarthenshire (£1,264,800))

== Features ==
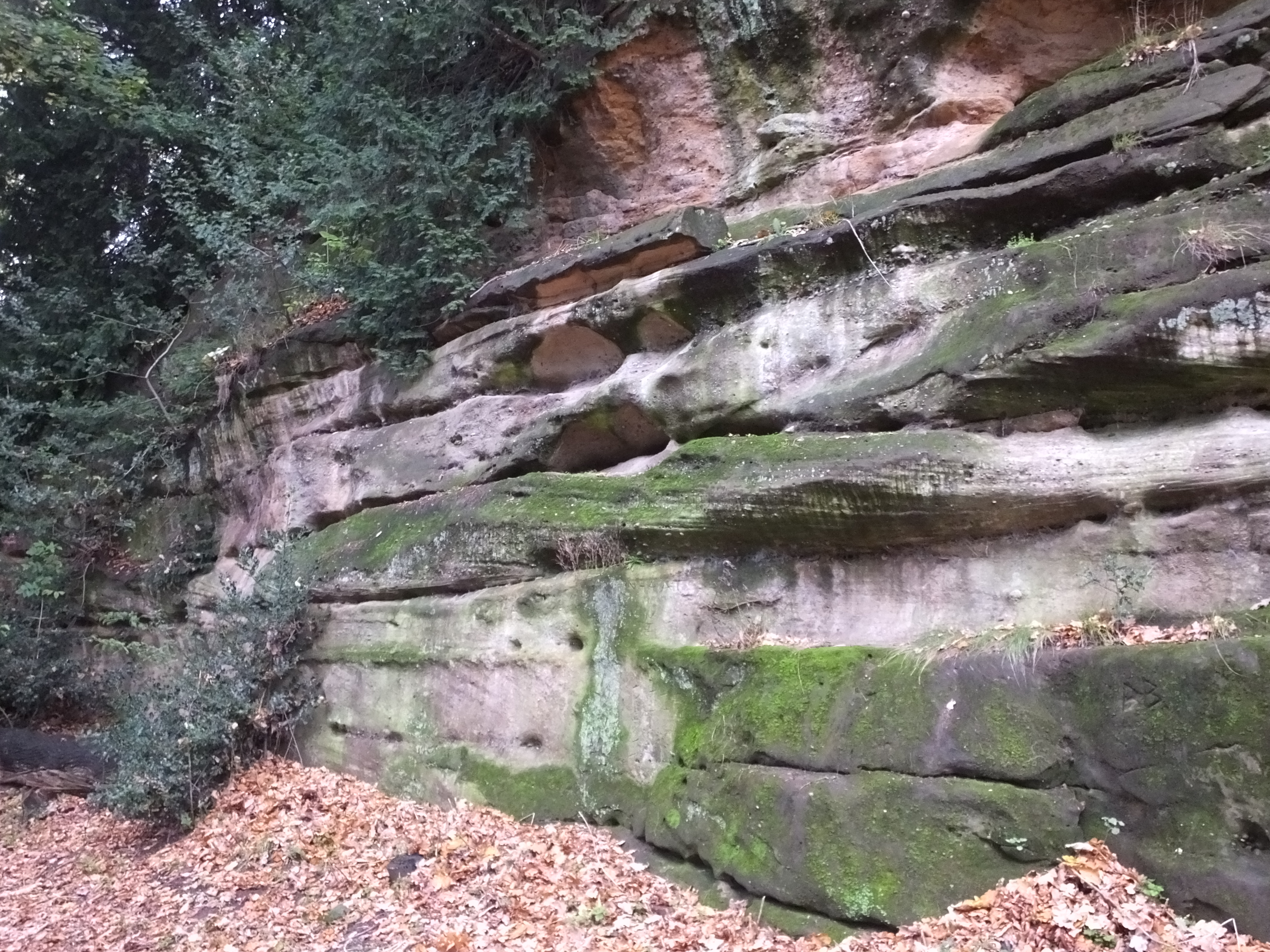
Natural sandstone outcrop

The park was designed in the valley of the Tottle Brook at the foot of a natural sandstone outcrop. The Tottle brook is used to source an ornamental boating lake; a new channel was dug for the brook to the south of the lake, leading from a culvert in the west to a culvert in the east. The boating lake features an island reached by ornamental bridges, to the west there is a cascade. In front of the cascade, the lake is crossed by a long run of stepping stones. A weir separated this part of the park from the boating. The lake is populated by ornamental carp.

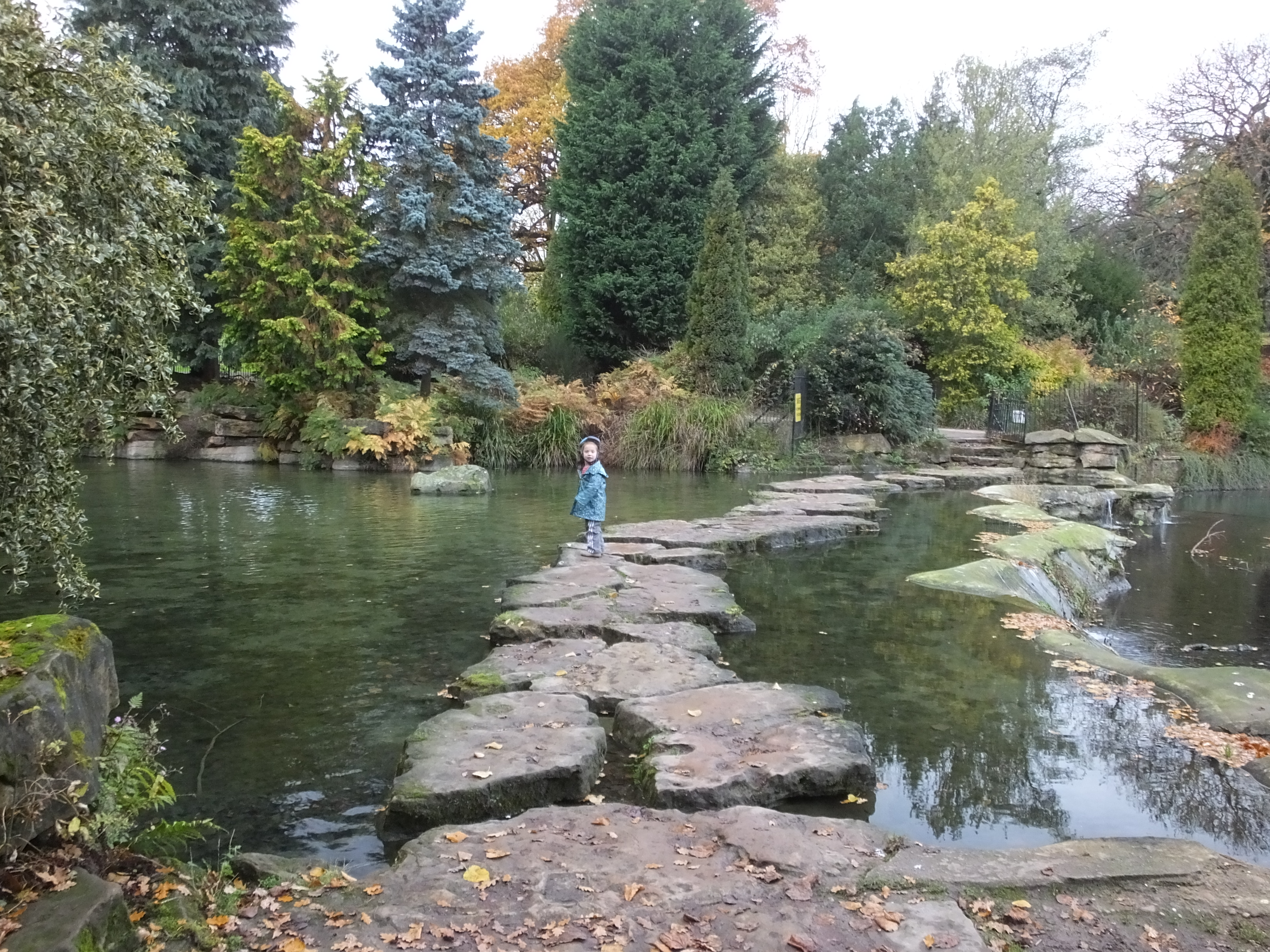
The stepping stones

To the east, is a lake side terrace and the D. H. Lawrence pavilion with the normal children's play equipment nearby. In the sandstone outcrop there are caves. When the park was remodelled in 1921, formal gates were constructed to the south of the lake creating a visual axis to the neighbouring Trent building on the escarpment in University Park. The gates are grand, with sentinel eagle sculptures on the piers. An ornamental bridge spans the brook, and steps lead from the lake side terrace to the lake. Here one finds two Chinese stone lion sculptures presented to Nottingham by the city of Ningbo. To the south of the lake was extensive planting including the azalea collection and many trees that are suitable for climbing. These have been neglected and plans have been made, and are now funded, for restoration.

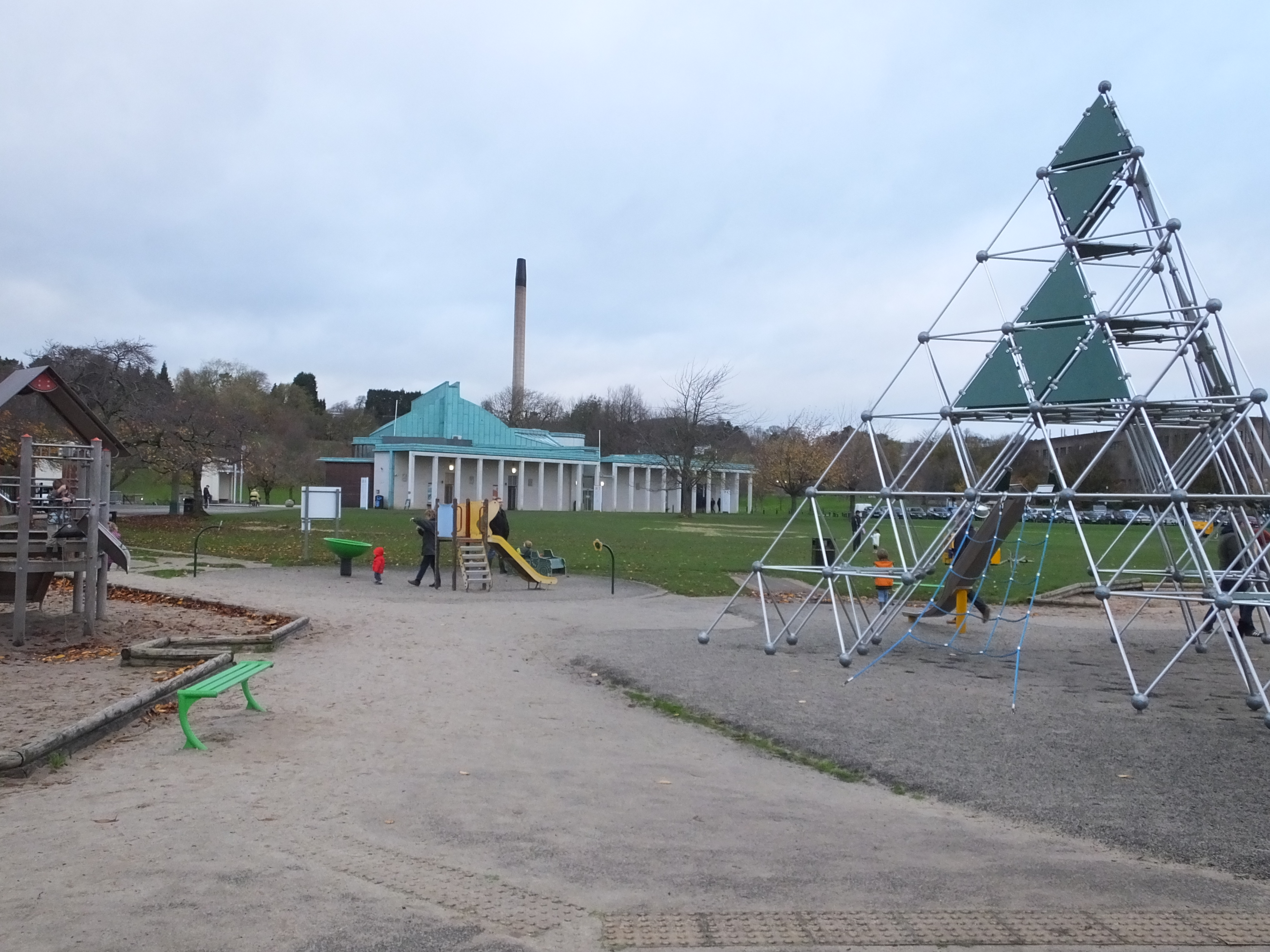

On the exterior there was a circular paddling pool, croquet lawns and bowling greens. The paddling pool, has gone (November 2015), but the bowlings greens are in use as three croquet lawns complementing the five original croquet lawns. The azalea walk is to be re-established (November 2015) through the Lottery Fund grant. The Maid Marion motor launch was restored in 2000, but is off the lake until more silt has been removed.

=== Wildlife ===
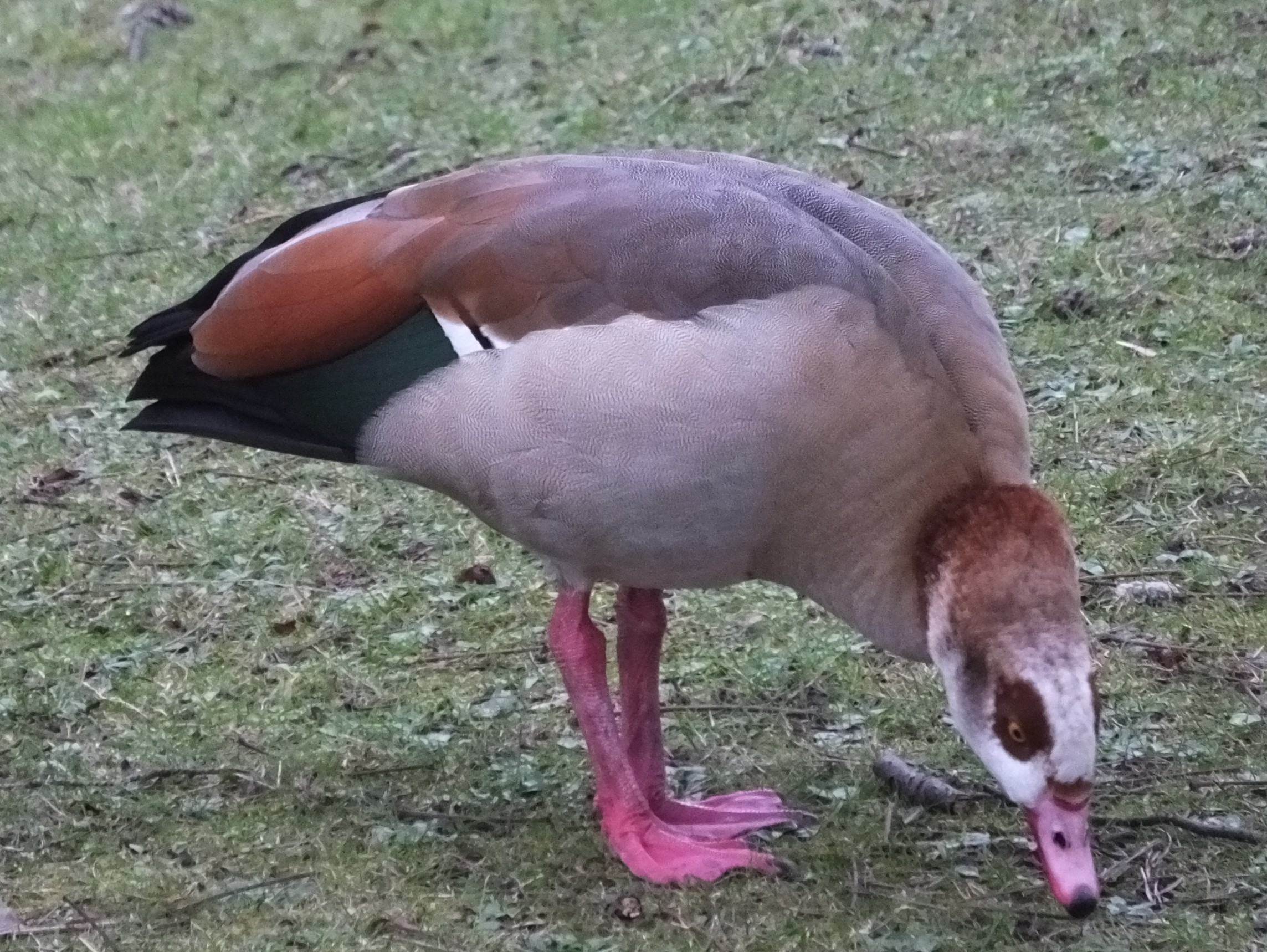
Egyptian goose(m) in Highfields Park 2016.

On the lake there are rails such as moorhen and coots and ducks such as tufted ducks and mallards. There are Canada geese and a pair of feral Egyptian geese who in February 2016 hatched four goslings. The lake was used by Severn Trent Water as a fish hatchery, so angling was not permitted.

=== Highfields lakeside pavilion ===
The original Lake pavilion was destroyed by fire in 1999, and couldn't be saved. It was replaced by the D H Lawrence pavilion in 2001. It contains a theatre, gallery hosting exhibitions of archives and rare books from Manuscripts and Special Collections, and a café. It is leased to the University of Nottingham.

=== Maid Marion ===
A wooden motor launch that took and will take visitors round the lake once the lake has been de-silted.

=== Highfields Paddling Pool ===
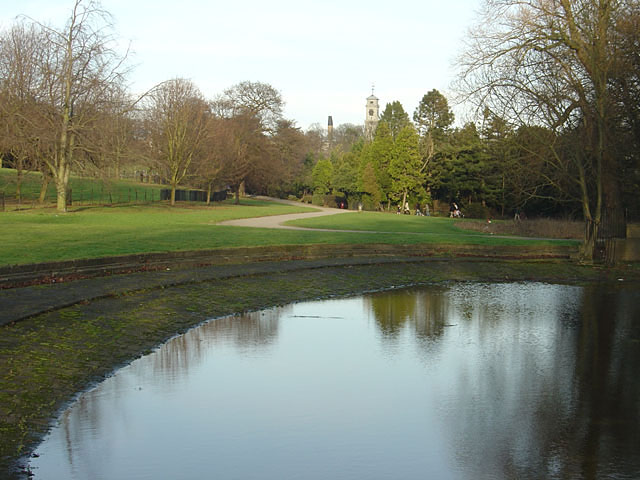
The former Highfields paddling pool in 2008 after rain.

The famous round paddling pool will not be restored, 52.93293°N 1.20171°W it has been closed since before 1986 for reasons of hygiene. Local wags suggested that letting children play in the lake for 20 minutes would inoculate them against all known diseases

=== Highfields Lido ===
The Highfields Lido (1922-1981) 52.93863°N 1.18789°W was the first to open in Nottingham, before Bulwell and Carrington. It was the largest lido in the country, the pool was 330 by 75 feet (101 m × 23 m), holding 750,000 imperial gallons (3,400,000 L) of water. It was fed by a pipe from the boating lake and discharged into the Tottle Brook. It was drained and refilled once a week, on a Sunday when it was closed to the public. Nottingham City Council took control in 1932 and installed a filtration and circulation plant. Between 1932 and 1951 attempts were made to heat the water but this was not successful. It closed in 1981 and was demolished. The site was obtained by the university and is now a concert hall and offices.

The lido was designed by Percy Richard Morley Horder who drew on the Roman style of architecture. He used red brick walling and pantile roofing and incorporated archways in front of the changing cubicles to break up the line of the buildings. Though it had a massive surface of water, it was short of terrace space for relaxing. In the late 1930s a sun-deck was built that spanned the basin, this caused problems with the filtration, and it was removed in the 1950s. In 1963 after 17 years of debate, 2,300 square yards (1,900 m^{2}) was bought to extend the terrace and provide a paddling pool. This was built at southern end.
