= Percy Richard Morley Horder =

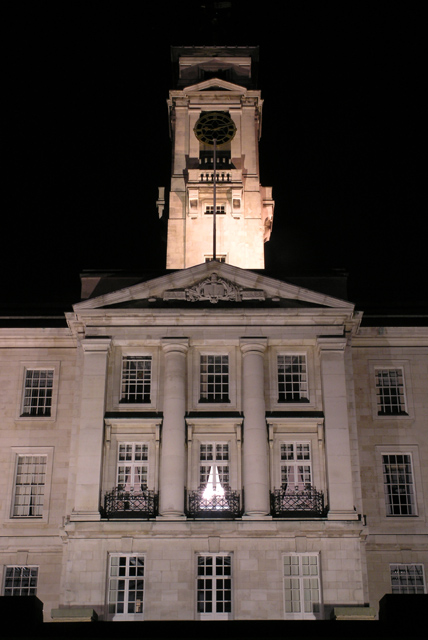
- University of Nottingham, Trent Building at night
- Born: 1870; Torquay
- Died: 1944 (aged 73–74); Dartford, Kent
- Education: City of London School. Articled to Devey and Williams.
- Occupation: Architect
- Practice: Williams and Morley Horder 1895 Morley Horder and Briant Alfred Poulter, 1919–1925. Morley Horder and Verner Owen Rees, 1925–1929.
- Buildings: Trent Building, Nottingham University.
- Projects: Shops for Boots the Chemist

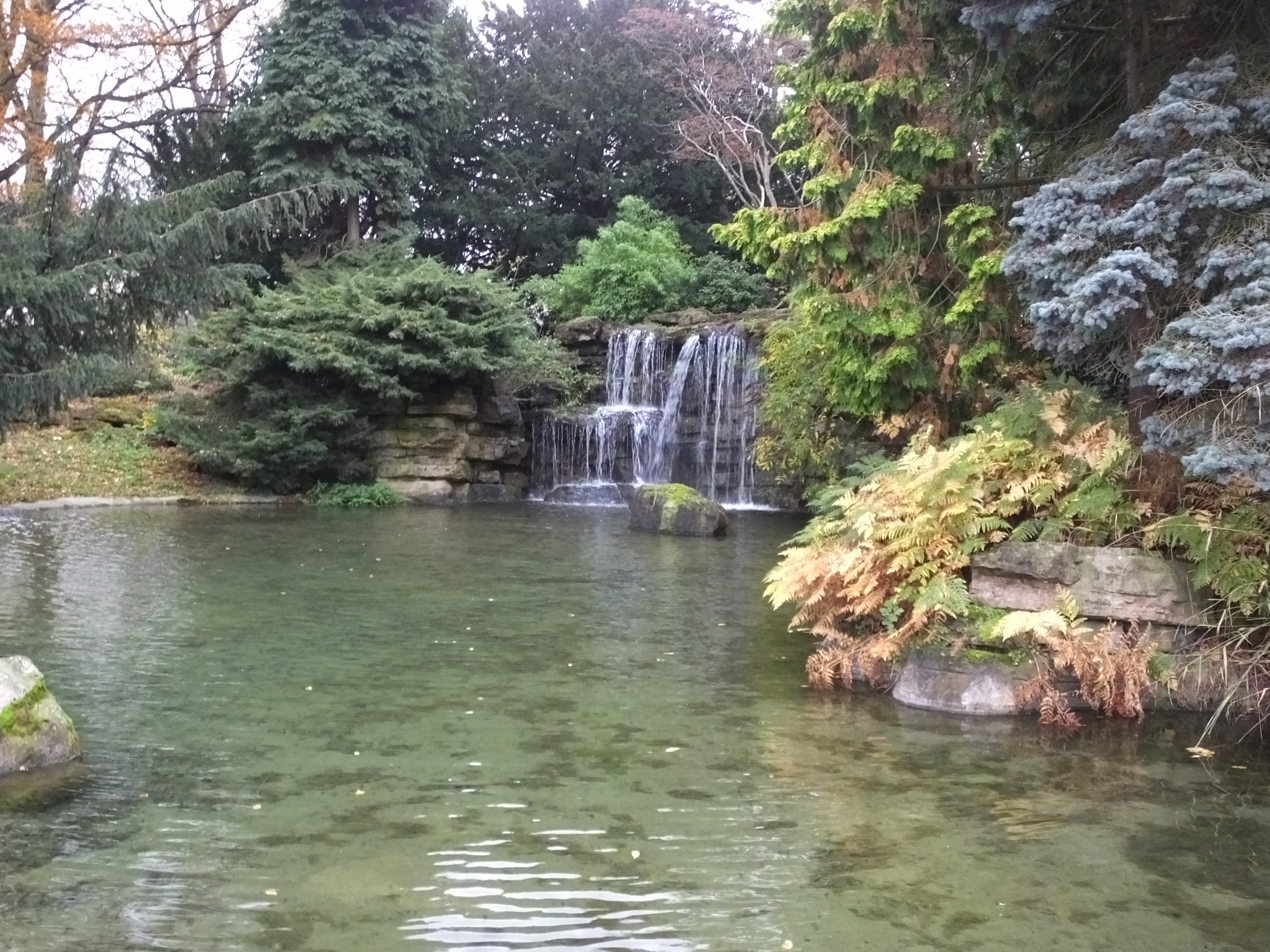
Highfields Park, Nottingham Cascade

Percy Richard Morley Horder (18 November 1870 – 7 October 1944) was an English architect who early in his career worked from offices in Stroud and later in London. His early work was in the Arts and Crafts style, but after the First World War his buildings were increasingly in the Neo-Georgian fashion. His work included public houses for the Godsell Brewery and designing new country houses or partially rebuilding existing houses. He also designed country-house gardens and is noted for laying out Highfields Park, Nottingham together with the adjacent Nottingham University Campus. He undertook architectural work in many parts of the British Isles including Ireland. He is probably best remembered for the Trent Building in the University of Nottingham. and for design of the London School of Hygiene and Tropical Medicine. His work at Upton House, Warwickshire for Viscount Bearsted is notable, but it is his work for Jesse Boot, both the Boots the Chemists stores, but most importantly the Trent Building and the laying out the campuses of the University of Nottingham, which influenced design at other English universities, for which he must take the greatest credit.

== Biography ==
He was born in Torquay, the son of the Congregationalist minister William Garrett Horder but later the family moved to Tottenham, London. He married Rosa Catherine (Katie) Apperly in 1897, the only daughter of Ebeneezer Apperley, a Stroud, Gloucestershire cloth manufacturer. The Horder family lived at 6 (now 18) Hamilton Terrace, St John's Wood and their daughter Barbara Morley Horder (1898–1986) became a noted actress.

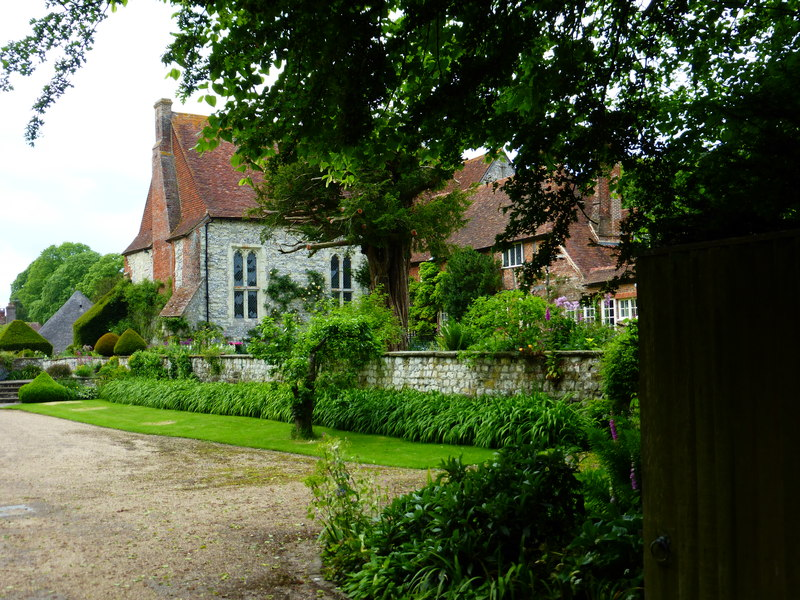
Court House, East Meon

In 1927 Morley Horder acquired the Court House at East Meon in Hampshire. This was a country residence of the bishops of Winchester. It was in a badly dilapidated state and he set about restoring the building. Of this residence, the great hall, a solar, and a garderobe block survive largely intact. The Court House is remarkable for its fine state of preservation. It was commissioned by the bishop, William of Wykeham and built by his master mason William Wynford, one of the greatest of 14th-century architects, who remodelled the nave of Winchester Cathedral and designed Winchester College and New College, Oxford. Morley Horder added a north wing, joining the medieval house to the 18th-century thatched cottage on the roadside, and he laid out the gardens between the house and the 18th-century thatched barn on what had become a farmyard. Morley Horder also bought and restored a number of thatched cottages in the village. An account of Morley Horder's restoration work is given in a Country Life article.

Horder appears to have been eccentric, with a domineering character: "To his pupils he was "Holy Murder" (a Spoonerism on his name); according to his daughter, "he was most charming... and most awful"... "pushing artistic temperament to its limits, [he] looked and behaved like a cantankerous Old Testament prophet."

== Architectural work ==
=== Churches and chapels ===
- St Andrew's Mission Church, Gravesham (now St Andrews Arts Centre) renovated and adjoining Mission House "erected to his plans"(1891)
- Willesden Congregational Church - interior of church rearranged and redecorated - described as Architect to London Congregational Union.(1893)
- Queen's Avenue Congregational Church, Muswell Hill (1897–1900). According to Cherry and Pevsner, "Nicely detailed, Perpendicular…roughcast with stone dressings. Handsome inside with piers without capitals, broad barrel-vaulted roof, and galleried transepts."
- Fetter Lane Congregational Chapel, Langthorne Road, Leyton (1899). Arts and Crafts style; Grade II Listed.
- Trinity Congregational Chapel, Lauriston Road, Hackney (1901). Red brick and sandstone in a late Gothic style.
- Congregational Church, High Street, (Bushey, Hertfordshire (1904). Now a theatre.
- Ealing Green Congregational Church (1911).
- Penge Congregational Church (1911–1912).
- Brondesbury Park Congregational Church (1911).
- Westfield College Chapel, Camden (1928–9). Rendered with deep eaves and small rectangular windows high up lighting an austere but well proportioned interior. Doric porch leads into a foyer at gallery level, from which two flights of stairs descend.

=== University and college buildings ===
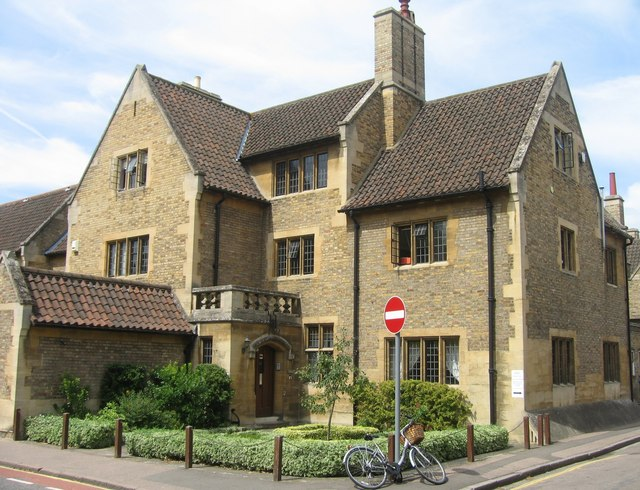
Former Cheshunt College in Cambridge

- Cheshunt (Congregational) College, Bateman Street, Cambridge (1913–4). Later combined with Westminster College. Free Tudor style. Main range with square central porch-tower. and two symmetrical bay winds. Pale brick with buff stone dressings. Now the provincial Grand Lodge of the Freemasons.

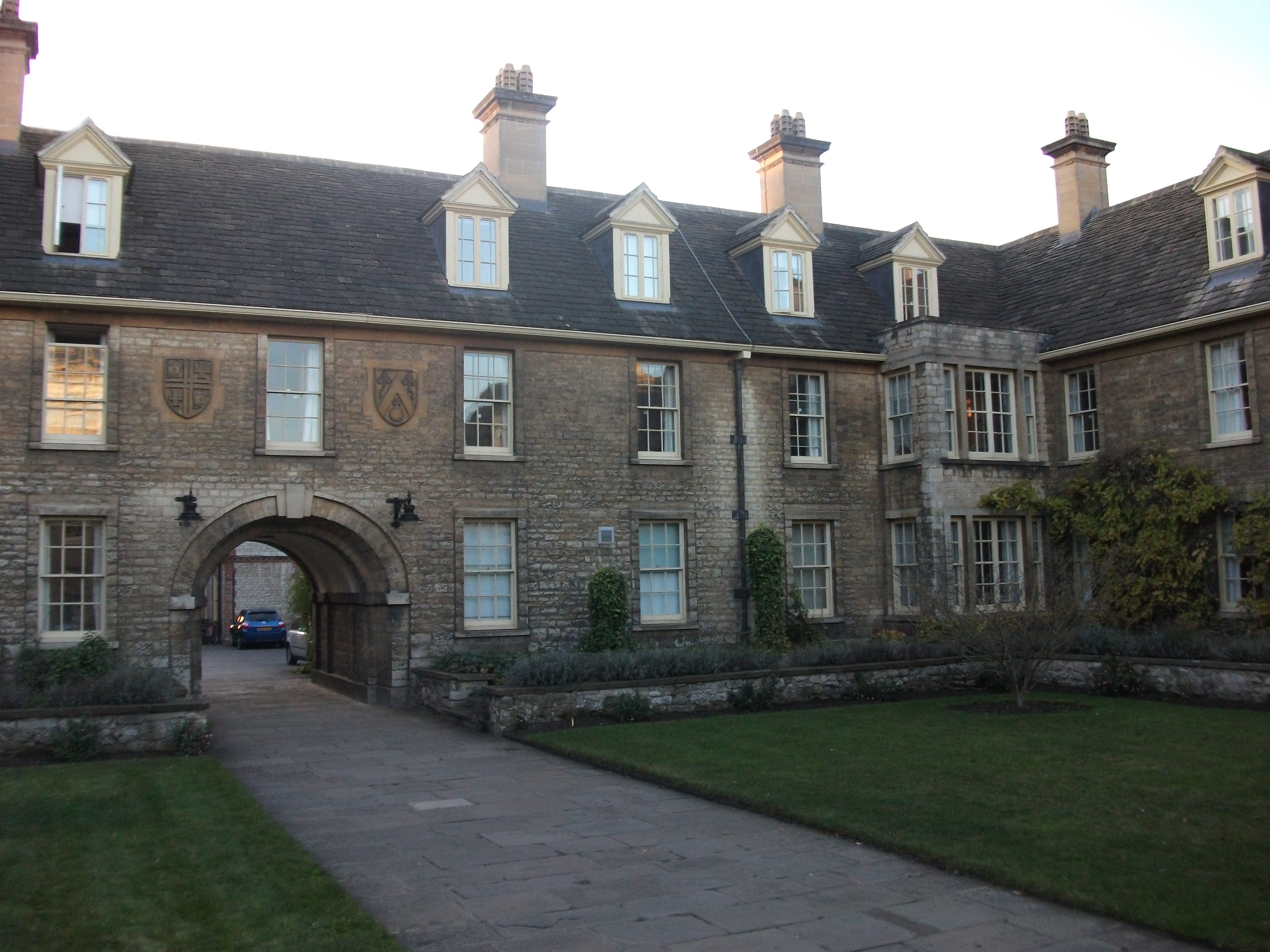
Somerville College, Oxford - Darbishire Quad

- Chapel Court, Jesus College, Cambridge.

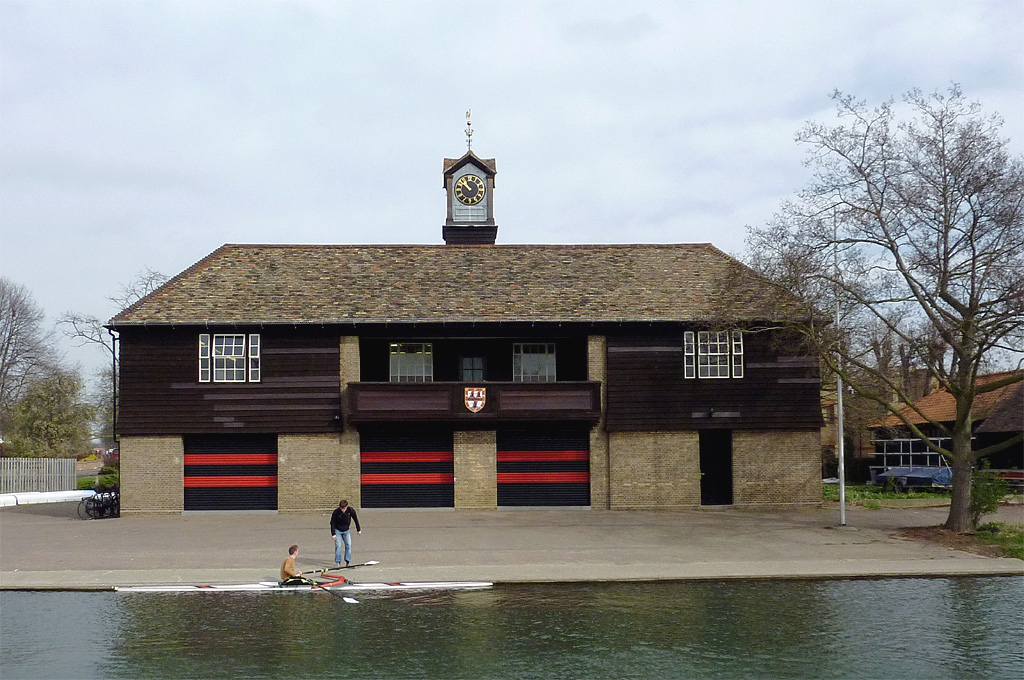
Jesus College boathouse 1932

- Jesus College, Cambridge boathouse. The boathouse was designed by Morley Horder, and was built in 1932 to replace the Victorian structure destroyed by fire in September of that year. The roof is hipped, with a central clock tower topped by a weathervane. The roof tiles are said to have come from old farm buildings owned by the college. The first floor has a central balcony with a timber balustrade displaying the college crest.
- Darbishire Quad, Somerville College, Oxford (1934). Morley Horder was commissioned to build a quadrangle and the porters' lodge and the New Council Room were constructed at the entrance to the quad, which housed undergraduate and fellows' rooms.

==== London School of Hygiene & Tropical Medicine ====
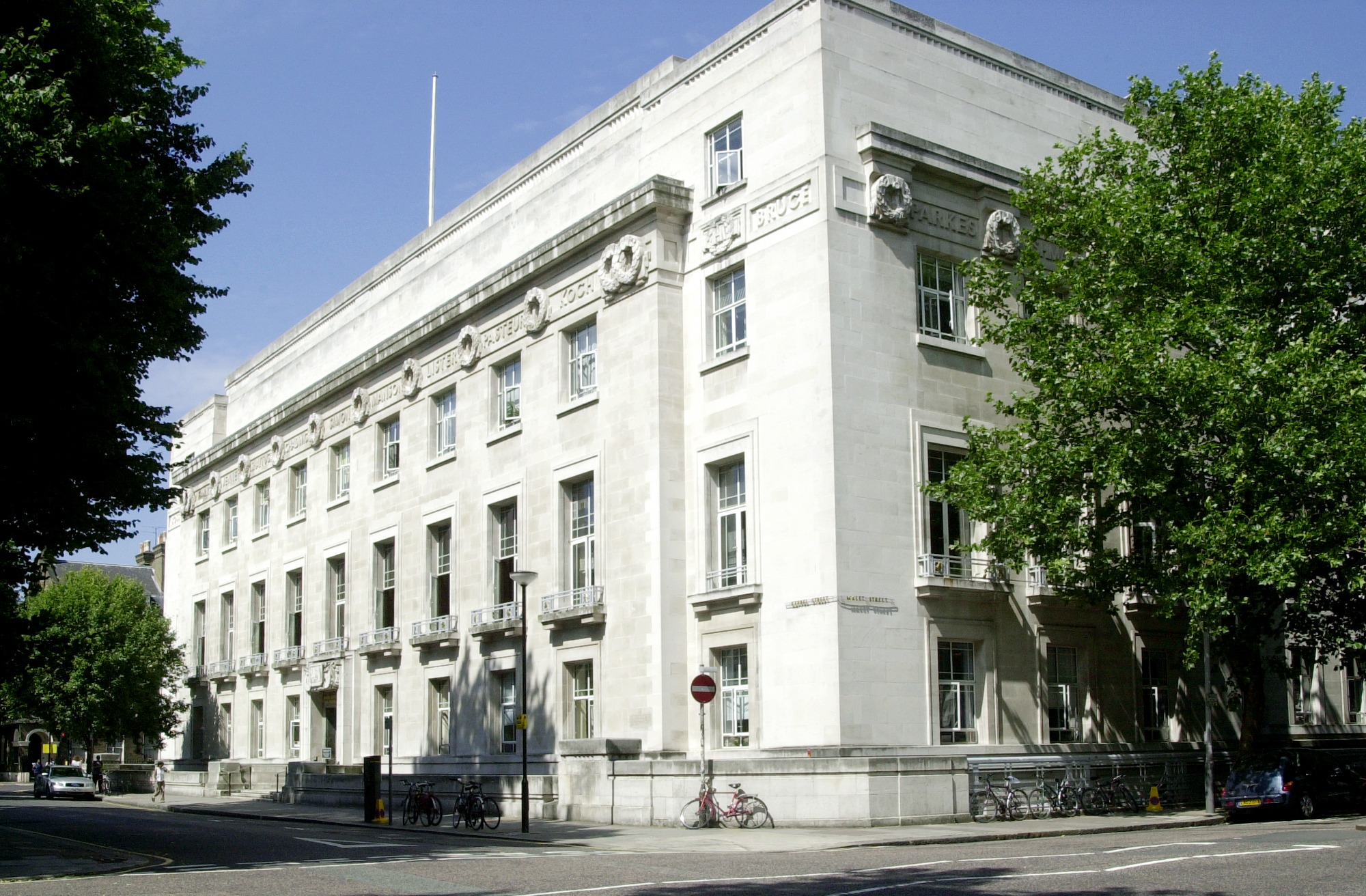
London School of Hygiene & Tropical Medicine building

- London School of Hygiene & Tropical Medicine (with Verner Owen Rees; 1926–28). A competition to design a new building to be sited in Gower Street was held involving five architects, all experienced in laboratory design and construction. This was won in 1925 by Morley Horder and Verner Rees who located the main entrance in Keppel Street. Minimally decorated classical or Neo-Georgian facade of four storeys in meticulously cut Portland stone. Austerely detailed, with large wreaths and names of medical scientists in relief. The iron balconies have delicately gilded tropical flora and fauna. The building was opened in 1929 by the Prince of Wales. The purchase of the site and the cost of a new building was made possible through a gift of $2m from the Rockefeller Foundation.

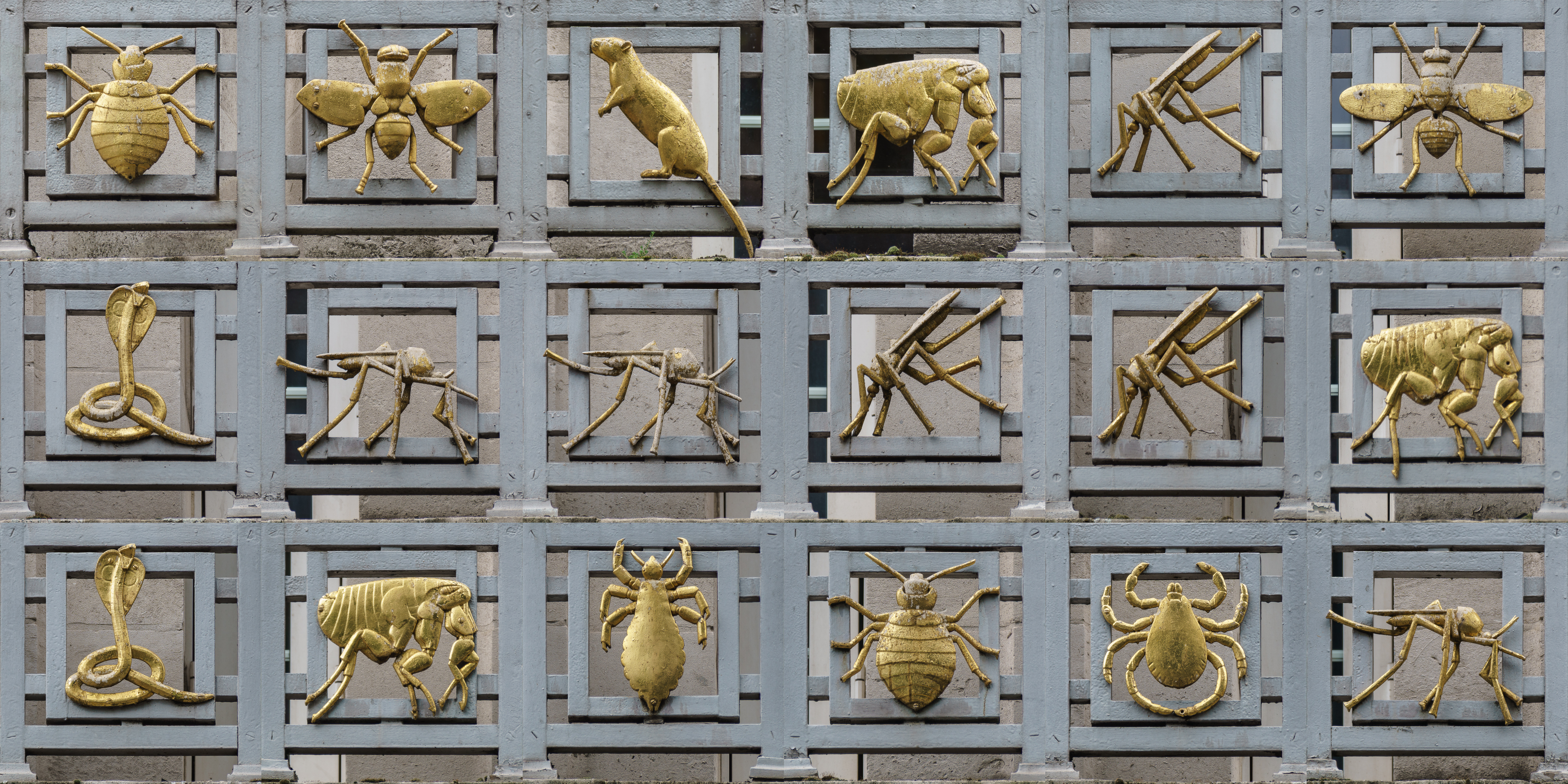
Gilded vectors of disease, on balcony designed by Morley Horder

=== Orphanage ===
- Gyde Orphanage, Painswick, Gloucestershire (1915–18).

=== Public buildings ===
- Village Hall, Pitsford, Northamptonshire. Tudor in style.
- Christ Church Parish Hall, Turnham Green Chiswick circa 1914.

=== Country and town houses ===
Ard Na Sidhe Country House, Carragh Lake, Killorglin, Co. Kerry, Ireland (1913) https://www.ardnasidhe.com/history

=== New houses ===
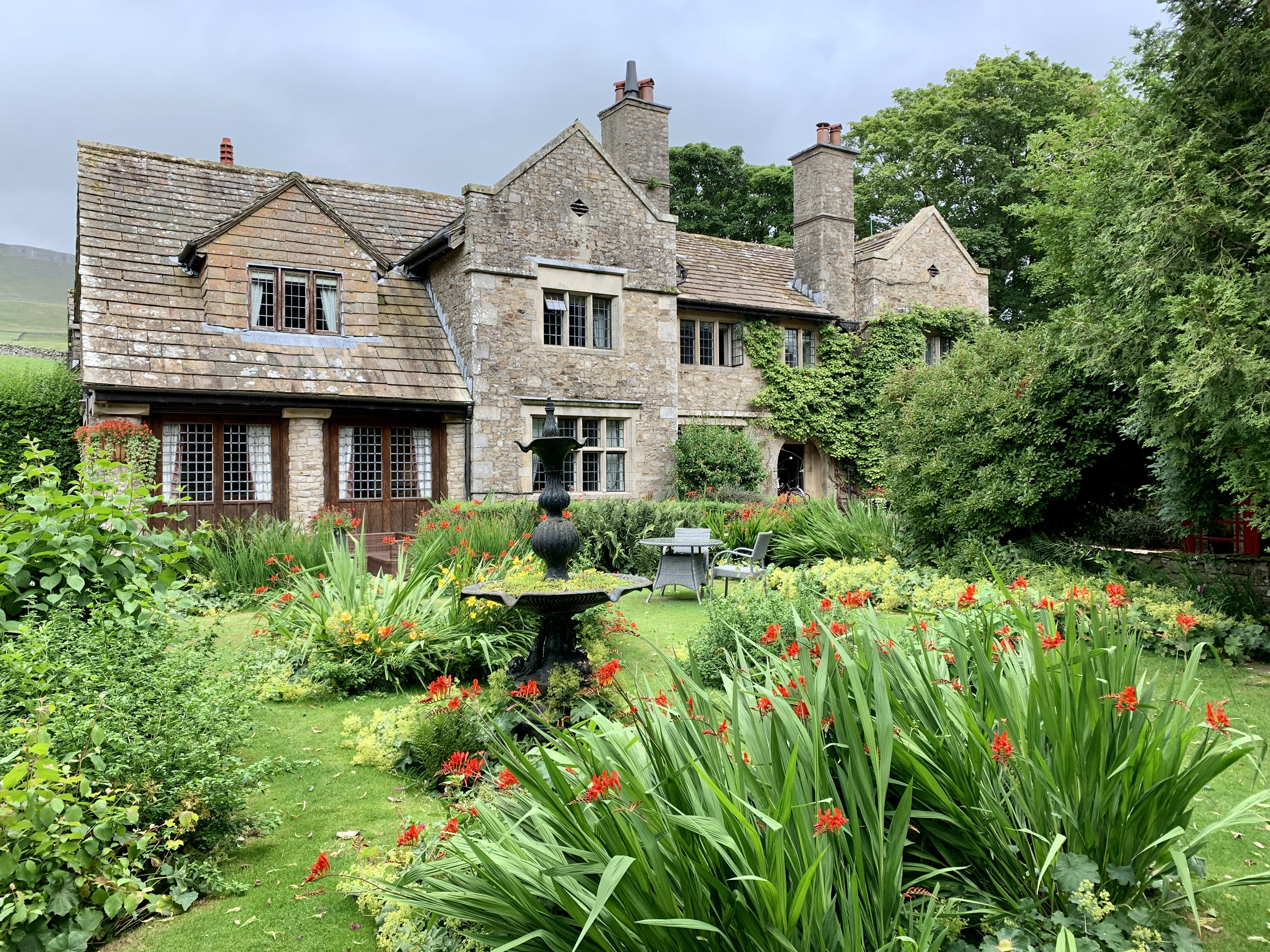
Stone House, Hawes, North Yorkshire

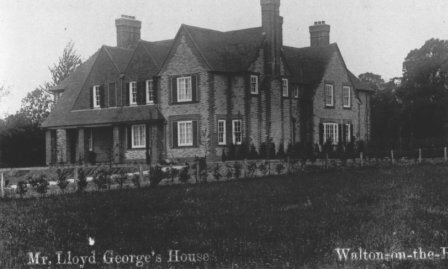
Pinfold Manor, Walton on the Hill, Banstead, Surrey

- Hill Wooton House, Hill Wooton, Warwick (1893)
- Inglewood, Brimscombe, Stroud, now converted into two dwellings known as 163/165 Thrupp Lane, (1895)
- 52-54 Brook Street, London (1896–7).
- Birchington House, Little Common, Bexhill on Sea (1899)
- Moonhill, Cuckfield, Surrey (1902). In Arts and Crafts style.
- Letchworth Cheap Cottages Exhibition stated to be "author of several of the designs"(1905).
- Greystock in Warwick (1905).
- A Cottage at Upper Warlingham Surrey (1905).
- Apple Porch Maidenhead (1906)
- Stone House, Sedbergh-Askrigg Road, High Abbotside, Richmond, North Yorkshire (1909) for Hugh Arden Crallan (1867- 1929)
- Inverleith, Lime Tree Road Norwich (1908-1909)
- Little Court, Charminster, Dorset Detached house in grounds (1909)
- 2 Cottages at Mayhill/Townhill Swansea (1910)- winner of a South Wales Cottage Exhibition Award.
- Pinfold Manor, Walton on the Hill, Banstead, Surrey (1912–13) Designed for David Lloyd George, then a Cabinet Minister later Prime Minister
- Cotsmoor, Private Road Rodborough Common (now divided into three properties known as Rodborough Crest, Endover and Curtal) Designed for Charles Apperly, a nephew of Horder's wife Katie. The original gardens extended to the coach house and now contain two new properties Fair Mount and Wychwood(1911)
- Mallory Court, Bishop's Tachbrook, Warwickshire (1914). The site was part of an estate owned by the who sold c.9 acres (c 3.5ha) to James Thomas Holt, a retired cotton-bleacher from Manchester. Plans for a house by Percy Morley Horder (1870–1944) dated May 1914 were submitted and approved in June 1914, and construction appears to have begun almost immediately. The new house was occupied in 1916. While Horder's plans do not show details of the proposed gardens, the elevations, which were also submitted for approval, show the principal garden compartments as realised, together with the formal garden to the south of the house in broadly the form which was implemented. The Garden is listed Grade II
- Periton Mead Manor House, Somerset (1915–1922).

==== Filkins, Oxfordshire: council housing (1929–?1935) ====
Morley Horder worked with the Labour politician and landowner Sir Stafford Cripps and the local stonemason George Swynford on the provision of council housing in the village of Filkins. Cripps insisted that the new buildings should be of stone and stylistically in keeping with local vernacular traditions, meeting the difference in cost for the council housing, re-opening quarries on his own land to provide building. This was recorded in Country Life. As a result, by 1944 Filkins was being hailed as 'a modernised village' and 'an illustration of contemporary village planning', in an article in Country Life by Christopher Hussey.

=== Historic houses that have been added to or extensively rebuilt. ===
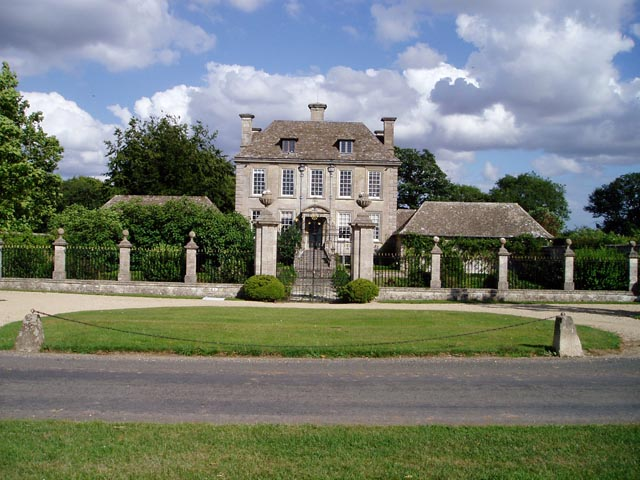
Nether Lypiatt Manor

- Rodborough Court, Rodborough, Gloucestershire (1899). The house was extended to the north-east in 1899 by Morley Horder and apparently increased in height.
- Otley Hall, Suffolk. Dated to 1512 and home of the Gosnold family until 1674 was not altered apart from minor works in 1600 until Horder made additions and alterations in 1910-11 including a new entrance on the S side through the stair turret and addition of a small extension at the south end of the south wing, as well as removing some of the external plaster and rebuilding the chimney tops.
- Nether Lypiatt Manor, Gloucestershire. Built in 1702–1705 by an unknown architect for Judge John Coxe, with one wing added in 1931 by Horder, the small house forms a perfect square of 46 feet (14 m) on each side, with sash windows, tall chimneys, hipped roofs and gate piers and railings. The attic storey with dormers was removed in 1844, but replaced by Horder c. 1923.
- Rockbeare House, Devon.
- Steeple Manor

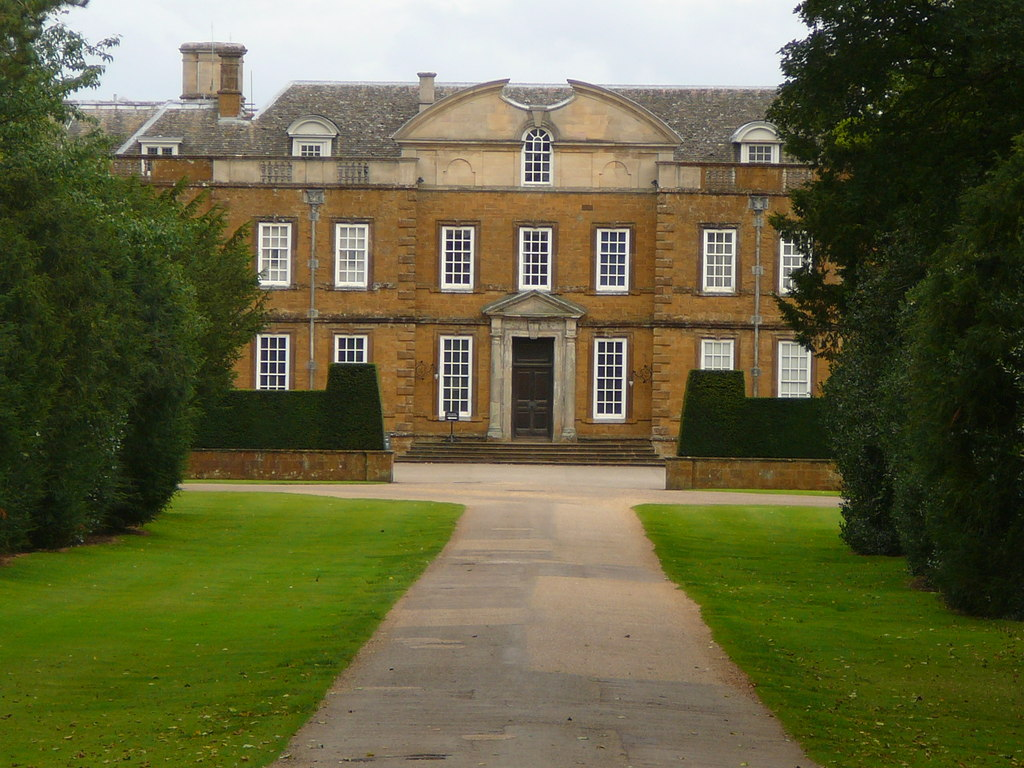
Upton House (National Trust) - The main entrance

- Upton House, Warwickshire (1927–28). The original house dates from 1695. In 1927 the house was acquired by Walter Samuel, 2nd Viscount Bearsted, whose father was the founder of Shell Transport & Trading. Lord Bearsted commissioned Morley Horder to make alterations to house. The house with gardens and art collection were donated to the National Trust in 1948. Horder extensively rebuilt the house and the segmented pediment over the entrance is Horder's work. Horder added the art gallery and the interior of the house is largely designed by Horder.
- Pursers, Woodlands, West Meon, Hampshire. 17th century farmhouse extended to north, south, east and west. Substantial wings by Morley Horder (1902), with new stable block, and archway lodge house over carriage drive. Main house since subdivided into three separate properties. Pursers later became the home of Lord Northbrook in 1930, and was extended further, with wings designed by Francis Hayward Floyd of Newbury.
- Winwick Manor House, Winwick, Northamptonshire (1926 & 1937). Elizabethan house, brick with stone dressings with a large extension to the south-east designed by P.H. Morley-Horder in 1926, keeping with the style of the original building, and a further extension in 1937.
- South Barn, Southcliffe Road, Swanage, Dorset. (1937). An 18th-century house that was virtually re-built by Morley Horder.
- Waterston Manor, Puddletown, Dorset.

=== Work for Jesse Boot (Lord Trent) ===
Through his friendship with Sir Jesse Boot he obtained the commission to design the buildings at University College, Nottingham from 1922 to 1928. This included the Highfields Park, the Highfields Lido and the Trent Building.

=== Shops for Boots the Chemist ===
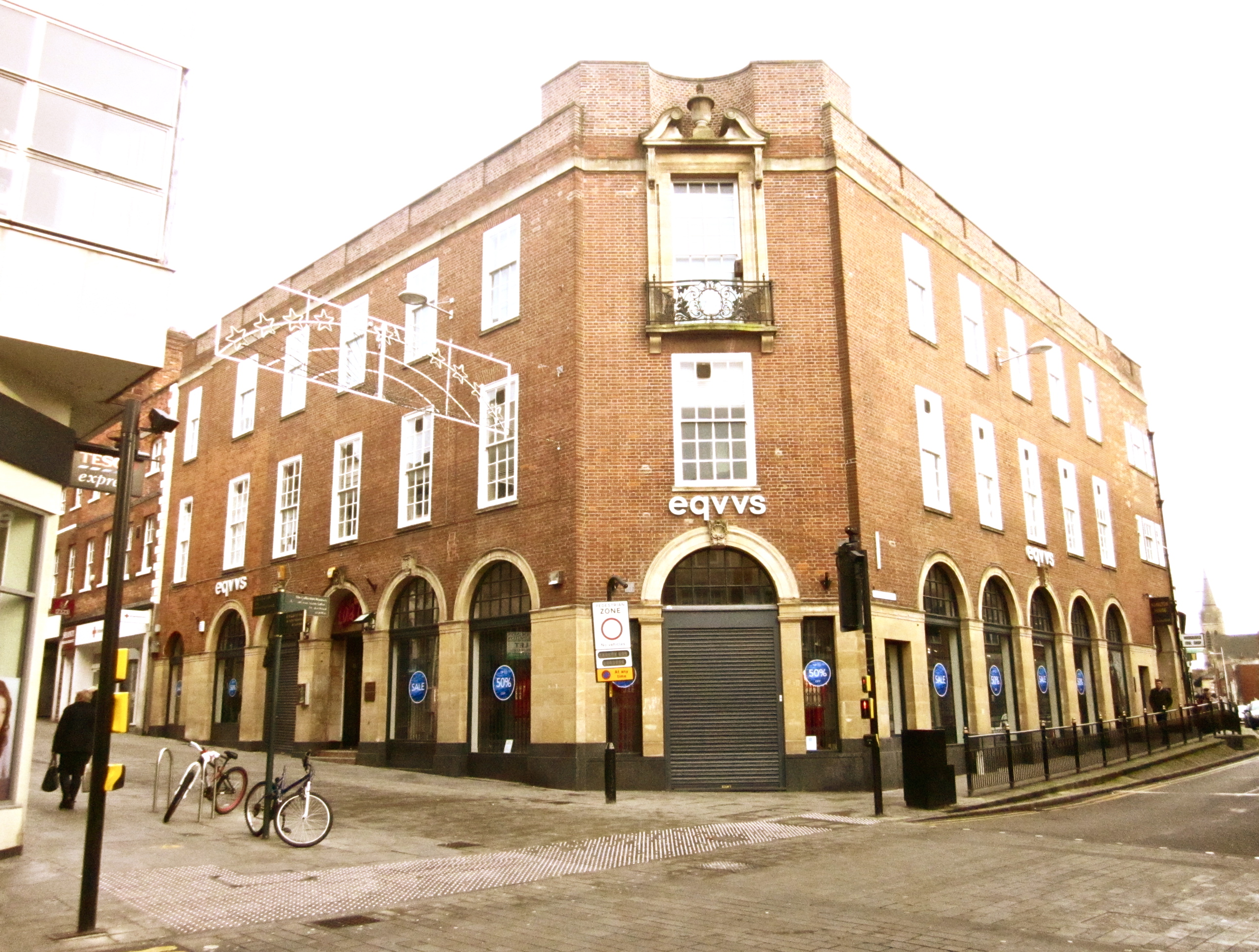
Boots, High Street, Lincoln 1924

- Bristol 9-10 Wine Street (1916)
- Eastbourne (1917)
- Lincoln (1924) Replaced an earlier Boots store on this site of 1884 which with Sheffield were the first outside Nottingham. The 1924 building represents the change in Boots architecture from Elizabethan Revival to Neo-Georgian. Brick faced with three storeys. One bay facing towards the road junction and seven bays on both road facades, with arcading at ground floor level. Use of the new Boots script logo. The store closed in July 1973 with the opening of a new store at 311-12 High Street.
- Windsor
- Regent Street, London

Also: Derby, corner of St Peter's Street and East Street - built 1912 and featuring statuary and pargetting. Not occupied by Boots since the mid-1970s.

=== Public houses ===
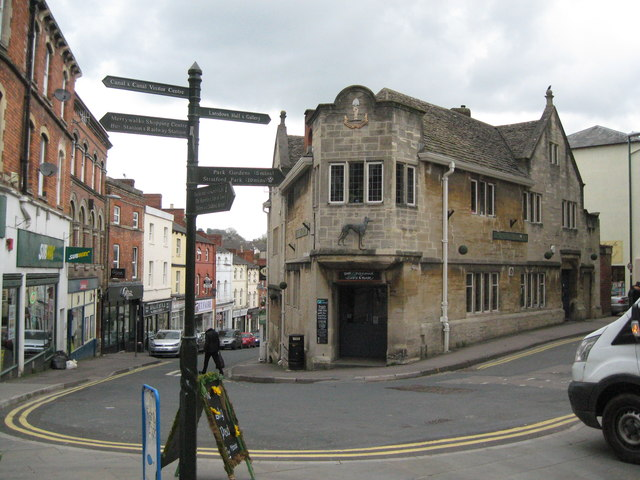
Former Greyhound in Stroud, Gloucestershire

Early in his career Morley Horder had a Stroud office and he undertook work for Godsells & Sons Brewery. The brewery was taken over by the Stroud Brewery in 1928.

- The Greyhound, Gloucester Street, Stroud (1903). It was rebuilt by Godsells & Sons in 1903, and was designed in the Arts and Crafts style. It was eventually closed as a pub in 2010; it has since reopened as a licensed cafe bar. It is a notable example of his pub architecture
- The Clothiers Arms, Bath Road, Rodborough, Stroud (1909)
- The Prince Albert, Rodborough Hill, Rodborough, Stroud (1912)

=== Talks and articles ===
Morley Horder regularly wrote on architectural matters and gave talks

- Use and Beauty: Or the Influence of our surroundings Talk 17 December 1891 at St Andrews Mission School Room where he had been architect summarised in Gravesend Reporter Article.
- The Modern House with limelight talk with illustrations Ealing Green Literary and Musical Society Monday 16 November 1896
- Architecture - "A profession or an art" 2 page article in The Magazine of Art

"In so far as the architect falls short of the ideal of the painter and of the sculptor, or ceases to have an ideal beyond more bricks and mortar, he is not worthy of the name architect; but in the measure that he seeks to make the richest cathedral or mansion, or the humblest homes of the people suitable and materially beautiful, he has become a benefactor of many men and times, and is indeed an artist of the beautiful."

- Letchworth Cheap Cottages Exhibition 1905 Catalogue Article on Cottage Architecture.

== Literature ==
- Brodie A. (ed), Directory of British Architects, 1834–1914: 2 Vols, British Architectural Library, Royal Institute of British Architects, 2001. pp. 211–212.
- Gray A. Stuart(1985), Edwardian Architecture, pp. 214–5.
- Kathryn A. Morrison, (2003) English Shops & Shopping, Yale University Press.(for Boot's architecture.)
- Whyte Wiilliam (2015) Redbrick A social and architectural history of Britain's civic universities Oxford University Press ISBN 9780198716129
