= Penge Congregational Church =

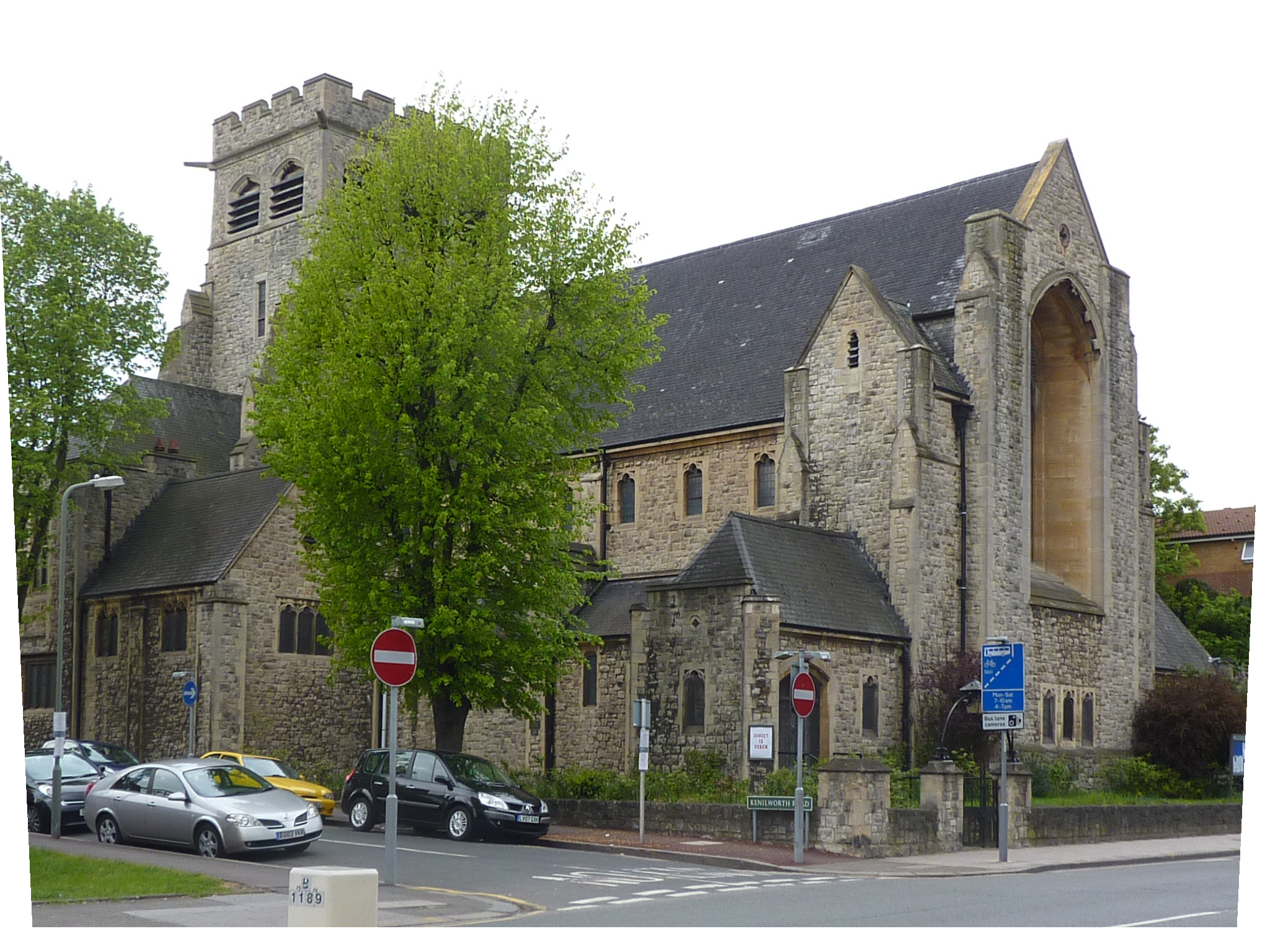
- Viewed from Penge High Street / Beckenham Road

General information
- Architectural style: Romanesque Revival architecture
- Location: 172 High St, Penge, London SE20 7QS www.pengecongregational.com, England
- Coordinates: 51°24′43″N 0°3′1″W
- Construction started: 1911
- Completed: 1912
- Client: Congregational Church

Technical details
- Structural system: Ragstone masonry

Design and construction
- Architect: Percy Richard Morley Horder

Listed Building – Grade II
- Designated: 15 May 1996
- Reference no.: 1268472

Penge Congregational Church is a Congregational church in Penge in the London Borough of Bromley located on Penge High Street. It is organised under Congregational principles for all who believe in Jesus and is run under a basis of fellowship that includes all members of the church.

The building was constructed in 1911–1912 to designs by Percy Richard Morley Horder "with passage aisles and clerestory. Shafts on large, excellently carved corbels." The structure appears fortress-like in its Romanesque Revival architectural style massing. It is Grade II listed.

The church currently is in-between Ministers (in an interregnum) but the current Associate Minister is Pam Owen. Sunday Services are at 10:30 a.m. and 6:30 p.m.

Penge Congregational Church is part of the Congregational Federation.

== See also ==
- St John the Evangelist, Penge
