= Mary Phillips (suffragette) =

English suffragette (1880–1969)

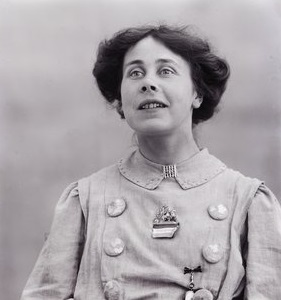
- Born: Mary Elizabeth Phillips; 15 July 1880; St Mary Bourne, England
- Died: 21 June 1969 (aged 88); Hove, Sussex, England
- Other names: Mary Pederson, Mary Paterson
- Occupation: Activist

Mary Elizabeth Phillips (15 July 1880 – 21 June 1969) was an English suffragette, feminist and socialist. She was the longest prison serving suffragette. She worked for Christabel Pankhurst but was sacked; she then worked for Sylvia Pankhurst as Mary Pederson or Mary Paterson. In later life she supported women's and children's organisations.

== Early life ==
Mary Elizabeth Phillips was born in St. Mary Bourne, Hampshire, the daughter of William Fleming Phillips and Louisa Elizabeth (Simms) Phillips. Her father was a doctor who worked in Glasgow.

== Suffrage activism ==
Phillips was encouraged by her father to campaign for women's rights and in 1904 she became a paid official of the Glasgow and West of Scotland Association for Women's Suffrage. She later reported that this taught her that quiet campaigning was not going to be sufficient and she joined the more radical Women's Social & Political Union in 1907 and established a Glasgow branch of the WSPU. She wrote articles for Forward which was the journal of the Glasgow Independent Labour Party. Phillips assisted Helen Fraser with campaigns for the movement in East Fife.

Her next WSPU campaign was in the West of England organising visit plans with Annie Kenney, Elsie Howey, Gladice Keevil, Clara Codd and later was on the platform, speaking in Plymouth in November 1908 with Annie Kenney and Mary Blathwayt.

In March 1908 she had been sentenced to six weeks in Holloway Prison following a demonstration outside the House of Commons. As part of another delegation in June 1908, with Emmeline Pankhurst, twelve women including Emmeline Pethick-Lawrence, Jessie Stephenson, Florence Haig, Maud Joachim and Phillips were turned away from an arranged visit to the Prime Minister on 30 June 1908 and a crowd of supporters tried to rush through a police line who responded with physical force, resulting in a further arrest and 3-month sentence, making Phillips the longest serving suffragette prisoner. A postcard picture of a suffragette being arrested by police is said to be of Phillips.

When Phillips was released from prison she was welcomed by Flora Drummond, bagpipes and other suffragettes who posed in tartan for a picture under the slogan "Ye Mauna Tramp on the Scotch Thistle Laddie". The Scottish suffragettes present compared their struggle to the campaign of William Wallace.

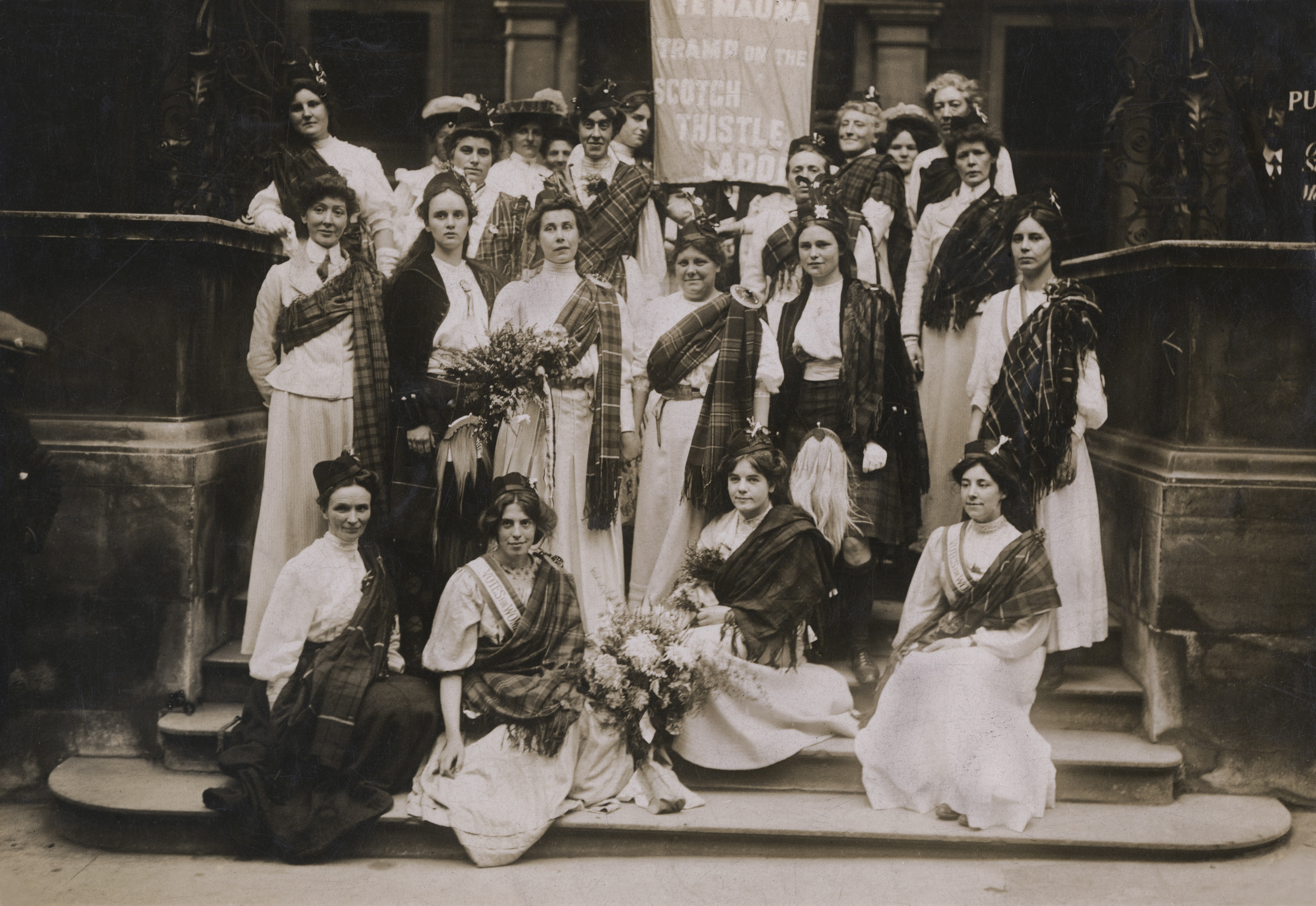
Mary Phillips (3rd from left) welcomed by suffragettes wearing tartan sashes:"Ye Mauna Tramp on the Scotch Thistle Laddie"

Phillips showed other suffragettes different forms of protest, including getting Charlie Marsh to help her pavement chalking in Lambeth, whom Philips noted 'gamely stood the jeering and rough handling' the women got in the process. Her next location from January 1909, was in Newcastle and then back south to Cornwall and Devon. She was among the welcoming party for another released prisoner Emmeline Pethick-Lawrence, in April 1909, with the Pankhursts, two Kenney sisters, Vera Wentworth, Minnie Baldock and Mary Gawthorpe. They were taken to join 500 suffragettes at a celebration lunch at the Criterion, Picadilly Circus restaurant. Phillips was arrested later in 1909 again with Vera Wentworth and Elsie Howie for attempting to force their attendance at a men's meeting in Exeter where Lord Carrington in charge of the Agriculture and Fisheries Board was speaking. During her seven days imprisoned she went on hunger strike and was released after four days 'in a dangerous state'. Other WSPU leaders Mary Blathwayt, Emily Blathwayt, wrote in their diaries about Phillips suffering from fainting, and Emmeline Pankhurst wrote to her "my dear girl take care of yourself and do everything in your power to recover your health and strength." Phillips also carried out what Christabel Pankhurst called a 'splendid protest' showing ' pluck and ingenuity' by hiding under the stage overnight, jumping out shouting 'Votes for Women' and objecting to Patricia Woodlock's imprisonment when two Cabinet Ministers were being awarded honorary degrees in Liverpool St George's Hall.

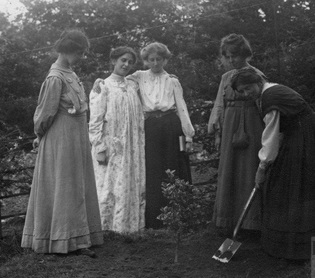
Millicent Browne planting a tree at Eagle House (suffragette's rest) with Mary Phillips, Vera Wentworth, Elsie Howey and Annie Kenney

Phillips was invited to Mary Blathwayt's home at Batheaston where the leading suffragettes met and recovered. It was known as the "Suffragette's Rest". Significant visitors were asked to plant a tree (in Phiilips case a Picea Pungens Glauca) to record their achievements on behalf of the cause e.g. a prison sentence. Phillips had been given a Hunger Strike Medal 'for Valour' by WSPU.

In November 1909, Phillips wrote to Christabel Pankhurst asking to be relieved of a militant role, which was fully supported and she had no further trouble for the next three years. Around that time she was given the job of being the WSPU organiser in Liverpool but this was short lived and Ada Flatman took over that role.

In 1910 Phillips was sent as WSPU organiser for Bradford, and when the 1911 census was enumerated she evaded the count and wrote: "NO VOTE NO CENSUS. Posterity will know how to judge the Government if it persists in bringing about the falsification of national statistics instead of acting on its own principles and making itself truly representational of the people" on the form for the WSPU’s office.

Mrs Pankhurst later wrote to her seeking her help to ensure that the women's group in Bradford did not express sympathy for the loss of Pankhurst's 20-year-old son Harry, who had died of polio, by saying "I want to get through my work, and I know you will all help me do it." Phillips work at the WSPU mostly under Christabel Pankhurst who had praised her and increased her salary. In late 1912 her own mother, also in the WSPU, had not called Mary to her deathbed in Cornwall due to her belief that the "movement needed her services."

But on 9 July 1913 she was sacked by Christabel Pankhurst who wrote saying "that you are not effective as a district organiser"; this may have been due to Phillips no longer strongly favouring militancy. Despite her long support working all over the country, four imprisonments and hunger strike, Phillips had to advertise her own services in 'situations wanted' in The Suffragette. She moved to London's East End, living in Canning Town and immediately went to work with Nora Smyth for Sylvia Pankhurst's rival East London Federation of Suffragettes, with Pankhurst, Keir Hardie, Julia Scurr, Millie Lansbury, Eveline Haverfield, Nellie Cressall and George Lansbury. Phillips continued to promote socialism and wrote for The Women's Dreadnought weekly for working women. She became the full time paid organiser for the federation working with May Billinghurst. In 1916 she was working for the New Constitutional Society for Women's Suffrage who did not support (or decry) militancy.

She now went under the name of Mary Pederson or Paterson. Mary inspired working women such as Charlotte Drake, a seamstress and barmaid, a chemical worker's wife and mother of four children under 8 years old, to also become an activist for women's suffrage. Drake was interviewed on the BBC in 1968 and explained the unusual support her husband gave when she was heckled by men about a women's place in society.

=== Later life ===
Phillips went on to work for the United Suffragists from 1915 to 1916, and the Women's International League for Peace and Freedom and Save the Children Fund. Phillips edited a brewing trade news service from 1928 to 1955, and then was an editor for the Council of Social Work. She joined the Suffragette Fellowship and Six Point Group, and in an interview in 1955 bemoaned the 'sneaky way' women got the vote as a 'sort of anti-climax really' but 'was very good to be part of it'.

== Militant Suffragettes' Reunion ==
On 18 February 1933 the Western Daily Mail reported on a reunion of suffragette "pioneers" under the auspices of the Suffragette Fellowship. Amongst those present were Mrs Graham Moffat, Edith How-Martyn, Edith New and Elsa Gye, as well as Phillips herself.

== Death ==
Mary Phillips died in a hotel in Hove in Sussex in 1969.
