= Violet Bland =

English suffragette and hotelier (1863–1940)

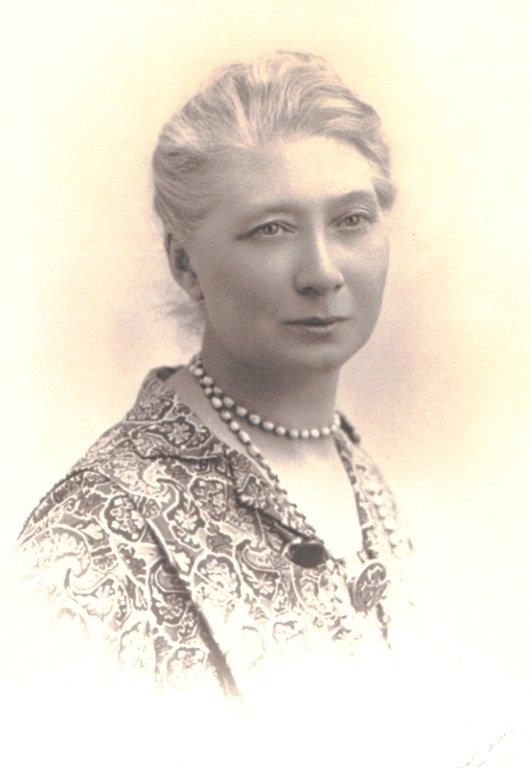
- Born: Violet Ann Bland; 17 December 1863; Bayston Hill, Shropshire, England, United Kingdom of Great Britain and Ireland
- Died: 21 March 1940 (aged 76); Tooting, London, England, United Kingdom
- Movement: Women's Social and Political Union

Violet Ann Bland (17 December 1863 – 21 March 1940) was an English suffragette and hotelier who wrote about her experiences being force fed in prison.

== Early life and career ==
Bland was born in Bayston Hill, Shropshire, the oldest of nine children of railway fitter William Henry Bland and his wife Violet. After school she became a kitchen maid at Dudmaston Hall, near Bridgnorth.

Ten years later, she was offering furnished accommodation “with good cooking” in Cirencester, first in a modest house and then in Gloucester House, a large Queen Anne mansion in Dyer Street. She acquired three new houses, renting out two of them.

By 1905 she was running a Ladies College of Domestic Science in Henley Grove, Bristol, a fifteen-bedroom parkland mansion, offering classes in hygienic cooking, food values, and gymnastics. By 1906 she had turned Henley Grove into a boutique hotel.

== Suffragette activism ==
In Bristol, Bland became active in the Women's Social and Political Union (the 'Suffragettes'). Among her guests at Henley Grove were prominent Suffragettes Annie Kenney, Lettice Floyd, Elsie Howey, Mary Phillips, Vera Wentworth, Mary Blathwayt, and Mary Sophia Allen. In August 1909, she laid on a fundraising reception to honour the Suffragette hunger strikers Lillian Dove-Wilcox and Mary Allen.

In August 1910 Bland sold-up and moved to London, where for the next 25 years she ran a guest house at 22 Old Burlington Street. She was arrested during the November 1910 Black Friday Suffragette march on Parliament. At another demonstration in 1912, she was arrested for throwing a rock through the windows of the Commercial Cable Company in Northumberland Avenue and sentenced to four months in prison.

=== Account of prison force-feeding ===
After she refused the prison food in HM Prison Aylesbury, Bland was force-fed. She wrote about this experience in Votes for Women.

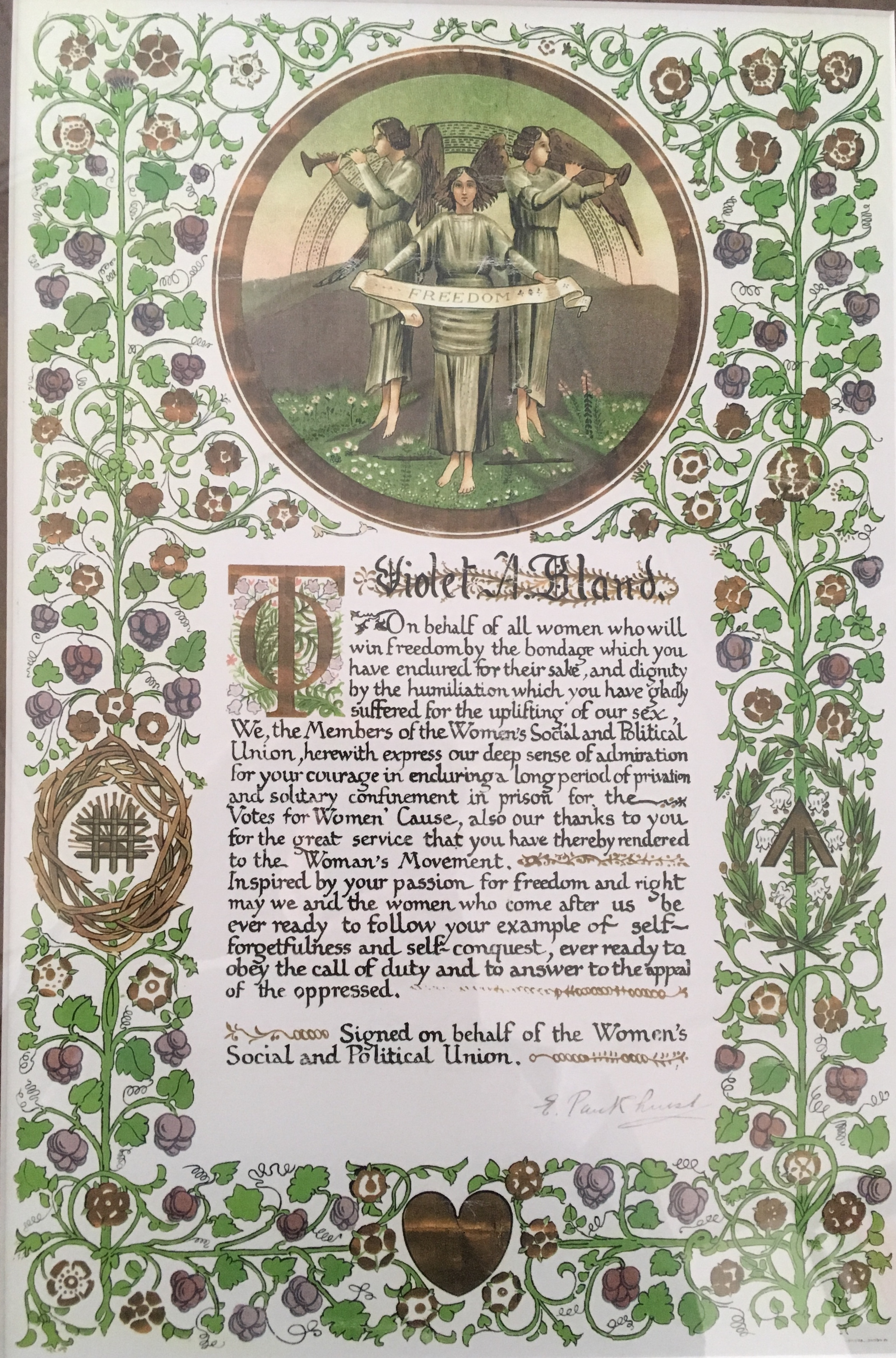
Letter of Commendation signed by suffragette leader Emmeline Pankhurst on behalf of the Women's Social and Political Union.

To honour her fortitude in prison, Bland received a Hunger Strike Medal and commendation from Emmeline Pankhurst, leader of the Suffragette movement.

The citation on the presentation case (see photo, right) reads: "Presented to Violet Ann Bland by the Women's Social and Political Union in recognition of a gallant action, whereby through endurance to the last extremity of hunger and hardship, a great principle of political justice was vindicated."

== Later life ==
In 1915, though now 52 and unmarried, Bland fostered five of her sister's orphaned children. The eldest, Richard, became the father of economists Eamonn Butler and Stuart Butler.

Violet Ann Bland died in St Benedict's Hospital, Tooting, on 21 March 1940 and was buried at City of Westminster Cemetery, Hanwell.

== See also ==
- Prisoners (Temporary Discharge for Ill Health) Act 1913
