= Millicent Browne =

British suffragist, pacifist and teacher

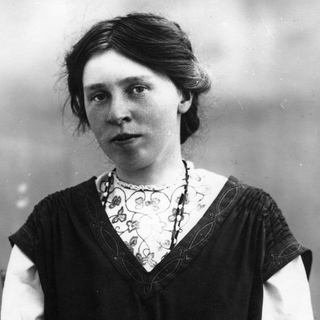
- by Linley Blathwayt in 1909
- Born: 25 December 1881; Fulham, London, England
- Died: 8 February 1975 (aged 93); Sutton Coldfield, England
- Other name: Millicent Price
- Occupations: Suffragist, teacher
- Spouse: Reginald Charles Price

Millicent Louisa Browne (25 December 1881 – 8 February 1975), later Millicent Price, was a British teacher, suffragist and pacifist. She was nicknamed "Militant Browne" by Frederick Pethwick-Lawrence.

== Early life ==
Browne was born in London, where her father Walter Browne was an actor and baritone singer. Her parents’ marriage ended around 1884 and her mother Ellen Phyllis Browne took her and her two sisters to live in York. Her mother was a descendant of William Wilberforce.

Browne was educated at Castlegate College, York, then was a pupil-teacher at the Priory Street School. She trained as a teacher at Swansea Training College until 1902, before teaching at Beeston School in Leeds and Scarcroft School in York.

== Suffragist activism ==
Browne was a campaigner for the Women's Social and Political Union (WSPU) and in 1907 was posted to the branch in Bristol, where she became a close friend of Annie Kenney. She travelled around Britain giving talks in support of Women's suffrage, including in Derbyshire, Wiltshire, and Rhyl and Llandudno in Wales.

Whilst campaigning in Bristol, Browne met her future husband Reginald Charles Price. Price was a Bristol Universitystudent who helped to defend a group of suffragettes when they were protesting. His father was a well known Birmingham jeweller.

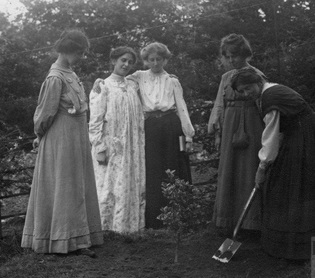
Browne planting a tree at Eagle House (suffragette's rest) with Mary Phillips, Vera Wentworth, Elsie Howey and Annie Kenney

Browne was invited to Emily Blathwayt's home at Eagle House, Batheaston where the leading suffragettes recouped. Significant visitors were asked to plant a tree to record their achievements on behalf of the cause e.g. a prison sentence. On 4 July 1909 Browne planted not a tree but a holly bush. Linley Blathwayt took her picture and recorded the planting. Most of the trees were destroyed in the 1960s, but Browne's plaque is one of the few to have survived.

Browne was a pacifist and Quaker, as well as a supporter of the campaign for women's enfranchisement, and left the WSPU in 1911 when their tactics became more militant and violent.

== Later life ==
During World War I, Browne worked for the Friends War Victims Relief Committee to support Belgian war refugees. As her husband was a pacifist and Quaker like his wife, he was a conscientious objector. The couple later supported peace organisations.

Browne wrote her autobiography in 1935 and copies are held in the archives in York and at the Women's Library in London.

She died in 1975.
