= Blathwayt =

Blathwayt is a surname. Notable people with the surname include:

- Emily Blathwayt (1852–1940), British suffragette
- Mary Blathwayt (1879–1961), British feminist, suffragette and social reformer, daughter of Emily
- William Blathwayt (1649–1717), English diplomat, public official and politician
