= Helen Kirkpatrick Watts =

British suffragette

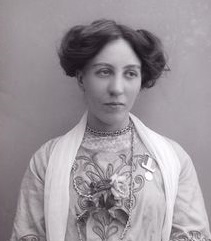
- Born: 1881; Bishopwearmouth, County Durham, England
- Died: 18 August 1972 (aged 90–91); Chilcompton, Somerset, England
- Occupation: nurse
- Known for: militant suffragette

Helen Kirkpatrick Watts (1881 – 18 August 1972) was a militant British suffragette from Nottingham.

== Life ==
Watts was born in Bishopwearmouth, County Durham in 1881. Her father, Alan Hunter Watts, was the vicar at Holy Trinity Church in Lenton near Nottingham; her mother was Ethelinda Woodrow Cassels. She came to notice after she joined the Women's Social and Political Union in 1907 after being inspired by a local speech by Christabel Pankhurst.

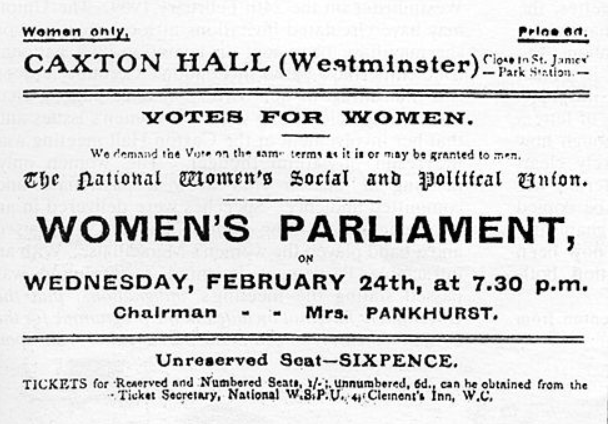
Women's Parliament 24 Feb 1909 - the invitation for Helen

Watts was deaf and as a consequence she spoke with a strong accent. Her year of action was 1909. On 24 February she attended the "Women's Parliament" at Caxton Hall and after that a small number decided to form a deputation to parliament. She was the second to be arrested outside the House of Commons after being involved in a WSPU demonstration. She was charged with obstruction and after refusing to improve her behaviour she was sentenced to one month's imprisonment. Her release was celebrated by the suffragettes and her achievement was recognised with flowers. Watts believed that actions and not words were required and in September she was again making trouble in Leicester where Winston Churchill was making a speech. She was released from Leicester Prison after a 90-hour hunger strike. Watts was given a Hunger Strike Medal 'for Valour' by WSPU.

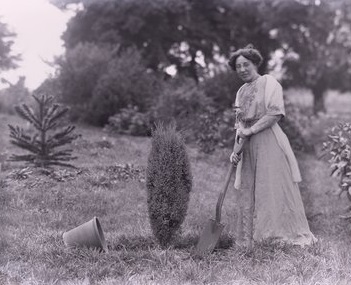
Helen Watts at Eagle House in 1911 planting a commemorative tree

Watts was living with her brother Neville in 1911 in Chilcompton in Somerset.

Watts achievements for the cause were recognised by Mary Blathwayt and her parents Linley and Emily Blathwayt. She was invited to their house Eagle House which was also in Somerset. Emily Blathwayt had chosen a field in the grounds of their house where suffragettes who had been imprisoned were celebrated with a particular conifer. Like other famous suffragette's Watts' visit was recorded with a purpose-made lead plaque. She was photographed by Colonel Lindley Blathwayt planting a Juniper plant on 17 March 1911. His portraits were signed and sold at the WSPU shop in Bath.

Like the Blathwayts, Watts did not agree when the WSPU hardened its militancy to include acts of arson. Like many suffragettes Watts left the WSPU and joined the Women's Freedom League. During the war she was a nurse at the Mineral Water Hospital in Bath, Somerset.

Watts wrote one of the last known accounts of "Annie's Arboretum" at Eagle House. She visited in 1962 and took a sprig of juniper as a souvenir. The local newspaper reported that she could not find the plaque but she did find stout trees and with the aid of Colonel Blathwayt's photo she identified "her" juniper.

In 1965 she left for Canada presumably to live with her sister Ethelinda but she later returned to the UK.

== Death and legacy ==
Watts was living in Hove but died in Chilcompton on 18 August 1972. Her papers turned up later in Avonmouth and were donated to the archives in Nottingham. Her suffragette medal was auctioned in 1999.

In March 2016, Nottingham Women’s History Group planted a juniper tree in Helen’s honour in Nottingham Arboretum. Two years later, on 14 December 2018, and 100 days years to the day when the first women in the UK were able to vote in a general election, a commemorative plaque was placed next to the tree.
