= Florence Haig =

Scottish artist and suffragette (1856–1952)

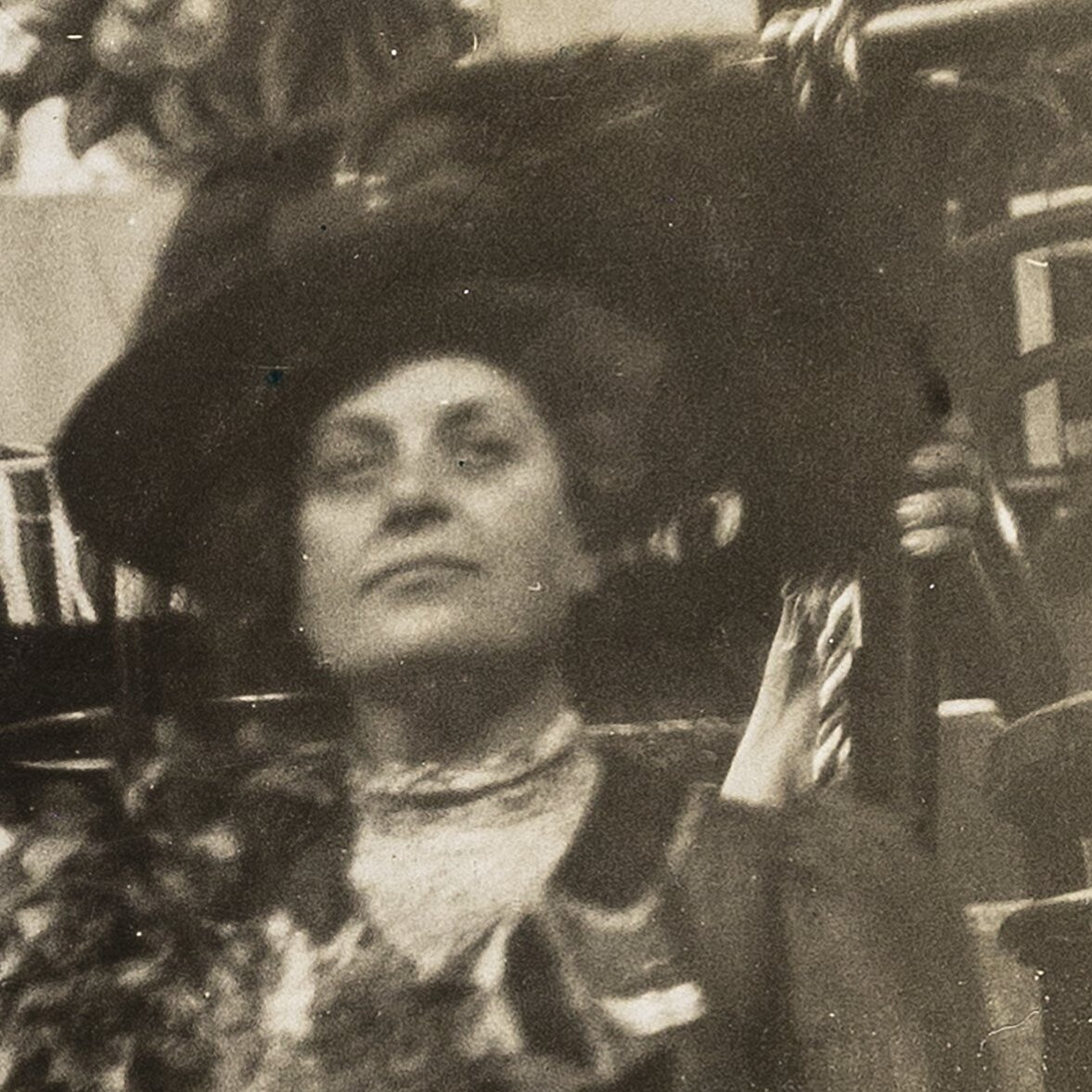
- Portrait of Haig, cropped from a group photograph
- Born: Florence Eliza Haig; 1856; Berwickshire, Scotland
- Died: 1952 (aged 95–96); Wandsworth, England
- Known for: Suffragette, artist
- Relatives: Field Marshal Douglas Haig (cousin) Janet Boyd, suffragette (cousin) Matt Haig, Author (Great-great-great Nephew)
- Awards: Hunger Strike Medal 'for Valour'

Florence Eliza Haig (1856–1952) was a Scottish artist and suffragette who was decorated for imprisonments and hunger strikes.

== Biography ==
Haig was born in 1856. Her father was a Berwickshire barrister and she had two sisters, Cecilia and Evelyn. Her cousin Douglas Haig went on to be Field Marshal Haig in 1915.

She was an artist and her pastel of the physicist John Tyndall was photographed and a copy is in the National Portrait gallery.

Her involvement with the women's suffrage movement started with a £1 donation in 1901 to the National Union of Women's Suffrage Societies. She made another in 1907 but in February she was attracted to the rival Women's Social and Political Union. This was a more militant organisation led by the Emmeline Pankhurst. Haig she saw them in action at the "Women's Parliament" which was held on 24 February 1907 at Caxton Hall.

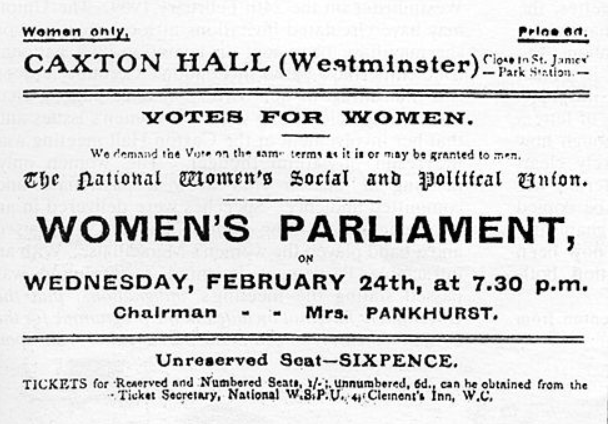
The "Women's Parliament" 24 February 1909

Haig and her sister, Evelyn, started a local branch of the WSPU in Edinburgh, but she then left for London. Haig was met by a young Grace Roe when suffragettes were chalking the pavement in Kensington High Street. Haig invited Roe to the demonstration at Hyde Park and she went and was inspired by Christabel Pankhurst. Haig became a founder member of East London Federation of Suffragettes and had her artist studio in Limehouse, and co-ordinated all classes of women to campaign together.

Haig was in the 1908 delegation with Emmeline Pankhurst, including Jessie Stephenson, Maud Joachim and Mary Philips, when Mrs Pankhurst was attempting unsuccessfully to see the Prime Minister. A year after the Women's Parliament she was involved with the audacious "pantechnicon raid". This was where a furniture van (pantechnicon) was used as a "Trojan Horse" to get twenty suffragettes to the House of Commons. When they were close, Haig, Maria Brackenbury, Georgina Brackenbury joined the rest who tried to rush their way into the lobby. Haig was arrested together with the Brackenburys. They received six-week sentences. Haig said on her release that it was'wonderful how each woman who acts influences their own circle. Friends who before may have been but mildly in favour, are converted into active and eager workers for the cause. Coming out is so delightful that the stupidity of the time in Holloway is forgotten'.

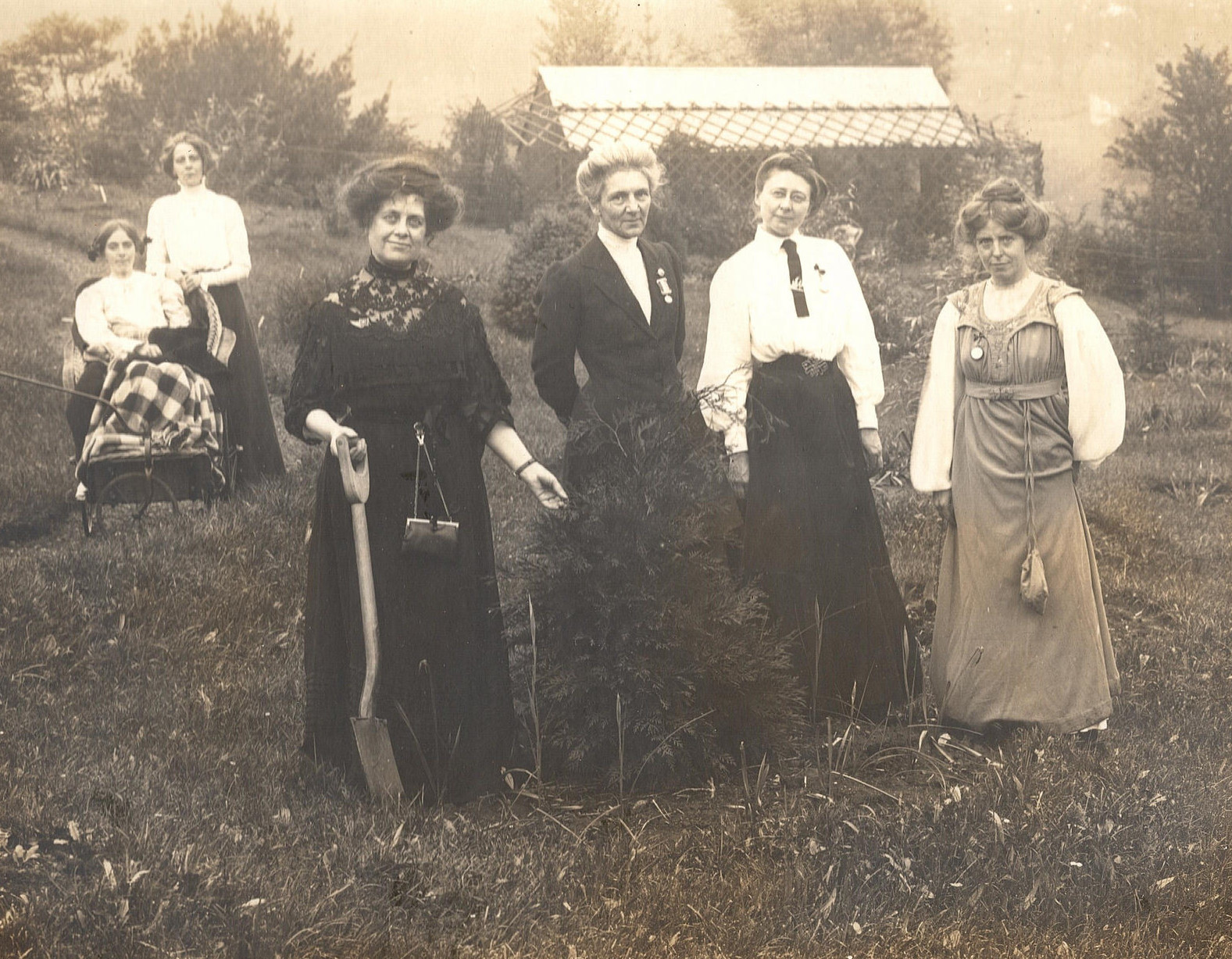
Jessie and Kitty Kenney, Florence Haig, Marion Wallace-Dunlop, Mary Blathwayt and Annie Kenney at Eagle House

Haig's imprisonment was celebrated and later hunger strike recognised by the leaders of the movement.

She was entitled to the tradition of planting a commemorative tree at the "Suffragette's Rest". The "Suffragette's Rest" was the nickname for Mary Blathwayt's home of Eagle House in Somerset. This was where Blathwayt's parents indulged their WSPU enthusiasm and welcomed women to recuperate from imprisonment. Her parents had set land aside to plant an individual tree for each WSPU member sentenced to prison for the cause. The planting was then photographed by Blathwayt's father. The trees and the photographs recorded their achievements, known as 'Annie's Arboretum' after suffragette Annie Kenney, one of the first to recuperate at the Blathwayts.

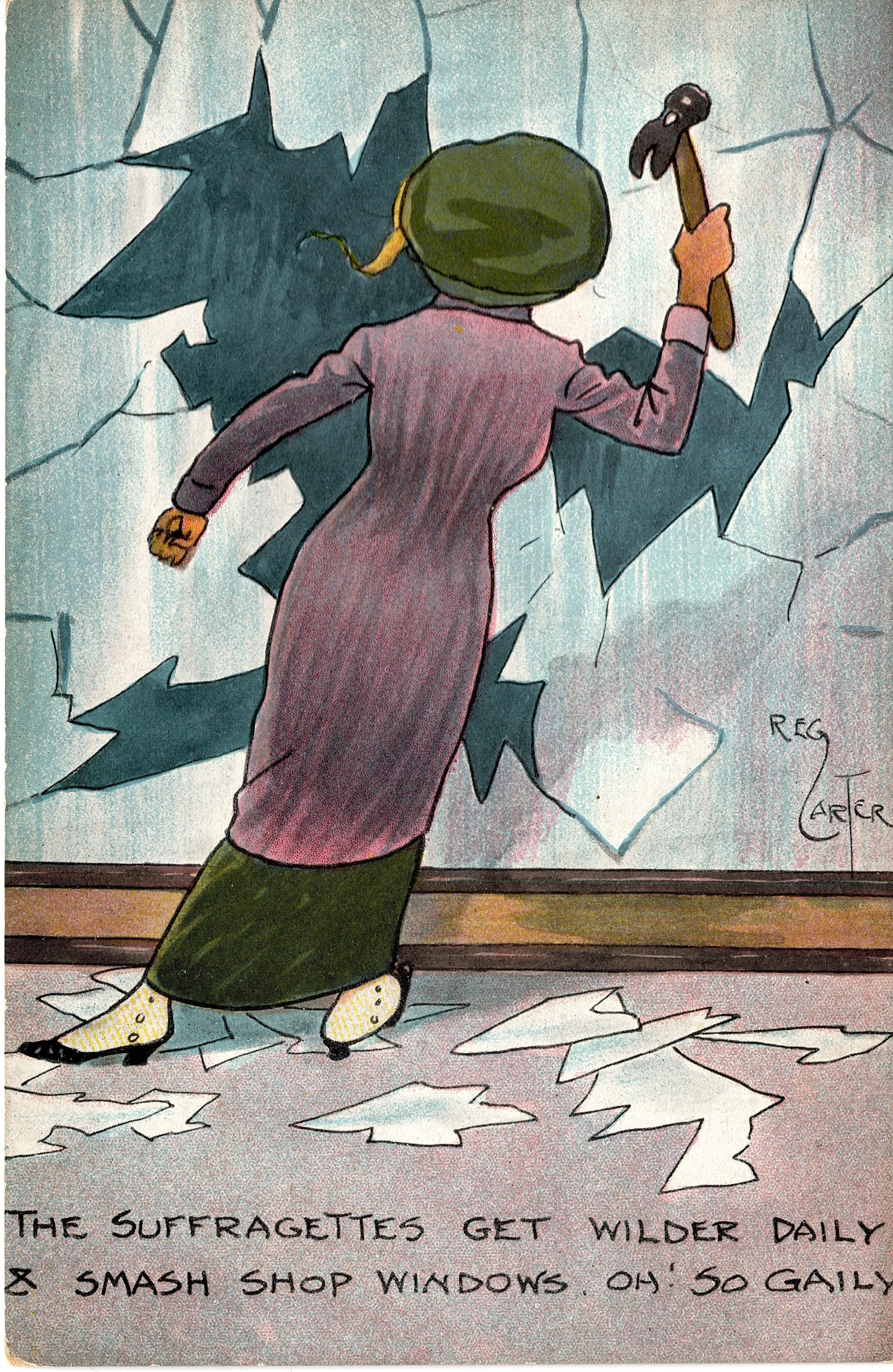
cartoon of woman in suffragette colours smashing windows

In 1912 the WSPU organised a mass window breaking campaign in London's Oxford Street. Many were arrested and Haig, taking part despite her sister Cecilia having recently died, broke the windows of D.H.Evans in Oxford Street and was arrested with her cousin Janet Boyd and received a four-month sentence for her involvement. Haig immediately went on hunger strike and was subsequently released after four days.

Haig was given a Hunger Strike Medal 'for Valour' by WSPU.The citation engraved on the bar is 'For Valour' and the inscription says

"PRESENTED BY THE WOMEN'S SOCIAL AND POLITICAL UNION IN RECOGNITION OF A GALLANT ACTION, WHEREBY THROUGH ENDURANCE TO THE LAST EXTREMITY OF HUNGER AND HARDSHIP A GREAT PRINCIPLE OF POLITICAL JUSTICE WAS VINDICATED."

The medal ribbons were in the WSPU colours of green white and purple. Haig's medal (box is missing) is in the Museum of London.

Haig left the East London Federation at the start of World War I and joined Emmeline Pankhurst, Annie Kenney and Mabel Tuke in their halt of militancy and turning to support the war effort. Haig was one of the movement chosen as coffin carriers at Emmeline Pankhurst's funeral in June 1928. Haig died in Wandsworth, London in 1952.

== Personal life ==
Haig was a vegetarian. She exhibited regularly and was a member of the New Society of Artists. She also joined the Society of Women Artists in 1934.
