= Clara Mordan =

British suffragist and benefactor

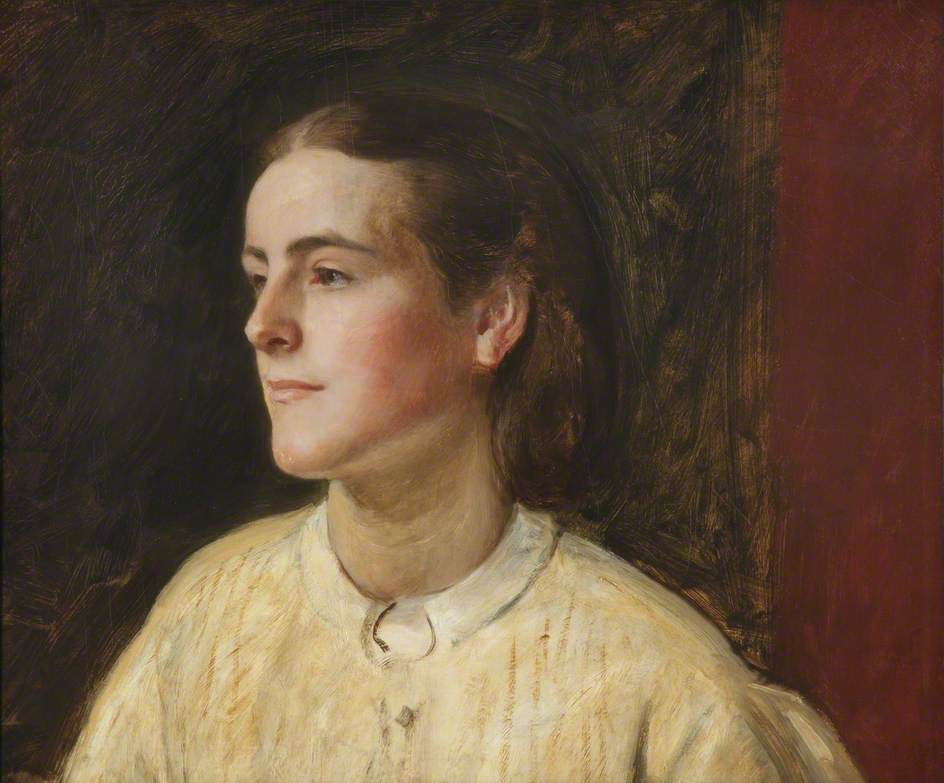
- Portrait of Clara Mordan by Henry Tanworth Wells
- Born: 28 September 1844; Southwark, London, England
- Died: 22 January 1915 (aged 70); Bexhill-on-Sea, East Sussex, England
- Known for: benefactor to the Women's Social and Political Union and St Hugh's College, Oxford
- Partner: Mary Gray Allen

Clara Evelyn Mordan (28 September 1844 – 22 January 1915) was a British suffragist and benefactor to the Women's Social and Political Union and St Hugh's College, Oxford. Tuberculosis obliged her to fight for women's rights by supporting militant protests by proxy. She hoped that her "last bed will be a coffin some woman has earned her living by making".

== Early life ==
Mordan was born in Southwark to a family who owned a company who made propelling pencils. She was the eldest of the two daughters of Augustus and Elizabeth Jane Mordan. Her sister Ada married and had children but Clara was a lesbian who avoided marriage by expressing concern that marriage would mean surrendering the control of her money to her husband. Her attentions turned to the cause of women's rights. She was inspired by a lecture by John Stuart Mill in 1866, which she attended with her father. Mordan was given a lot of financial freedom by her father and she established her own home and household.

== Suffrage activism ==
After 1880 she joined the London Women's Suffrage Society and the Central Society for Women's Suffrage. Despite suffering from tuberculosis she served on their executive committees, had letterheads made with "Votes for Women" on them, and she was generous with her funding to these causes.

1897 saw her second interest develop. She heard a paper read by Annie Rogers in London about the need for better women's education. This was just after a proposal to allow women to be awarded degrees was defeated. Mordan had no formal education; she is thought to have been educated at home by governesses, but she wanted to support the idea. She set out with her partner Mary Gray Allen to decide the best deserving college and St Hugh's College, Oxford was identified. She contracted to supply an annuity of £40 per annum to fund a scholarship on the condition that there was no vivisection involved in the recipients research.

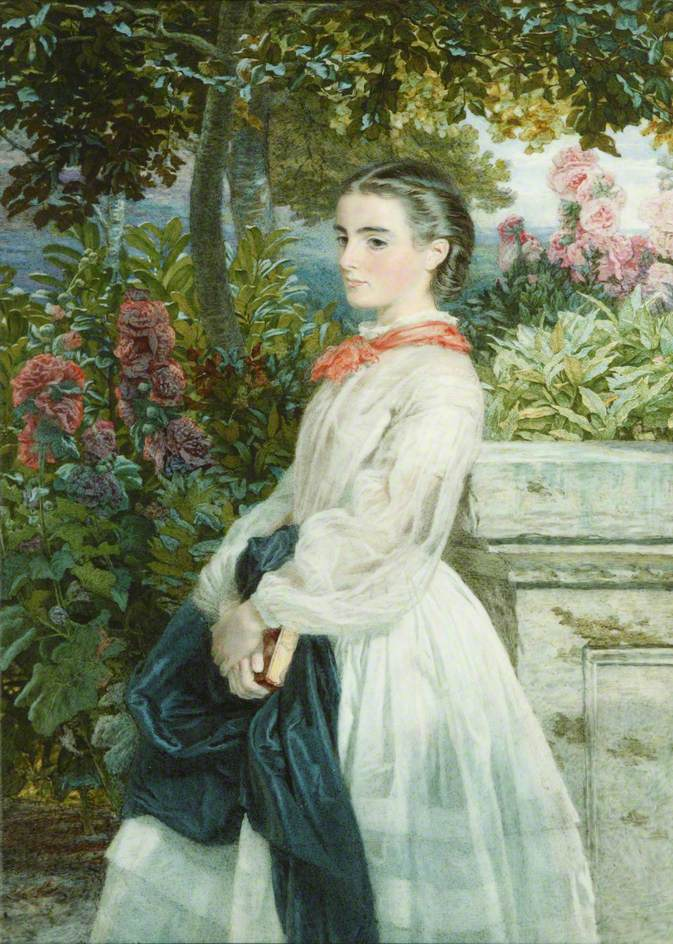
Clara Evelyn Mordan by unknown artist

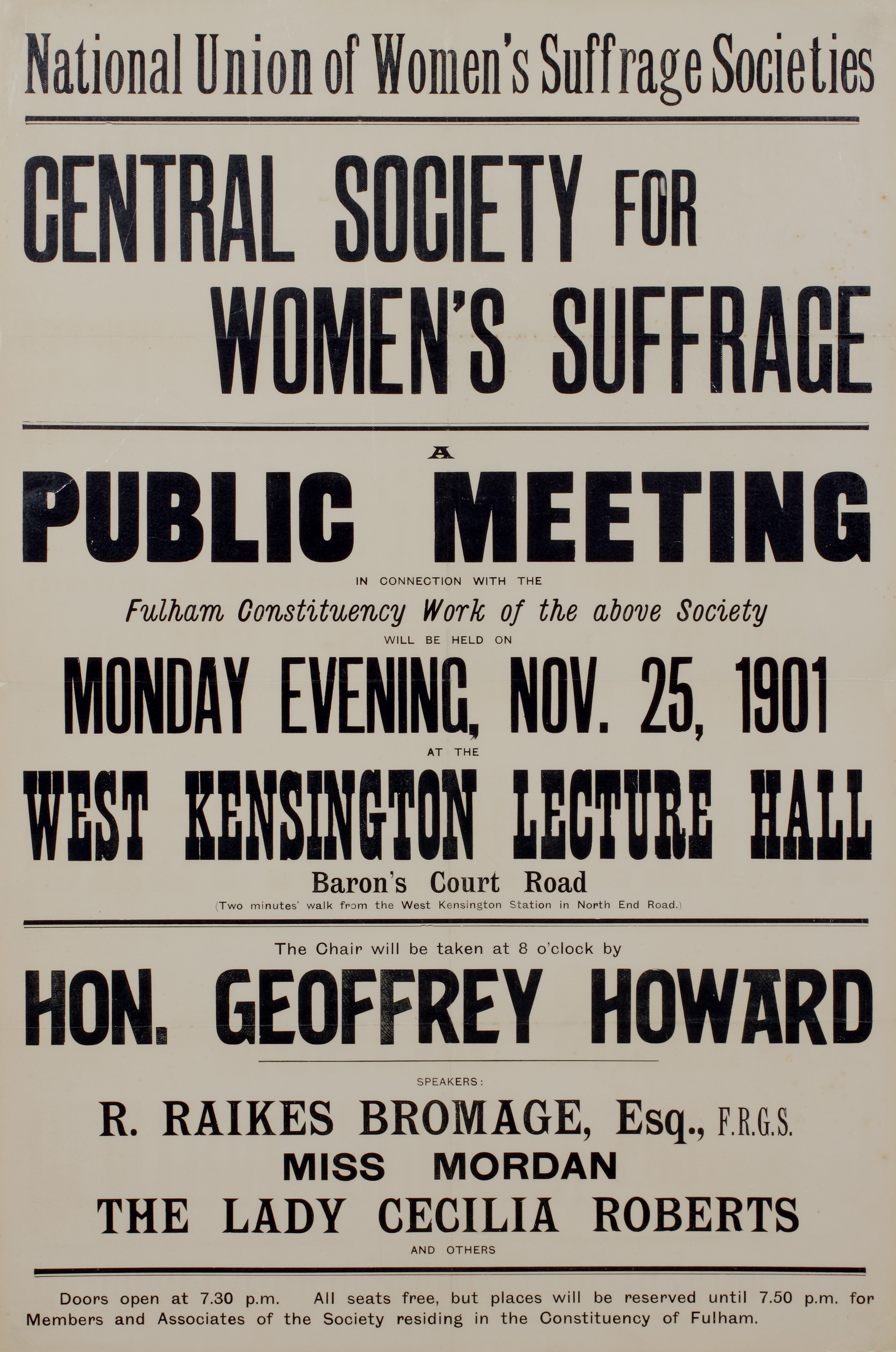
Miss Mordan to speak in 1901

In 1901 her father died. She was now the only child and he left £117,000. In 1906 after many years of interest she joined the militant Women's Social and Political Union which was led by Emmeline Pankhurst, but it was a speech by Annie Kenney that inspired her. Moreover, she has the distinction of being their first benefactor of their newly founded WSPU campaign fund. Annie Kenney went round to see her after the event to thank her for the twenty pounds she had sent them towards their expenses.

She spoke on their behalf and attended protest meetings. The 1908 WSPU procession was said to be mainly funded by Mordan and when the protesters reached Hyde Park they listened to speeches including one by Mordan. She also had the honour of unveiling a banner designed by Sylvia Pankhurst at the event, given by Emmeline Pethick-Lawrence, which featured two eagles holding a shield bearing the motto "Hope is strong! Awake! Arise!" Mordon funded a variety of other projects from a WSPU Art exhibition at the Prince's Skating Club in 1909 to $200 set aside for a "return to militancy" in 1912.

Mordan was invited to Eagle House in Batheaston on 27 April 1910 to plant a holly tree. Eagle House was where Mary Blathwayt's family entertained visitors at their "Suffragette's Rest". Many notable supporters were invited to the house. Emily Blathwayt and her family invited leading suffragettes and their supporters to plant trees and shrubs in "Annie's Arboretum" to commemorate their achievements and her husband recorded these in photographs. The arboretum was named after Annie Kenney and she had a room at Eagle House.

Morden knew that she would die of tuberculosis and this meant that her militant acts were performed by proxy. She commented in a letter published by the newspaper Votes for Women that "I have impressed upon my doctor that she really must keep me alive till I can have a reasonable prospect of feeling that my last bed will be a coffin some woman has earned her living by making."

== St Hugh's College ==
Morden first visited St Hugh's College in 1897. With Mordan's backing, St Hugh's bought a house called "The Mount" from University College and began to move to their new permanent site in 1913. The house was demolished to make way for the Main Building of the college which was funded by Mordan. She also gave £1000 to endow a scholarship.

She was given regular updates by St Hughs staff after she became ill, and in reply she had said that the college was one of her proudest achievements. St Hugh's College named their new library Mordan Hall in recognition of her contributions to the college.

== Death ==
Mordan left most of her wealth to her partner Mary Gray Allen who had shared her life. When Allen died in Bexhill-on-Sea in 1915, she left a large bequest to St Hugh's college.
