= Gladice Keevil =

British suffragette

Gladice Keevil Rickford
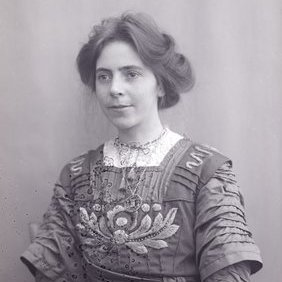
- Gladice Keevil, 1910
- Born: Gladice Georgina Keevil; 1884; Cricklewood, London, England
- Died: 1959 (aged 74–75)
- Education: Frances Buss School in Camden
- Alma mater: Lambeth School of Art
- Occupation: Suffragette

Gladice Georgina Keevil (later Mrs Rickford; 1884 – 1959) was a British suffragette who served as head of the Midlands office of the Women's Social and Political Union between 1908 and 1910.

== Early life ==
Gladice was born and had her childhood at Clitterhouse Farm in Cricklewood in North West London. She was educated at the Cricklewood Kindergarten (where she won a prize for clay modelling in 1891) and Cricklewood High School, the Frances Buss School in Camden, and the Lambeth School of Art. She worked as a governess in France and the USA before returning to Britain in 1907. She married in 1913, becoming Mrs. Rickford.

== Involvement in the Women's Suffrage Movement ==
After joining the WSPU in September 1907, Gladice was employed as the head of the Midlands as a National Organiser in 1908. She opened a WSPU Midlands headquarters in Birmingham where she worked with Bertha Ryland and Laura Ainsworth. She was campaigning at the Bury St Edmunds by-election (1907) with Rachel Barrett, Nellie Martel, Emmeline Pankhurst, Aeta Lamb and Elsa Gye, organised the campaign during the Wolverhampton by-election in 1908. She was a key speaker at demonstrations in support of women's suffrage in Heaton Park (July 1908) Hyde Park (1908) and Belfast (1910).

== Arrest in 1908 ==
Gladice was one of twelve women who was arrested after walking single file through the streets towards the houses of commons with Mrs. Pankhurst in February 1908 "to present a petition from the Conference at Caxton Hall, and to the refusal of the authorities to treat suffragist offenders as first-class misdemeanants." Gladice was arrested along with Mrs Pankhurst and others and was charged with resisting and obstructing the police.

"Mrs. Pankhurst, Miss Annie Kenney, and the eight other women suffragists who were arrested on Thursday in attempting to make their way to the Houses of Parliament were yesterday brought before Mr. Horace Smith at the Westminster Police Court. They were charged with resisting and obstructing the police.

...

Miss Kenney and Mrs. Baldock, against whom there were previous convictions, were each fined £5, with the alternative of one month's imprisonment in the second division. Mrs. Pankhurst and the other defendants were each ordered to find sureties of £20 to be of good behaviour for twelve months, or to go to prison for six weeks in the second division. All the ten women chose to go to prison."

== Recognition ==
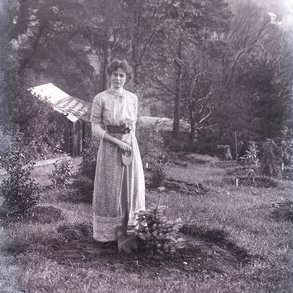
Keevil being honoured in 1910 at Eagle House

In 1910 Keevil was invited to stay at Eagle House in Bathampton, Somerset where a tree was planted in her honour. Many significant women from the suffragette movement were invited to stay at Mary Blathwayt's parents' home and to plant a tree to recover from and celebrate a prison sentence. The trees were known as "Annie's Arboretum" after Annie Kenney. Gladice was invited to Eagle House several times. Mary's mother thought her one of the nicer suffragettes. The Blathwayts fell out with the movement when politician's were assaulted. The WSPU movement split over the authority demanded by Emmeline and Christabel Pankhurst and their increasing demands for extremism. Keevil is thought to have left in about 1911.

== Later life ==
Keevil married in 1913 and went to live in Burpham, West Sussex, in the 1940s where she brought up three sons. She died in 1959.
