= Maud Joachim =

English suffragette (1869–1947)

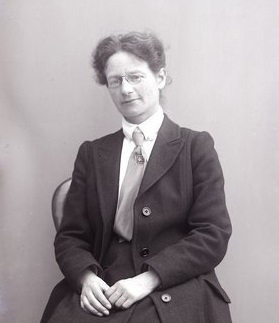
- Born: Maud Amelia Fanny Joachim; 16 February 1869; Paddington, London, England
- Died: 16 February 1947 (aged 77); Steyning, West Sussex, England
- Education: Girton College, Cambridge
- Organisation(s): Women's Social and Political Union; East London Federation of Suffragettes
- Known for: Suffragette
- Relatives: Joseph Joachim (uncle); Etheldred Browning (cousin); Francis Browning (cousin)
- Awards: Hunger Strike Medal

Maud Amalia Fanny Joachim (1 August 1869 – 16 February 1947) was an English suffragette and member of the Women's Social and Political Union (WSPU). She was jailed several times for her protests. Joachim was one of the first suffragettes to go on hunger strike when imprisoned, a protest at not being recognised as political prisoners. She was later a member of the socialist East London Federation of Suffragettes (ELFS) and campaigned against fascism.

== Early life and education ==
Maud Amelia Fanny Joachim was born to Ellen Margaret (née Smart) and Henry Joachim in Paddington, London, on 1 August 1869. She had three sisters, Gertrude was older than her and Dorothy and Nina were younger. Her father, a wool merchant had been born in Hungary and became a naturalized British subject in 1856, and received a certificate of naturalization in February 1874 following the Naturalization Act 1870 (33 & 34 Vict. c. 14). Her paternal uncle was the violinist and composer Joseph Joachim. Etheldred Browning and Frank Henry Browning were her maternal cousins

Joachim was educated at Girton College, Cambridge between 1890 and 1893, studying moral science.

== Suffragette activism ==
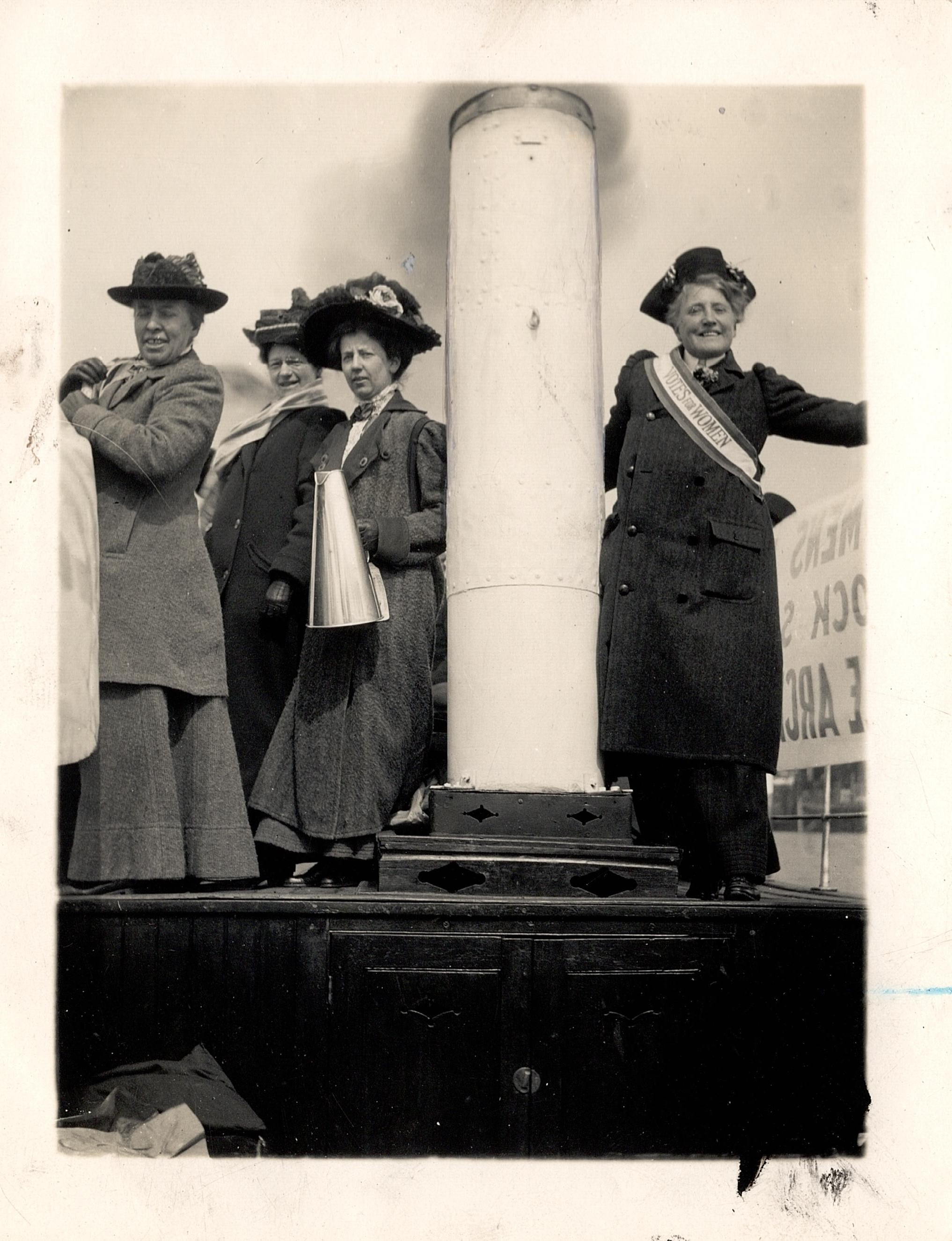
WSPU suffragettes Joachim, Hilda Dallas, Harriett Kerr and one other at the Oxford and Cambridge Boat Race

Joachim was militant and a member of the hard line Women's Social and Political Union (WSPU) which was led by Emmeline Pankhurst, becoming involved in 1907. She enjoyed the camaraderie and reflected that she was now with people with the same purpose, writing in Votes For Women that: "What one finds on joining the WSPU is, that one is brought into contact with a great number of people whose ideals are the same as one’s own, and that the isolation and the reproach are things of the past."

=== Imprisonments ===
- In February 1908 Joachim and groups of suffragettes were delivered to the front door of the House of Commons, transported in pantechnicon vans. This event was called the "Pantechnicon Raid", the group was arrested, and she was sentenced to six weeks imprisonment.
- In June 1908 Joachim was arrested again after an attempt to visit the Prime Minister, along with Mrs Pankhurst, Emmeline Pethick- Lawrence, Jessie Stephenson and Florence Haig. Joachim was thwarted and a crowd rushed the police. Joachim was sentenced to three months in Holloway Prison.
- In 1909 Joachim was in Scotland working in Aberdeen. That November she joined a protest that disturbed a talk by Winston Churchill at Kinnaird Hall in his constituency of Dundee. She was arrested along with Helen Archdale, Catherine Corbett and Adela Pankhurst, refused to pay a fine, and was sentenced to ten days in Dundee Prison. During their sentence the five women went on hunger strike.
- Joachim was arrested again on 18 November 1910 at the Black Friday event, but was not charged.

In an imaginative protest organised with Katherine Douglas Smith, Joachim held up traffic in the West End by the two riding black bay horses up the Strand, at the same time advertising a suffragette meeting at the Royal Albert Hall.

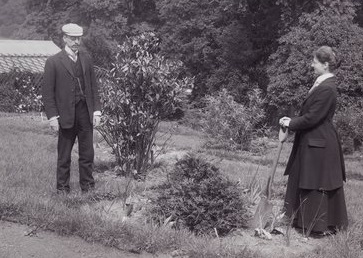
Mary's brother William Blathwayt and Joachim at Eagle House in 1910

=== Residency at Eagle House ===
Joachim was invited to Eagle House in 1910. A plaque was made and her photograph was recorded by Colonel Linley Blathwayt.

Eagle House near Bath in Somerset had become an important refuge for suffragettes who had been released from prison after hunger strikes. Mary Blathwayt's parents planted trees there between April 1909 and July 1911 to commemorate the achievements of suffragettes including Emmeline Pankhurst, Christabel Pankhurst, Annie Kenney, Charlotte Despard, Millicent Fawcett and Lady Lytton. Joachim planted a Thujopsis Dolabrata conifer on 17 June 1910. The trees were known as "Annie's Arboreatum" after Annie Kenney. There was also a "Pankhurst Pond" within the grounds. Joachim was back in London when the 1911 census was enumerated and refused to provide any information to the census enumerator as part of the suffragette boycott.

Alongside a number of other WSPU members, in 1913 Joachim moved away from the organisation and radical action as violent protest escalated to arson. She moved her energies towards the socialist East London Federation of Suffragettes (ELFS), joining in 1914. The ELFS offered practical support to working-class women alongside campaigning for the vote.

== Later life ==
Joachim ran an unemployment bureau and managed a toy factory for the ELFS during World War I. She later worked with Sylvia Pankhurst on her anti-fascist Ethiopian campaign.

In the 1939 Register of England and Wales, Joachim was listed as living on private means in Somerset Terrace in St Pancras, London, and later moved to Mouse Cottage, Steyning, West Sussex, where she lived until her death on 16 February 1947, aged 77.

== Personal life ==
Joachim was a vegetarian. She was given a Hunger Strike Medal 'for Valour' by WSPU, the box engraved with "Presented to Maud Joachim by the Women's Social and Political Union in recognition of a gallant action, whereby through endurance to the last extremity of hunger and hardship a great principle of political justice was vindicated". An inscription on the back of one of the medal's bars commemorates her being FED BY FORCE 1/3/12 (1st March 1912).

== Death ==
Maud Joachim died in Steyning, West Sussex, in 1947. On her death Joachim left legacies to fellow suffragettes Sylvia Pankhurst and Katherine Douglas-Smith as well as Girton College. Dorothy Bagnold Sowter of the Women's Pioneer Housing was executor of her will.

== Commemoration ==
Joachim's WSPU medal was offered for auction at Bonhams on 3 October 2023 and sold for £41,600 inc. premium. Glasgow Women's Library set up a fundraising campaign to buy it, raising £28,000 from c.500 individual donations with the rest of the purchase price supported by the Scottish Government's National Fund for Acquisitions. The medal featured as the star object in the exhibition We Deserve A Medal: Militant Suffrage Activism at the library (1 February-31 May 2024).

== See also ==
- Eagle House (suffragette's rest)
- Hunger Strike Medal
