= Gertrude Stewart =

British suffragette

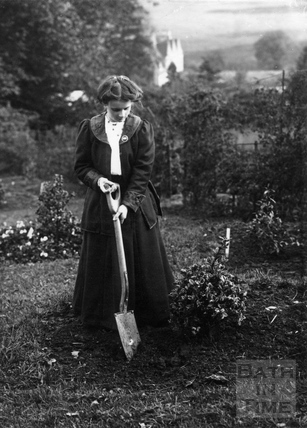
- Suffragette Gertrude Stewart planting a tree at Eagle House. There is ambiguity about her identity.

Gertrude Stewart was a suffragette during the 19th century who campaigned in the United Kingdom. There is a photograph labelled as Gertrude Stewart as part of the Eagle House Suffragettes, however, there is uncertainty about her identify in records of known suffragettes.

== Activism ==
There is little known about Stewart’s background. She is listed as holding the role of Secretary in the Central and Western National Society for Women’s Suffrage in 1893 and as Secretary of the Manchester National Society for Women's Suffrage in 1895. She is also recorded as attending the AGM of the National Society for Women’s Suffrage on 2 July 1896 at Westminster Town Hall. Their aim was to lobby Members of Parliament with the goal of having a bill introduced in Parliament that ensured women’s right to vote.

== Eagle House Suffragettes ==
There is ambiguity about whether the Gertrude Stewart outlined above stayed at Eagle House. Eagle House was part of an estate where Suffragettes came to rest and recover following time in prison. Often the suffragettes who stayed there planted a tree.

There is a photo from 1909 showing a woman planting a tree who is labelled as Gertrude Stewart. However, it is thought that the woman in the photo may be too young to be the same Gertrude Stewart who is recorded as Secretary in the records outlined above.

There is a Gertrude Stewart listed on the Roll of Honour of Suffragette Prisoners between 1905 and 1914 but her surname is spelt Stuart, rather than Stewart. This imprisonment mean it could be this Gertrude that is photographed planting the tree at Eagle House. However, little else is known about her.

There is another suffragette who could be the Gertrude Stewart pictured in the photograph. Nora Helen Gertrude Stewart was the daughter of a Field-Marshal and had previously divorced her first husband in 1894, an uncommon occurrence at that time. In 1899, she married Leopold Jenner. However, she was known by the name of Nora Jenner making it unlikely that she would have been recorded as Gertrude Stewart while at Eagle’s House.

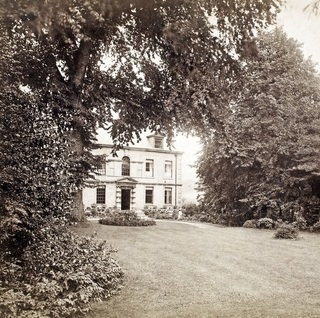
Eagle House, Batheaston c.1890
