= Clara Codd =

British writer, suffragette, socialist feminist and theosophist

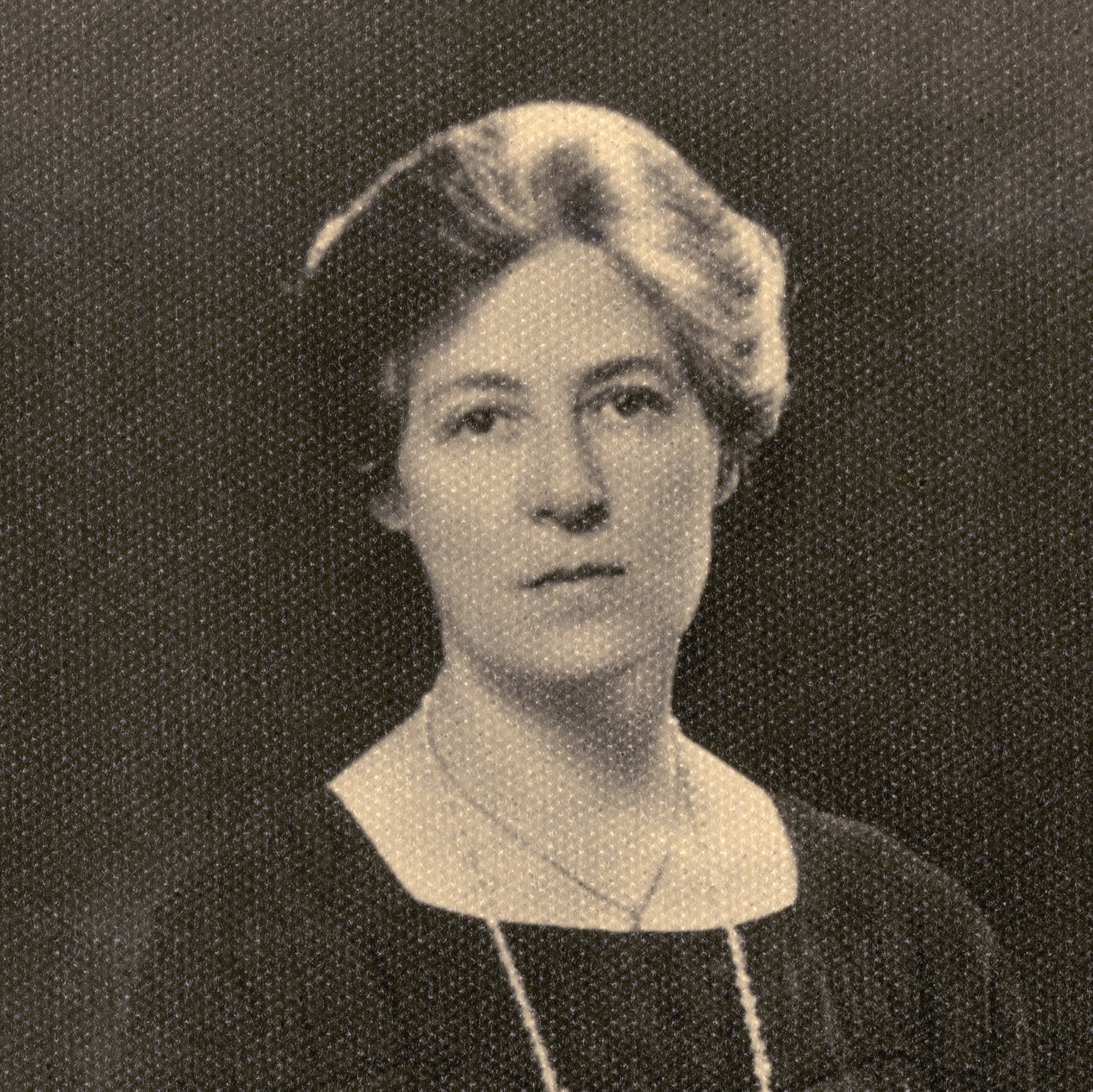
- Codd in 1910
- Born: 10 October 1876; Bishops Tawton, Devon, England
- Died: 3 April 1971 (aged 94); Heatherwood Hospital, Berkshire, England
- Writing career
- Literary movement: Theosophist

Clara Margaret Codd (10 October 1876 – 3 April 1971) was a British writer, suffragette, socialist feminist, and theosophist. She went to jail for the suffragettes and then devoted her life to the Theosophical Society.

== Early life ==
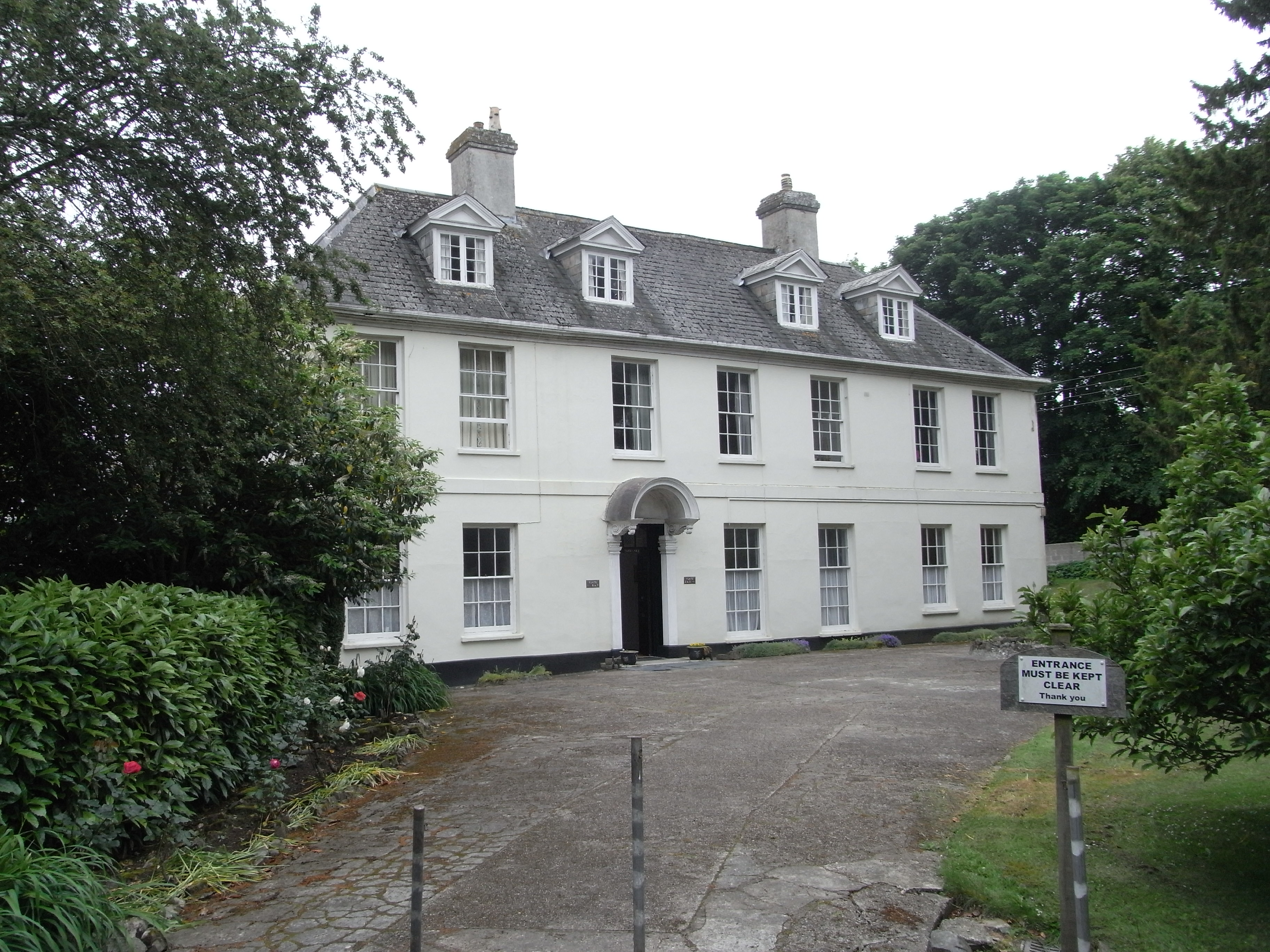
Pill, Bishop's Tawton, Codd's birthplace

Codd was born at Pill House in Bishops Tawton, Devon, in 1876. She was the first child of Henry Frederick Codd and Clara Virginia (née Botto) Codd. Her father was a Liberal and worked as a school inspector. She had nine younger siblings and she was taught at home by a number of governesses.

== Career and activism ==
At the age of fifteen she became an atheist. After her father's death the family moved to Geneva where Codd herself worked to support the family. She was employed as a governess, a costume model and she travelled to play the violin and piano. She was converted to Theosophy after hearing the first President of the Theosophical Society, Henry Steel Olcott, give a talk in Geneva. By 1903 she had returned to the UK where she joined the Theosophical Society. She worked in Bath as a teacher.

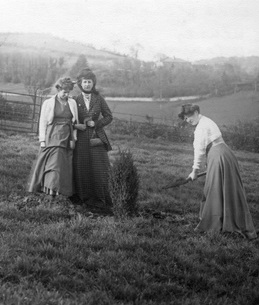
Codd planting tree with Annie Kenney and Florence Canning on 25 April 1909 at Eagle House

Codd was a suffragist and initially joined the National Union of Women's Suffrage Societies (NUWSS), before resigning in April 1908. Codd then joined the more militant Women's Social and Political Union (WSPU). Aeta Lamb asked her to help organise a visit by Christabel Pankhurst and Annie Kenney and the following year she was the elected secretary of the WSPU branch in Bath. Nearby was the home of Mary Blathwayt who was another suffragette. Her parents lived at Eagle House in Batheaston. Nearly all the prominent British suffragettes visited the house and Codd would stay over and sleep in the same bed as Annie Kenney.

Codd was arrested on 13 October 1908 outside the House of Commons after Emmeline Pankhurst, Christabel Pankhurst and Flora Drummond had been arrested for organising "the rush" on parliament. It was the day that parliament was debating the "Women's Enfranchisement Bill". 60,000 people attended the event and she was one of the 37 people arrested. She was sentenced to a month in prison. Christabel Pankhurst was keen to find her a job but Codd refused the offer. In 1909 she planted a tree at Eagle House. She appeared to then drift away from the group.

She worked briefly as a teacher before she became more involved with the Theosophical Society. She then went to their headquarters in Adyar in India for two years. Codd never left this work as she lectured for the society around the world for the rest of her life.

== Death ==
Codd died in Heatherwood Hospital in Ascot, Berkshire, in 1971.

== Works ==
- On Lecturing (1921)
- So Rich a Life (1951)
- The Way of the Disciple (1964)
- The Mystery of Life (1963)
- Trust your Self to Life (1968)
