= Exhibition (scholarship) =

Type of scholarship award or bursary

An exhibition is a type of historical financial scholarship or bursary awarded in the United Kingdom and Ireland, and some Commonwealth countries.

== Purpose ==
An exhibition is historically a small financial award or grant, of lower status than a "scholarship", given to an individual student based normally on grounds of merit or demonstrable necessity. Exhibitions have been used at universities of Dublin, Oxford, Cambridge and Sheffield, as well as some public schools and other UK educational establishments.

The recipient of such an award is known as an exhibitioner (just as a scholar, in this context, is one who has been awarded a scholarship). The term is in decline because financial assistance to students is increasingly given on the grounds of need rather than scholastic merit, and because the value of historically long-standing exhibitions has dwindled due to inflation. Originally, these awards were only made to males. In 1873, Annie Rogers came top in Oxford's entrance examinations and she was automatically qualified for an exhibition at Balliol or Worcester College, Oxford. She was denied the place because she was female. As a consolation prize she was given four volumes of Homer and her place was given to the boy who had come sixth in the tests.

At Oxford and Cambridge, it is typical to be awarded an exhibition for near-first-class performance in examinations; Sheffield's "Petrie Watson Exhibition" is a grant awarded for projects which enhance or complement a current programme of study. The amount is typically less than a scholarship that covers tuition fees and/or maintenance.

The public schools of Westminster, Charterhouse, St Paul's, Winchester, Harrow and Wellington College award exhibitions.
