= Annie Rogers =

British teacher and campaigner

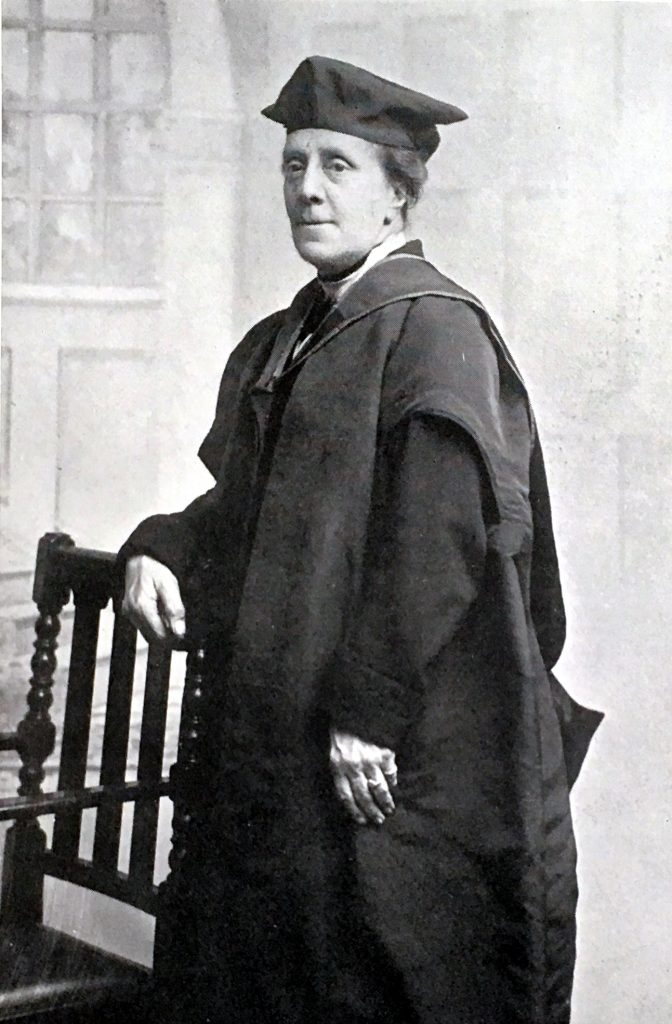
- Rogers receives her Oxford degree in October 1920
- Born: 15 February 1856; Oxford, Oxfordshire, England
- Died: 28 October 1937 (aged 81); Oxford, Oxfordshire, England
- Education: Home tutored
- Occupations: University don and teacher
- Parent(s): Ann and Thorold Rogers

Annie Mary Anne Henley Rogers (15 February 1856 – 28 October 1937) was a British promoter of women's education. She had an offer of a university place at the University of Oxford withdrawn when it was realised that the candidate was female. She proved that she was capable of achieving first-class Oxford University degrees but could not receive a formal degree until 1920. Her work as a home tutor for women students led to her being recognised as a founder of St Anne's College, Oxford. She wrote a history of the admission of women to Oxford University and its degrees, which was published posthumously.

== Life ==
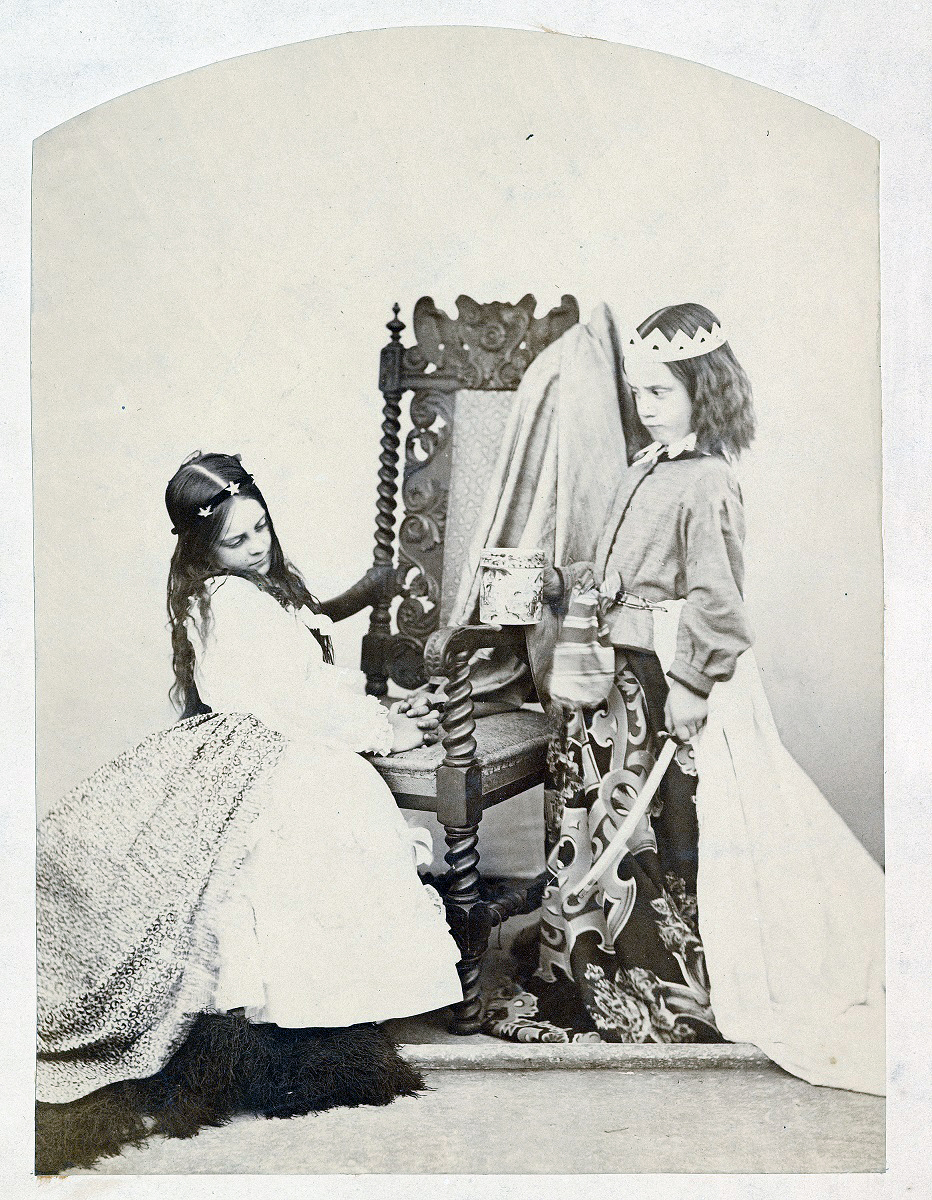
Annie Rogers (r) as Queen Eleanor by Lewis Carroll (1863)

Rogers was born in Oxford to James Edwin Thorold Rogers and his second wife, Ann Susannah Charlotte (née Reynolds). Her father was a campaigner for women's rights and later a Liberal MP. She was the eldest of six children and the only girl. Both her parents supported her academic interests, and it is likely that she was taught ancient languages by her father. They were also personally close; Rogers lived with her mother in a house in St Giles until her mother's death in 1899, when she moved to Museum Road.

She had been a child model for Lewis Carroll in 1863. Carroll took pictures of her in costume and wrote a poem which he sent with a photograph. The poem read

A picture, which I hope will
B one that you will like to
C. If your Mamma should
D sire one like it, I could
E sily get her one.

Rogers came top in the Oxford school examinations in 1873 and was automatically qualified for an exhibition at Balliol or Worcester College. The offer of a university place was withdrawn when it was realised that she was female. However, according to her Oxford Dictionary of National Biography article, her identity was known and the offer was made as a joke. As a consolation prize Balliol gave her volumes of Homer and her place was given to the boy who had come sixth in the tests.

Rogers was able to sit examinations for women at roughly undergraduate level in 1877 and 1879, giving her the equivalent of first-class marks in Latin and Greek and in Ancient History respectively. She was not formally awarded an Oxford degree until 1920 when women became eligible for admission as full members of the university and were given the right to take degrees. In 1879, with the opening of Somerville College and Lady Margaret Hall, Oxford University opened its first halls for women students and Rogers, as the only woman with the equivalent of an Oxford University degree became a don (lecturer). In 1881 she became a Senior Tutor in Classics.

Rogers joined the Association for the Education of Women in Oxford upon its formation in 1879. She was a stalwart member of the Association Committee, attending all but four committee meetings between 1879 and 1920, and eventually becoming the committee's Honorary Secretary after 1894. Vera Brittain praises her work on the committee as demonstrating her to be a "natural tactician." She is also credited with overseeing the end of the ascendancy of the AEW over the women's colleges, which gained in independence as a result.

In 1893, she was teaching Latin at Oxford High School. During the controversy in 1896 over whether women should be awarded degrees at Oxford, she was one of the first women to give evidence before the Hebdomadal Council on whether their exclusion from degrees had limited women's prospects in tuition. In 1897, she wrote a paper titled "The position of women at Oxford and Cambridge" which set out a case for improved funding for women's education. The paper inspired Clara Mordan who in time would fund the new buildings of St Hugh's College, Oxford. Rogers remained a tutor at St Hugh's until 1921, when she resigned this position.

Notably she became secretary of the Society of Oxford Home-Students which would, in 1952, become St Anne's College, Oxford. She was a talented tutor to the women who were studying Classics at home and she is acknowledged as one of the founders of St Anne's College. A half-serious reference at the time of the college's being named 'St Anne's' suggested that it had been named partly after her.

Rogers died in the Radcliffe Infirmary, Oxford in 1937 after being struck by a lorry in St Giles'. She was buried in Wolvercote Cemetery, Oxford, on 1 November. In her memory a garden was laid out to the north of the University Church of St Mary the Virgin, and a stone bench there bears an inscription in her memory. A blue plaque was erected in her memory at her home at 35 St Giles' on 23 September 2020.

Her book Degrees by Degrees was published in 1938; it is subtitled "The Story of the Admission of Oxford Women Students to Membership of the University".
