= Vera Wentworth =

British suffragette

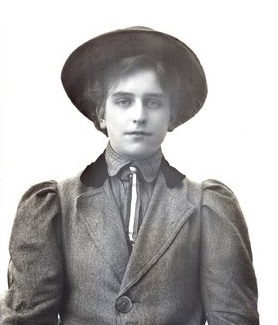
- Born: Jessie Alice Spink (incorrectly attributed to as 'Spinks'); 14 March 1890; St. Margarets, Westminster, London, Middlesex, England
- Died: 5 August 1957 (aged 67); Elizabeth Garrett Anderson Hospital, London, England
- Education: St Andrews University
- Occupations: suffragette, nurse and playwright
- Partner: Daisy Ethel Carden

Vera Wentworth (born Jessie Alice Spink, 14 March 1890 – 5 August 1957) was a British suffragette, nurse and playwright. She notably door-stepped and then assaulted the Prime Minister on two occasions. She was incarcerated for the cause of women's enfranchisement on seven occasions and was force fed, after which she wrote "Three Months in Holloway".

== Early life ==
Wentworth was born in 1890, to Harry Laing Spink and his wife, Rachel Amanda Spink (née Goode). She had one sibling, a brother called William Wilfrid Spink and her father had a chemists shop. After leaving school she found work in a shop going on to become an active trade unionist. In 1907, she formally changed her name to Vera Wentworth, possibly because her parents were embarrassed by her involvement in the suffragette movement. She began living with Caprina Fahey in London.

== Suffrage activism ==
=== Arrests in London ===
In 1908 Wentworth joined the Women's Social and Political Union (WSPU). She was quickly arrested demonstrating outside the House of Commons. Her sentence was six weeks in prison and an extra day was added to Wentworth's sentence after she carved "Votes for Women" into her cell wall with hairpins. Upon release, Wentworth and others were met by Mary Blathwayt, beginning a long friendship between the two women.

Wentworth joined a secret spin-off group called the Young Hot Bloods, which pledged to undertake "danger duty" in the name of women’s suffrage. Of the older suffragettes, only Emmeline Pankhurst was permitted to sit in on their meetings at a tea shop on London’s Strand. Elder suffragist Emily Blathwayt found Wentworth so charming but wayward that she affectionately referred to her as "the young hooligan we know." Rebecca West described her as “a little terror, rather a handsome girl”.

In June she was arrested again for demonstrating outside the House of Commons. This time she was given a three month sentence, after which she published "Should Christian Women Demand the Vote" and "Three Months in Holloway". Wentworth was a writer with an ambition to attend university, and member of the Women Writer's Suffrage League.

=== Visits to Bristol ===
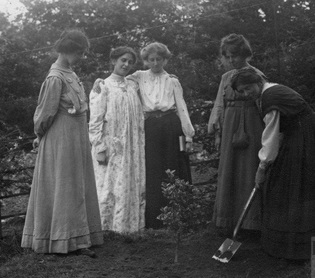
Millicent Browne planting a tree at Eagle House (suffragette's rest) with Mary Phillips, Vera Wentworth, Elsie Howey and Annie Kenney

Wentworth then visited Bristol from Wimbledon in January 1909, to meet other suffragettes including Annie Kenney, Violet Bland, and Elsie Howey. In Bristol, she chalked on pavements to advertise suffragette open air meetings.

Wentworth was invited to Mary Blathwayt's home at Batheaston, where the leading suffragettes met. Significant visitors were asked to plant a tree to record their achievements on behalf of the cause. Wentworth planted a chamaecyparis nutkaensis conifer tree on 4 July 1909. Wentworth was also awarded a Hunger Strike Medal 'for Valour' by the WSPU.

=== Assaults on politicians ===
In March 1909, with Elsie Howey, Vera accosted anti-suffrage Bristol Liberal MP Augustine Birrell at Bristol Temple Meads railway station.

On 5 September 1909 Wentworth, Jessie Kenney and Elsie Howey assaulted Prime Minister H. H. Asquith and the Home Secretary Herbert Gladstone during a golf match. Howey and Wentworth then tried to contact Asquith at his church. They were protesting the imprisonment of Patricia Woodlock and others whilst the Prime Minister was enjoying a holiday, and decorated his private garden bushes with leaflets and cards. Wentworth was sentenced to another three months in prison when she and Howey were arrested for demonstrating outside H. H. Asquith's house.

In November 1909, Wentworth, Mary Sophia Allen, Theresa Garnett, Jessie Lawes and Ellen Pitman protested against Winston Churchill, who had come to Bristol to deliver a speech at Colston Hall opposing votes for women. She threw a fossil with a note attached which read “Women send a fossil to remind Liberal Ministers that they are fossilising, as they are out of touch with present conditions and surroundings.” The five suffragettes were arrested and imprisoned at Horfield Prison. Wentworth was imprisoned for 14 days, was force fed. She later wrote that "at four o’clock on Tuesday afternoon they brought a nasal tube. They forced me onto my bed and six wardresses held me down. I resisted all I could but it was impossible to hold out against them. That was done twice a day until I came out." The Daily Western Press reported that "the assault on Mr Churchill created a considerable sensation, not only in Bristol, but also through the country."

These direct actions proved too much for the Blathwayt family. Emily resigned from the WSPU and Linley wrote letters of protest to Christabel Pankhurst, Elsie Howey and Wentworth. Pankhurst was told that Howey and Wentworth could not visit their house again. Wentworth sent them a long reply expressing regret at their reaction but noting that "if Mr. Asquith will not receive deputation they will pummel him again."

During this period her brother, an eighteen-year-old journalist who had been the leader of an unsuccessful unofficial strike of women workers in the East End of London, introduced her to politician Fenner Brockway, who called Wilfie Spink his "explosive friend" and stated that she became his girlfriend. However, as the WSPU increased in the use of more violent action he distanced himself from them, as he was a pacifist, and all personal acquaintances appear to have ended by around 1910.

=== Play and education ===
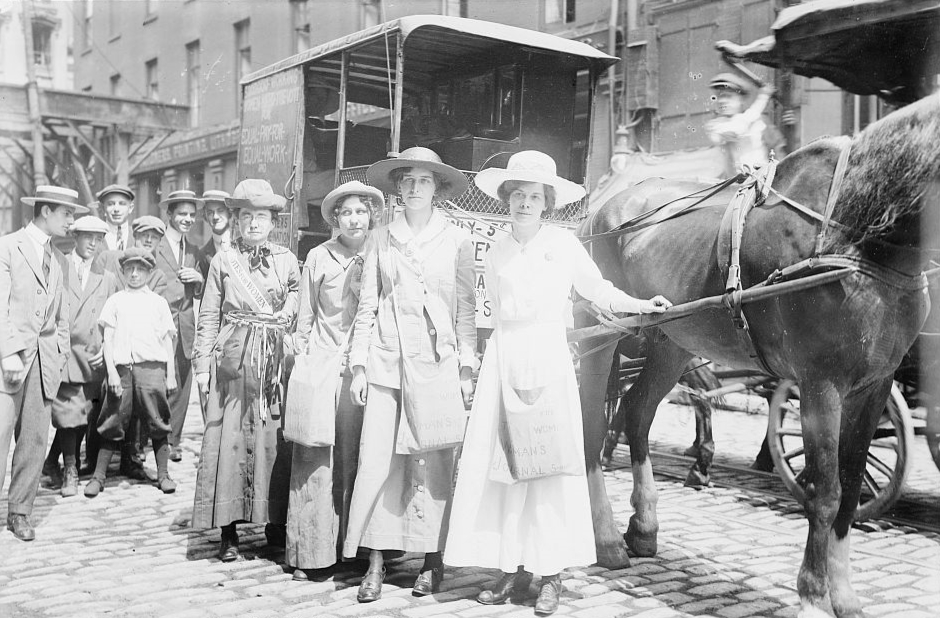
New York, August 1913. "Suffragettes on hike to Boston." Front to back - Elsie McKenzie, Elisabeth Freeman, Vera Wentworth and "Colonel" Ida Craft (with sash). 'Asquith' the horse pulled the caravan. According to contemporary reports he needed much urging, hence his name!

Wentworth achieved her ambition of attending a university when she started at St Andrews University in 1912 and studied there until 1914. Whilst studying she wrote the one-act suffrage play An Allegory. In March 1912, Wentworth took part in a West End window smashing campaign. Whilst she was imprisoned in Holloway Prison her play was performed by suffragette prisoners, directed by Emmeline Pethick-Lawrence.

=== Suffrage hike in America ===
On 6 August 1913 Wentworth, with Elisabeth Freeman and Elsie McKenzie were in America to support "Colonel" Ida Craft of the Yankee Corps on a suffrage hike from New York to Boston, via Stamford, Norwalk, Bridgeport, Milford, New Haven, Wallingford, Meriden, New Britain, Hartford, Marlboro, Waltham to Harvard Square, Cambridge, Massachusetts arriving on 30 August. Finally, on Labour Day, 1 September 1913, they departed at 11 am with other suffragists, to hold a meeting on Boston Common at 12.30 pm.

During the hike, Wentworth was ordered to police headquarters in Hartford, Connecticut, accused of violating city ordinances.

== World War I ==
On 4 August 1914 World War I began. The WSPU did a deal with government and they agreed to end all protests in return for having all of their prisoners released. Wentworth respected this line and ceased work with the WSPU.

From 1914 to 1918 she enrolled in the Queen Mary's Army Auxiliary Corps as an Assistant Administrator, and then became an administrator 1918–1920. Following this she resided in Hendon, Middlesex with Daisy Carden. She later joined League for Peace.

During World War II, Wentworth worked in London in the Air Raid precautions.

== Daisy Carden ==
Vera met Daisy Ethel Carden (1896-1992), a former pupil of Cheltenham Ladies’ College, in the 1920s through the Christian pacifist Peace Pledge Union. They remained partners for life. In 1939 they were living in St Pancras, London, with Vera described as ‘Authoress’ and Daisy as ‘Hospital Clerk’.

== Death ==
Wentworth died in Elizabeth Garrett Anderson Hospital in London in 1957. She bequeathed all her assets to Daisy Carden in her will, who outlived her by 35 years.
