= Old Burlington Street =

Street in the City of Westminster, London

Coordinates: 51.5106°N 0.1409°W

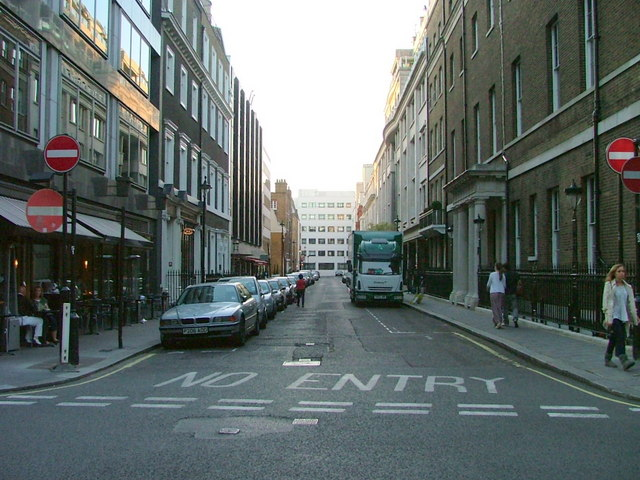
Old Burlington Street looking north.

Old Burlington Street is a street in Westminster, central London, on land that was once part of the Burlington Estate.

== Location ==
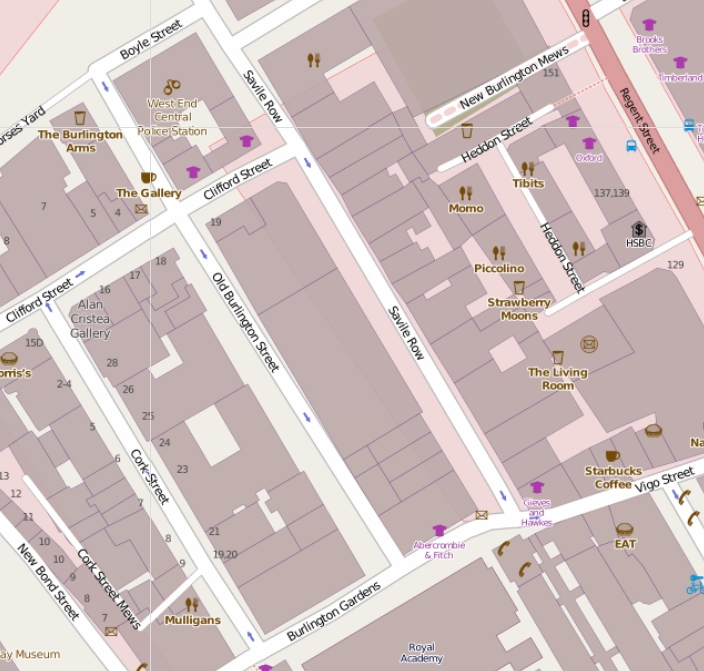
The position of Old Burlington Street in Westminster.

The street runs north–south from Boyle Street to Burlington Gardens and is crossed only by Clifford Street.

== History ==
According to parish rate books, the street was built by 1729 and known then as Nowell Street. That name was replaced by Burlington in 1733 and it was at one time known as Great Burlington Street.

Charles Dartiquenave was living in the street in 1729.

Lord Hervey, the object of savage satire by Alexander Pope, in whose works he figured as Lord Fanny, Sporus, Adonis and Narcissus, lived in the street until he sold his house in 1730.

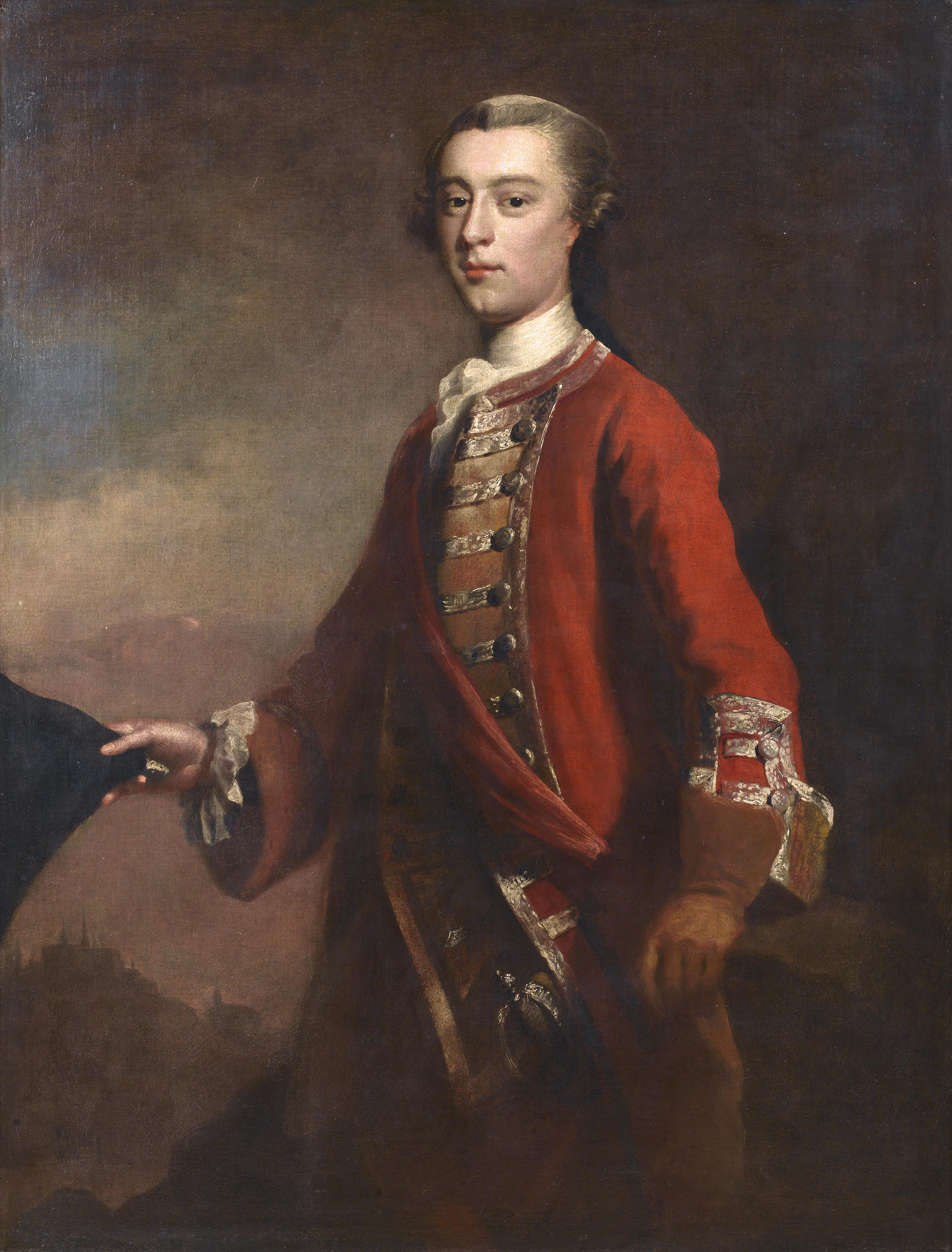
James Wolfe, later General Wolfe, lived in the street as a young officer.

James Wolfe, later General Wolfe, lived in the street as a junior officer in 1743 and 1744.

Mark Akenside, physician and poet and author of The Pleasures of the Imagination lived in the street from 1762 until his death in 1770.

During the corn riots of 1815, a mob attacked number 15, the home of The Hon. Frederick (Prosperity) Robinson MP, tore up the railings outside and battered down the front door. Soldiers inside fired on the crowd and killed a midshipman named Edward Vyse. Three soldiers and Robinson's butler James Ripley were charged with Wilful Murder. No. 15 was later occupied by Lewis Durlacher (1792-1864), a chiropodist who was appointed as surgeon-chiropodist to the royal household in 1823 and served under George IV, William IV and Queen Victoria and later by his son Montague Durlacher (1824-1894), who succeeded his father Lewis in the role of surgeon-chiropodist to the royal household.

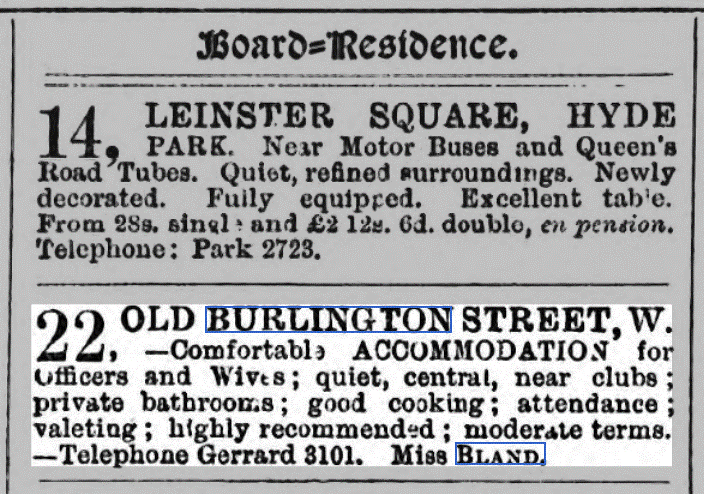
Advert for accommodation placed by Suffragette Violet Bland in the Army and Navy Gazette, 1916

Suffragette Violet Bland ran a guest house at 22 Old Burlington Street for around 25 years from 1910.

Samuel Cartwright (1788-1864), Dentist in Ordinary to George IV, lived at and ran his practice from 32 Old Burlington Street.

Sir Richard Croft (1762-1818), a famous accoucheur, lived in Old Burlington Street. He attended the Prince Regent's daughter, Princess Charlotte Augusta of Wales, during her labour in November 1817. She gave birth to a stillborn son and died a few hours later. Sir Richard Croft later committed suicide on 13 February 1818.

No. 29 was occupied by Sir Charles Asgill, 2nd Baronet between 1778-1785. At a later date the house was occupied by Lord Cornwallis (in whose army Asgill served during the American Revolution), until his death in October 1805. His son, the 2nd Marquess Cornwallis, died there, in 1823. The building subsequently became the Burlington Hotel, which included an adjoining property. "Nos. 29 and 30 continued to be used as an hotel, together with the Cork Street buildings, until the 1930's. Among its notable residents had been Florence Nightingale. She had first come with her family to take rooms for the season in 1842, and later at the height of her fame in 1857 made it the 'little War Office' where she directed the movement for the reform of the Army medical services".

== Listed buildings ==
Old Burlington Street contains a number of historic buildings.

Number 1, also known as 7 Burlington Gardens is on the corner with Burlington Gardens and was built in 1721–23 to designs by the Italian architect Giacomo Leoni. It was first occupied by the Duke of Queensberry, and the poet John Gay also lived there. It was originally known as Queensberry House, but became Uxbridge House after the Earl of Uxbridge bought it in 1785. From 1785 to 1789, it was enlarged and altered for Lord Uxbridge by the architects John Vardy the Younger and Joseph Bonomi the Elder. It later became home to the Marquess of Anglesey, the Bank of England and the Royal Bank of Scotland. It is now an Abercrombie & Fitch store, the first in Europe.

Numbers 2, 22 and 23, 24a, 31 and 32 are all listed buildings with English Heritage.

== Shops in Old Burlington Street ==
- Drakes. Tailors.
- Julien Macdonald. Fashion designer. No. 31.
- Ozwald Boateng.

== See also ==
- New Burlington Street
