= Aeta Lamb =

British suffragette

Aeta Adelaide Lamb
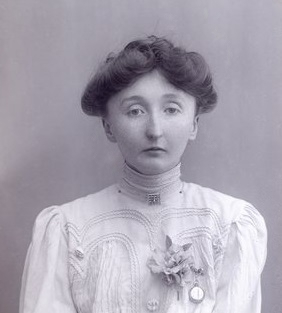
- Lamb in 1911
- Born: Aeta Adelaide Lamb; 1886; Demerara
- Died: June 1928 (aged 41–42); Elizabeth Garrett Anderson and Obstetric Hospital, London, England

Aeta Adelaide Lamb (1886 – June 1928) was one of the longest serving organisers in the Women's Social and Political Union (WSPU), the leading militant organisation campaigning for Women's suffrage in the United Kingdom.

== Early life and education ==
Lamb was born in Demerara in British Guiana, and named after a palm that her father, the botanist William Davis Lamb, had discovered there. Her father died when she was a child, and Aeta, her two siblings and her mother Adelaide, daughter of General Henry Nicoll, CB returned to live in Britain. She attended Notting Hill High School between 1898 and 1899.

== WPSU work ==
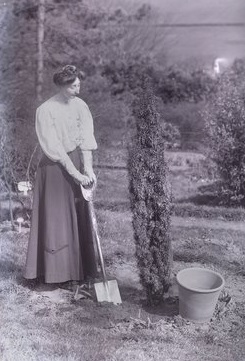
In 1911 at Eagle House Aeta Lamb planted a tree to celebrate her imprisonment. The picture was taken by Colonel Linley Blathwayt

Lamb joined the Women's Social and Political Union in 1906. She was noted to be very eloquent and she wrote some of Christabel Pankhurst's speeches while working in its information department, even being said to be the 'real brains' behind some of Pankhurst's best known rhetoric. In October 1906 Lamb took part in a deputation to the House of Commons and was arrested, but ultimately released after her mother paid her fine. Despite this, she took part in another deputation in February/March 1907, and another in October 1908, resulting in prison terms of a week, then a month, served in Holloway Prison.

In July she assisted with by-election campaign in North West Staffordshire in July alongside Annie Kenney and in August worked in Bury St Edmunds alongside Emmeline Pankhurst. Following this she was appointed as a national WSPU organiser in October 1907 while working with Kenney in Bristol. Lamb was arrested with Patricia Woodlock and Emily Sproson and over 50 others, reported in the Evening Express.

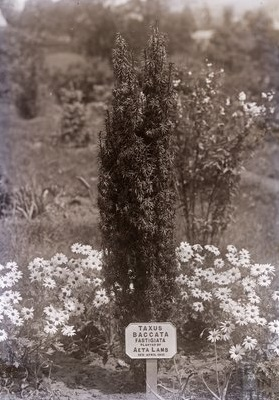
Aeta Lamb's 1911 Eagle House tree - Taxus Baccata Fastigiata

In January 1908, Lamb was again assisting Emmeline Pankhurst, this time at the Mid-Devon by-election, and then at the Herefordshire (Ross) by election. From there she was one of the main organisers the first meeting of the Bath branch of the WSPU in April 1908. It was here also that she got to know the Blathwayt family of Eagle House, Batheaston, which they operated as a home of refuge for suffragettes between 1908 and 1912. In 1911, Lamb was one of the last WSPU members to go there, planting a commemorative tree in their arboretum which they had named the 'Suffragette's Rest', before the Blathwayts withdrew their support due to the growing militancy of the organisation.

In April 1908 Lamb supported Mary Gawthorpe in the Kincardineshire by-election campaign, after which she went on to help in the Montrose Burghs, Dundee and Stirling Burghs by-election campaigns in May, and then another in Pudsey in June 1908.

After these campaigns, her health and stamina began to fail, so she returned to London to work at the WSPU headquarters at Clement's Inn until the outbreak of the World War I, becoming one of its longest serving organisers. One of her last duties was to draw up a list of suffragette prisoners for use in the campaign - by the time of its completion it contained over 1,200 documents relevant to the arrest of over 450 suffragettes.

Lamb remained loyal to the WSPU throughout its campaign, despite developing increasing misgivings of its policies of violent protest over the course of her time with them.

== Later career and death ==
During the First World War she worked in War Depots, and afterwards was largely unsuccessful in finding gainful employment, despite learning shorthand, typing, and even cookery.

Aeta Lamb died of cancer at the Elizabeth Garrett Anderson Hospital at the age of 41 years in June 1928.

== Other sources ==
1. Pankhurst, Silvia (1935). The Suffragette Movement - An Intimate Account Of Persons And Ideals. Lovat Dickson & Thompson. ISBN 978-1409400431.
2. Aeta Lamb biography (by Vera Douie) in The Suffragette Fellowship Collection, Museum of London
