= Francis Browning =

Irish cricketer

Cricket information
- Batting: Right-handed

International information
- National side: Ireland

Career statistics
Competition	First-class
Matches	11
Runs scored	363
Batting average	18.15
100s/50s	0/1
Top score	56
Catches/stumpings	9/4
- Source: CricketArchive, 6 December 2022

Francis Henry Browning (23 June 1868 – 26 April 1916) was an Irish cricketer and President of the Irish Rugby Football Union. He was a right-handed batsman and a wicket-keeper.

Frank Browning was born in Dublin, Ireland. He made his debut for Ireland in August 1888 against Scotland, and went on to play for Ireland 38 times, his last game coming against Philadelphia in September 1909. Eleven of his games for Ireland had first-class status.

Outside cricket, he was a barrister-at-law. He became president of the Irish Rugby Football Union in 1912. Browning raised and commanded the Irish Rugby Football Union Volunteer Corps and was second in command of the Irish Association of Volunteer Training Corps.

He was killed in the Easter Rising of 1916 while serving with the part-time Volunteer Training Corps (a form of Home Guard). On Easter Monday the VTC unit he had formed were on an exercise in the Dublin mountains when they received news of the outbreak of the Rising in the city. Their return route led them across the narrow Mount Street Bridge (Conyngham Bridge) where the men of the 1 (Dublin) battalion VTC in civilian clothes with arm-bands and carrying rifles but not ammunition, came under fire from an Irish Volunteer position at 25 Northumberland Road. Seven of them were wounded, four - including Browning - fatally - before firing ceased.

Browning was taken to Beggars Bush Barracks and then to Baggot Street Hospital where he died two days later, aged 47. He thus became the only first-class cricketer to die in the Easter Rising. The inscription on his gravestone, erected by the IRFU in Dublin's Deans Grange Cemetery includes the wording, "He will live in the memory of all as an honourable comrade and distinguished sportsman."

== See also ==
- List of Irish cricket and rugby union players
