= Eagle House (suffragette's rest) =

Historically important house in England

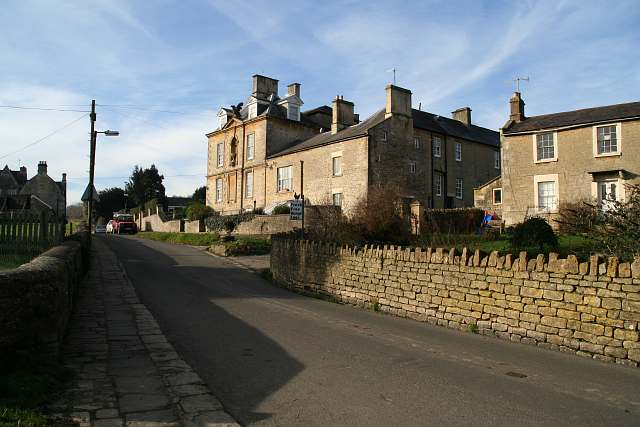
- Eagle House in 2010

- Location within Somerset

General information
- Location: Batheaston, England, United Kingdom
- Coordinates: 51°24′49″N 2°19′06″W

Design and construction
- Designations: Grade II listed

Eagle House is a Grade II* listed building in Batheaston, Somerset, near Bath. Before World War I the house had extensive grounds.

When Emily Blathwayt and her husband Colonel Linley Blathwayt owned the house, its summerhouse was used, from 1909 to 1912, as a refuge for suffragettes who had been released from prison after hunger strikes. It became known as the Suffragette's Rest or Suffragette's Retreat. Emily Blathwayt was a suffragette and member of the Women's Social and Political Union.

Between April 1909 and July 1911, trees were planted in the grounds to commemorate individual suffragettes, and at least 47 were planted in a 2-acre (0.81 ha) site. Known as Annie's Arboretum, after Annie Kenney, the trees were destroyed in the 1960s when a housing estate was built. Only one tree remains, an Austrian pine planted in 1909 by Rose Lamartine Yates.

== Architecture and history ==
The two-storey Bath stone house has ashlar quoins and a slate roof. There is an Ionic doorcase with columns either side supporting a pediment. The south side is of five bays while the east has three. The interior includes an 18th-century staircase and fireplace. In the garden is a former chapel with an early 19th-century window featuring tracery.

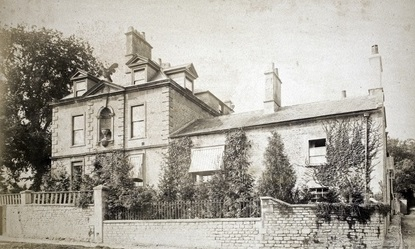
Eagle House c. 1890

The house was built in the late 17th or early 18th century, then remodelled in 1724 and again in 1729 by the architect John Wood, the Elder as his own house. The house was later associated with his son John Wood, the Younger.

In 1882, Eagle House became home to Colonel Linley Blathwayt, his wife Emily, and their children William and Mary Blathwayt. Linley Blathwayt had been a colonel in the army in India and moved into the house when he retired. He had interests in insects and in photography. Emily Blathwayt's interest was in the garden and they had an extensive library of books, including hundreds on botany and nature.

== Women's suffrage ==
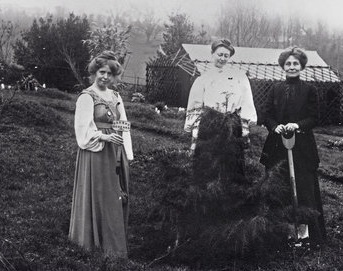
Annie Kenney to the left, Mary Blathwayt at centre and Emmeline Pankhurst, with the spade, at Eagle House in 1910

Emily and Mary Blathwayt began attending meetings of the Bath Women's Suffrage Society. In 1906 they gave three shillings to the Women's Social and Political Union (WSPU). Mary met Annie Kenney at a Women's Social and Political Union meeting in Bath, and she agreed to help Kenney, Elsie Howey, Clara Codd and Mary Phillips organise a local women's suffrage campaign. Mary was given an allowance by her family to support her in her work for women's rights.

On 28 April 1909, Emily Blathwayt wrote in her diary that "the idea of a field of trees grows". The site chosen was a two-acre field on the side of Solsbury Hill. This was not to be a simple wood or even an arboretum, but a peaceful place for recovering women to walk and relax. They planted individual trees, holly trees to celebrate women working for the cause whereas those militant women who had been imprisoned were celebrated with a particular conifer. Each had a different species and floral rings were planted around each tree. The planting was achieved by a visit from the suffragette who then posed, often with one of the Blathwayts, by a purpose-made lead plaque. That was photographed by Colonel Linley and he would also capture a portrait of the suffragette. The portraits were signed and card versions sold at the WSPU shop in Bath. Mary Blathwayt's own diary also includes details of the sexual relationships between some participants of the movement which took place at Eagle House.

Eagle House became an important refuge for suffragettes who had been released from prison after hunger strikes. Each tree was planted to commemorate each woman – at least 47 trees were planted between April 1909 and July 1911, including Emmeline Pankhurst, Christabel Pankhurst, Annie Kenney, Charlotte Despard, Millicent Fawcett and Lady Lytton.

Key activists from the suffragette movement were invited to stay at her house and to plant a tree to celebrate a prison sentence, or to mark having been on hunger strike. The trees were known as "Annie's Arboretum" after Kenney, who planted the first one. There was also a "Pankhurst Pond" within the grounds.

When Vera Wentworth and Elsie Howey assaulted H. H. Asquith (the Prime Minister), it proved too much for the Blathwayt family. They were also distressed by arson and other attacks on property carried out by the suffragettes, including one near Eagle House. Emily Blathwayt resigned from the WSPU and Linley Blathwayt wrote letters of protest to Christabel Pankhurst, Howey and Wentworth. Pankhurst was told that Howey and Wentworth could not visit their house again. Wentworth sent them a long reply expressing regret at their reaction but noting that "if Mr. Asquith will not receive deputation they will pummel him again".

== Annie's Arboretum listing ==
This list was translated from the German Wikipedia which refers to the online archive of Bath in Time which shows the layout, images of individual women and their trees. The list is reproduced here:

- Laura Ainsworth (1885–1958) planted a blue-green cultivar of Lawson's cypress ( Cupressus lawsoniana 'Wisselii' ) on 30 April 1911.
- Lady Elizabeth 'Betty' Balfour (1867–1942) planted a cultivated form of the European holly ( Ilex aquifolium 'Scotch Gold Holly' ) on 11 February 1910.
- Georgina Brackenbury (1865–1949) planted a yellow Monterey cypress ( Cupressus macrocarpa 'Lutea' ) on 22 July 1909.
- Marie Brackenbury (1866–1950) planted a cultivated form of Lawson's cypress ( Cupressus lawsoniana 'Filifera' ) on 22 July 1909.
- Millicent Browne (1881–1975) planted a variegated variety of European holly ( Ilex aquifolium 'Argentea Marginata' ) on 4 July 1909.
- Florence Canning (died 1914) planted a yellow-leaved variety of Lawson's cypress ( Cupressus lawsoniana 'Aureo-Variegata' ) on 25 April 1909.
- Clara Codd (1877–1971) planted a columnar yew on 25 April 1909 ( Taxus baccata 'Fastigiata').
- Nellie Crocker (1872–1962) planted a magnificent fir ( Abies magnifica ) on 7 February 1911.
- Charlotte Despard (1844–1939) planted a variegated type of European holly ( Ilex aquifolium 'Argentea Medio-Picta' ) on 17 January 1911.
- Una Dugdale (1879–1975) planted a Chilean araucaria on 7 February 1911 (Araucaria imbricata).
- Millicent Fawcett (1847–1929) planted a large-fruited variety of European holly ( Ilex aquifolium 'Macrocarpa') on 3 July 1910.
- Theresa Garnett (1888–1966) planted a gold yew on 7 November 1909 ( Taxus baccata 'Elegantissima').
- Margaret Hewitt planted a white-fringed variety of the European holly (Ilex aquifolium 'Albo Marginata') on 3 October 1909
- Vera Holme (1881–1969) planted a variegated variety of European holly (Ilex aquifolium 'Aurea Marginata') on 9 May 1909.
- Elsie Howey (1884–1963) planted a Nordmann fir (Abies nordmanniana) on 2 May 1909.
- Maud Joachim (1869–1947) planted a Hiba tree of life (Thujopsis dolabrata) on 17 June 1910.
- Winifred Jones (died 1955) planted a Colorado fir ( Abies concolor) on 2 July 1911.
- Gladice Keevil (1884–1959) planted the blue spruce species (Picea pungens 'Kosteriana') on 4 November 1910.
- Annie Kenney (1879–1953) planted a silvery cultivated form of the false cypress (Cupressus lawsoniana 'Silver Queen') on 23 April 1909.
- Caroline "Kitty" Kenney (1880–1952) planted a variegated variety of European holly (Ilex aquifolium 'Aurea Picta Crispa') on 25 August 1910.
- Jessica "Jessie" Kenney (1887–1985) planted a maned juniper (Juniperus virginiana 'Pendula') on 9 May 1909.
- Aeta Lamb (1886–1928) planted a columnar yew on 16 April 1911 ( Taxus baccata 'Fastigiata' ).
- Lady Constance Lytton (1869–1923) planted a blue cypress (Chamaecyparis alumii) on 23 April 1909.
- Charlotte Marsh (1887–1961) planted a spruce (Picea polita) on 5 March 1911.
- Clara Mordan (1844–1915) planted a variegated variety of European holly on 27 February 1910 (Ilex aquifolium ( English small leaved silver holly ) ).
- Marie Naylor (1850–1940) planted a rocky mountain fir on 9 April 1910 (Abies subalpina).
- Adela Pankhurst (1885–1961) planted a yellow Himalayan cedar (Cedrus deodara 'Aurea') on 3 July 1910.
- Christabel Pankhurst (1880–1958) planted a Lebanon cedar (Cedrus libani) on 6 November 1910.
- Emmeline Pankhurst (1858–1928) planted a Himalayan cedar (Cedrus deodora) on 16 April 1910.
- Alice Perkins (1865–1948) planted a variegated variety of European holly (Ilex aquifolium 'Aurea Regina') on 4 September 1910.
- Emmeline Pethick-Lawrence (1867–1954) planted a giant tree of life (Thuja lobbii) on 23 April 1909.
- Mary Phillips planted a blue spruce (Picea pungens 'Glauca') on 4 July 1909.
- Katherine Douglas Smith planted a mountain Douglas fir (Pseudotsuga menziesii 'Glauca') on 18 February 1910.
- Marion Wallace-Dunlop (1865–1942) planted a mountain hemlock on 11 June 1910 (Tsuga mertensiana).
- Helen Kirkpatrick Watts (1881–1972) planted a common juniper (Juniperus communis) on 17 March 1911.
- Vera Wentworth (1890–1957) planted a Nootka cypress (Chamaecyparis nootkatensis) on 4 July 1909.
- Edith Wheelwright (1868–1949) planted the holly variety Ilex aquifolium 'Handsworthensis' on 10 October 1910.
- Lillian Dove Willcox (1875–1963) planted a Caucasian spruce (Picea orientalis) in 1910.
- Rose Lamartine Yates (1875–1954) planted an Austrian black pine (Pinus nigra nigra) on 30 October 1909.

== Legacy ==
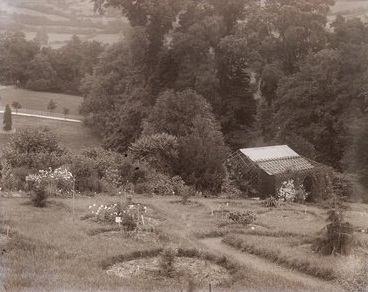
Annie's Arboretum at Eagle House, with the Suffragettes' Rest summerhouse in the background c.1910

The Town and Country Planning Act 1947 contained provision for woodland of historic importance to be preserved but the importance of the arboretum site was never identified. In fact, the Somerset Archaeological Society was consulted over a planning application and noted that the grounds were "not very attractive". In 1961, the Local Planning Authority overruled local objections which did not mention the garden. The house was kept but its contents were auctioned. They included a Boadicea brooch given by Annie Kenney to Mary Blathwayt. The garden did not go completely unnoticed, because a local journalist noted that the contents of the house were unimportant when compared to the suffragette's garden.

In about 1965, the trees in "Annie's Arboretum" were removed to make way for a housing estate. Helen Watts wrote one of the last known accounts of "Annie's Arboretum" at Eagle House. She returned to see the spot where she was honoured in 1911. She visited in 1962 and took another sprig of juniper as a souvenir, having carried one with her for fifty years, she said. The local newspaper reported that she could not find her plaque but she did find "stout trees" and, with the aid of Colonel Blathwayt's photo, she identified "her" juniper.

Only one of the trees, an Austrian Pine, remains, planted by Rose Lamartine Yates in 1909. In 2011, it was announced that the trees would be replaced by new ones at the Royal Victoria Park, Bath, Alice Park and Bath Spa University.

In 2018, herbaria leaves, at least 100 years old, from pressed branches of five trees from Annie's Arboretum were identified in the archives of the University of East Anglia. They include samples from the trees planted by Annie Kenney, Lady Constance Lytton and Christabel Pankhurst. The archives had had them donated in 1994 by Kenney's family. Specialists from Kew Gardens advised how the branches could be preserved. The University of East Anglia intended to produce an online anthology with writers, schoolchildren and students from Norfolk, on the life stories of the women whose memorial trees in Annie's Arboretum had been lost. Eagle House has been divided into four apartments.
