= Elsie Howey =

English suffragette (1884–1963)

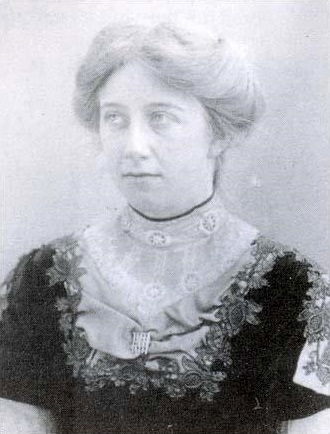
- Born: Rose Elsie Neville Howey; 1 December 1884; Finningley, Nottinghamshire, England
- Died: 13 March 1963 (aged 78); Malvern, Worcestershire, England
- Education: University of St Andrews
- Occupation: Suffragette
- Organization: Women's Social and Political Union

Rose Elsie Neville Howey (1 December 1884 – 13 March 1963), known as Elsie Howey, was an English suffragette. She was a militant activist with the Women's Social and Political Union and was jailed at least six times between 1908 and 1912.

== Early life ==
Rose Elsie Neville Howey was born in Finningley in 1884 to Thomas Howey, the parish's rector, and Emily Gertrude (née Oldfield). When her father died in 1887, the family moved to Malvern, Worcestershire. In 1902 Howey began studying English, French and German at the University of St Andrews in Fife, Scotland. She left the university in 1904 so that she could travel to Germany, where she first came into contact with the women's rights movement.

== Activism ==
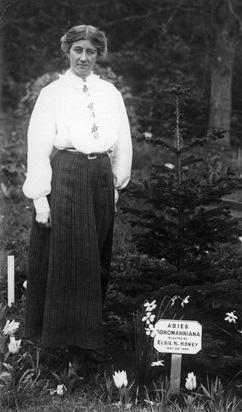
In 1909 Howey was invited to, Eagle House, the home of Mary Blathwayt to plant a Nordmann Fir. The honour was given to leading suffragists

Howey joined the Women's Social and Political Union (WSPU), a militant suffrage organisation, in 1907

In February 1908, she and her sister, Mary Gertrude Howey, were arrested alongside other WSPU members after hiding in a pantechnicon van that was driven into the House of Commons. After her release, she joined Annie Kenney and Mary Blathwayt to campaign at a by-election in Shropshire in May 1908. Soon afterwards, she was imprisoned again for three months for protesting outside the home of then-Prime Minister H. H. Asquith. She was sentenced to six weeks in jail. Her demonstrations became more daring, including hiding overnight in the organ at Colston Hall in Bristol before Augustine Birrell, MP was due to speak, assisted by Vera Holme inside and Minnie Baldock.

She went further on 5 September 1910, when Howey and two other suffragettes, Vera Wentworth and Jessie Kenney, assaulted Prime Minister Asquith and Herbert Gladstone while the men were playing golf, and pursued Asquith to his holiday home, left protest cards, saying "Release Patricia Woodlock" and other suffragette materials in his private garden. Howey's violent tactics were criticised by some other members of the WSPU who called for her removal from the union. The actions proved too much for Mary Blathwayt's family. Her mother, Emily, resigned from the WSPU and her father, Linley, wrote letters of protest to Christabel Pankhurst, Howey and Wentworth. Pankhurst was told that Howey and Wentworth could not visit their house again. Wentworth sent them a long reply expressing regret at their reaction but noting that "if Mr. Asquith will not receive deputation they will pummel him again".

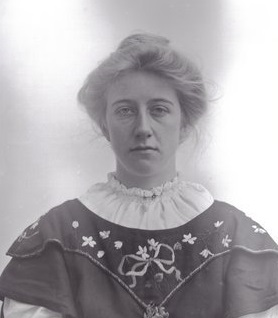
Howey in 1909

From 1910, Howey campaigned for the WSPU in Liverpool. On 14 January 1910, Lady Constance Bulwer-Lytton was imprisoned and forcibly fed at Walton Gaol. In response, Howey broke the gaol governor's windows so that she too would be jailed in support of Lytton. Lytton in turn called Howey "valiant" and the "most dear one of our members".

In April 1910, Howey received national attention after leading "a WSPU demonstration through London dressed as Joan of Arc, in a full set of armour" while riding on a white horse. Leading suffragist Emmeline Pethick-Lawrence wrote that Howey as Joan of Act carried "an oriflamme of purple, white and green," the suffragette colours. The role was also played by nineteen year old actress Marjery Bryce.

In July Howey was arrested again for demonstrating in Penzance in Cornwall. She was imprisoned for seven days, during which time she undertook a hunger strike and fasted for 144 hours. Later in 1910 Howey worked to introduce the suffrage movement to Plymouth and Torquay.

When the 1911 census was taken, she participated in the suffragette boycott of the census and refused to be enumerated, writing "Votes for Women" on her form.

Howey was jailed at least six times in her career as a suffragette. She often took hunger strikes in prison and endured forcible feeding; on one such occasion it took her four months to recover from the resultant throat injuries. Her last arrest was in December 1912 after setting off a fire alarm. She was sentenced to four months' imprisonment but was released early after a prolonged hunger strike that resulted in the breakage of almost all of her teeth from forcible feeding.

Howey was awarded a Hunger Strike Medal 'for Valour' by the WSPU.

== Later life ==
Howey retired from public life when the militant suffrage movement ended in 1914. She lived in Malvern for the rest of her life and died there in 1963 from chronic pyloric stenosis. The condition is very rare in adults. It was probably caused by her multiple episodes of forcible feeding.
