= Emily Blathwayt =

British suffragette (1852–1940)

Emily Marion Blathwayt
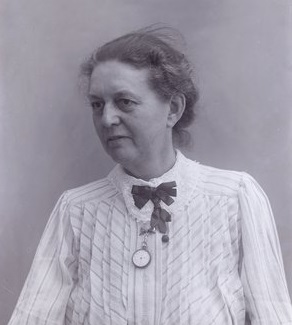
- Emily Blathwayt in 1911
- Born: Emily Marion Rose; 1852
- Died: 1940 (aged 87–88)
- Known for: British suffragette who created a retreat at Eagle House.
- Spouse: Linley Blathwayt (m. 1874–1919) his death

Emily Marion Blathwayt (née Rose; 1852 – 1940) was a British suffragette and mother of Mary Blathwayt. She and her husband, Linley, a retired Colonel from the Indian Army lived at Eagle House in Somerset and established a welcome and garden summerhouse for women in the movement, that became known as the "Suffragette's Rest".

== Early life ==
Emily Marion Blathwayt was born in about 1852. Her father was John Benson Coles Rose. She married her first cousin, Colonel Linley Blathwayt in 1874 and they lived in India. Linley was an army officer and their first child John Linley was born in 1876. They returned to live in Sussex in 1877 after John died. They moved from there to Eagle House, Batheaston, on the outskirts of Bath in 1892 with their son William and daughter Mary.

They had two children, the elder daughter Mary attended Bath High School and then was supported at home as she became an active member of the suffragette movement and the younger, son William, was an electrical engineer and English teacher in Germany until the start of the First World War.

== Campaigning for women's suffrage ==
Both Emily and Mary became affiliated to the Women's Social and Political Union (WSPU). Through a network of connections, people from the suffragette movement were invited to stay with Emily and her family to recover from a prison sentence or hunger strike and whilst there to plant a tree in the Eagle House garden to mark their suffering for this cause.

Annie Kenney met Mary Blathwayt at a WPSU meeting in Bath and came to stay with the family, along with several other suffragettes who joined them for short periods over a number of years. The memorial trees planted (over 40 trees) became known as 'Annie's Arbour'. Suffragettes recuperated in the purpose built summer-house Emily's husband, Linley, created at Eagle House (suffragette's rest). Emily would take people on tours of the gardens and planted and showed flowers in the suffragette colours.

Emily Blathwayt recorded in her diary which is in the public archives:

"Elsie Howey, Vera Wentworth and Mary Phillips were arrested at Exeter and imprisoned for a week and it is said they are going through the hunger strike as the 14 have done. The crowds were with them outside Lord Carrington's meeting and all resisted police and two working men were arrested. The women would not pay the fine."

== Resignation from the Women's Social and Political Union ==
Later in the campaign, other actions by Vera Wentworth and Elsie Howey (who had stayed with the Blathwayts) were considered violent towards the Prime Minister, leading to Emily herself resigning from the WSPU, and her husband Linley writing to them both to object to this approach and also complaining to Christabel Pankhurst at the violence arising in the movement. Despite their real concerns about the physical damage to property and the risk to hurting innocent people, the Blathwayts continued to support their daughter's activism and to welcome suffragette visitors and support the eventual achievement of votes for women.

Personal activities and a private view of the suffragette movement from Emily's family perspective gives us an insight which adds depth to that usually in the public domain or the press of the time.

== Death and legacy ==
Emily Blathwayt lived at Eagle House until her death in 1940. The archive of Emily's and Mary's personal diaries and the many photographs by Linley remain as an intimate record of the movement and its supporters. The trees that were planted at Eagle House were removed to make way for a housing estate. Other trees have been planted along with replacements for lost memorials. An art work was created to note the impact of Eagle House and of Annie Kenney (hosted by Emily Blathwayt) created by artist Jeni Wood in 2016.

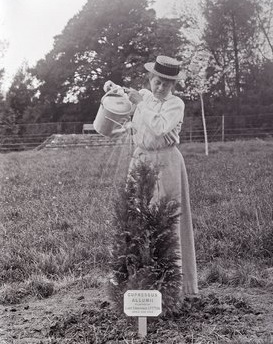
Emily Blathwayt watering a tree in 1909 at Eagle House

== See also ==
- Women's Social and Political Union.
- Suffragette
- Women's suffrage in the United Kingdom
