= Mary Blathwayt =

British feminist, suffragette and social reformer

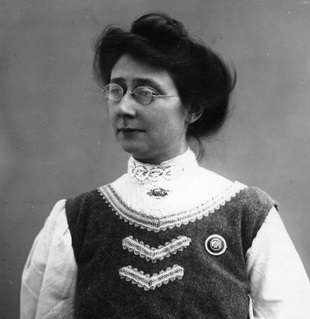
- Blathwayt in 1909
- Born: 1 February 1879; Worthing, Sussex, England
- Died: 25 June 1961 (aged 82)
- Known for: Suffragette and social reformer
- Parents: Colonel Linley Blathwayt (father); Emily Marion Rose (mother)

Mary Blathwayt (1 February 1879 – 25 June 1961) was a British feminist, suffragette and social reformer. She lived at Eagle House in Somerset. This house became known as the "Suffragette's Rest" and contained a memorial to the protests of 60 suffragists and suffragettes. The memorial was bulldozed in the 1960s.

== Early life ==
Mary Blathwayt was born 1 February 1879 in Worthing, Sussex, the daughter of Colonel Linley Blathwayt, an army officer who had served in India, and his wife, Emily, who were first cousins.

Upon retiring from active service, Colonel Blathwayt and his family moved from India to Eagle House, Batheaston, on the outskirts of Bath.

Her younger brother, William, trained as an electrical engineer and taught English in Germany for many years before returning to England at the beginning of the First World War. Mary, remained at home and attended Bath High School.

== Campaigning for women's suffrage ==
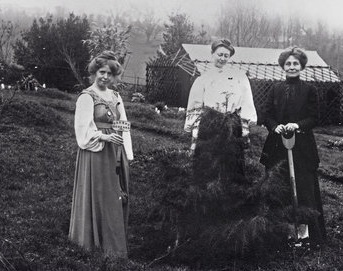
Annie Kenney to the left, Blathwayt at centre and Emmeline Pankhurst, with the spade, at Eagle House in Batheaston in 1910

Blathwayt and her mother started attending meetings of the Bath Women's Suffrage Society. In July 1906, Blathwayt gave three shillings to Women's Social and Political Union (WSPU). She first met Annie Kenney at a WSPU meeting in Bath, which she attended with her friend Aethel Tollemache, and agreed to help Kenney, Elsie Howey, Clara Codd and Mary Phillips organise the women's suffrage campaign in her area.

Mary Blathwayt, 1909

Blathwayt was given an allowance by her family to support her in her work for women's rights. Many women who supported the cause bought merchandise supporting the WSPU such as 'branded' china or brooches, and in Blathwayt's diary she had bought tea (tea leaves) which she had to return to Bath WSPU - as it was "off". Blathwayt met many of the key people from the suffragette movement who were invited to stay at her parental home and to plant a tree to celebrate a prison sentence.

Blathwayt participated in non-militant activism such as the suffragette boycott of the 1911 census. She evaded in a property rented for the night by Mildred Mansel. However, when Vera Wentworth and Elsie Howey assaulted the Prime Minister, this proved too much for Blathwayt's family. Her mother, Emily, resigned from the WSPU and her father, Linley, wrote letters of protest to Christabel Pankhurst, Howey and Wentworth. Pankhurst was told that Howey and Wentworth could not visit their house again. Wentworth sent them a long reply expressing regret at their reaction but noting that "if Mr. Asquith will not receive deputation they will pummel him again".

== Death and legacy ==
Following her retirement from the WSPU, Blathwayt lived a quiet life with her family at Eagle House until her death on 25 June 1961. The sixty trees that were planted at Eagle House were removed to make way for a housing estate. Other trees have been planted to mirror the lost memorials.

Blathwayt's diary reveals that she probably had an affair with Cristabel Pankhurst before Pankhurst moved on to Annie Kenney. Blathwayt made notes of Kenney's sleeping partners when she stayed at Eagle House and jealousy has been proposed as the reason. In 1961 the Local Planning Authority overruled local objections and allowed the gardens to be redeveloped. The house was kept but its contents were auctioned and this included a Boadicea brooch given by Annie Kenney to Blathwayt. The garden did not completely go unnoticed as a local journalist noted that the contents of the house were unimportant when compared to the suffragette's garden.

The national archives has records belonging to a diarist of Batheaston who had a younger brother named William who worked in Germany who knew Margaret Hewitt.

== See also ==
- Women's suffrage in the United Kingdom
