= Irene and Hilda Dallas =

British suffragette sisters

Irene Dallas and Hilda Dallas
- Born: Hilda Mary Dallas born 1878 Irene Dallas born 1883; Hilda Dallas, Japan Irene Dallas, not known
- Died: Hilda Dallas, 1958 Irene Dallas, alive in 1912, death date not known Hilda Dallas, London, England Irene Dallas, not known
- Citizenship: British
- Occupations: Hilda Dallas, Artist and suffragette Irene Dallas, suffragette
- Organisation: Women's Social and Political Union
- Known for: Hilda Dallas – poster artwork for women's suffrage Irene Dallas - protest activism, parades and imprisonment

Irene Dallas (1883–1971) and Hilda Dallas (1878–1958) were British suffragette sisters: Hilda, an artist, designed publicity material, Irene, a protester was imprisoned for political reasons, and both sisters also boycotted the 1911 Census.

== Life ==
Irene Dallas (born 1883) and her elder sister Hilda Mary Dallas (1878–1958) who was an artist, who was born in Japan to an English father who was a Ming dealer, but left them poor when he died, during their 20s. Hilda came to London to study art and the sisters became early members of the Women's Social and Political Union (WSPU), the suffragettes, taking part in activist protest events, leading to prison sentences for Irene. Hilda designed posters for WSPU newspaper Votes for Women and its successor organisation. The sisters both boycotted the 1911 Census, whilst resident at 36 St George's Mansions, Red Lion Square as a protest at being counted by the British government whilst denied the right to vote for it. Later in life Hilda designed stage scenery and costumes, as well as illustrated books, and became a Christian Scientist.

== Suffragette activism ==
Hilda Dallas was seen in a poster parade encouraging women to come to the demonstration at the House of Commons on 30 June 1908 with Dorothy Hartopp Radcliffe, Charlotte Marsh and Dora Spong in the Strand earlier in June 1908. The image is in the Museum of London.

Hilda Dallas (third from left) in poster parade in June 1908

Irene Dallas was studying mathematics whilst already in prison and the prison governor wrote, on 9 October 1908, to the Home Office, for permission for her to be sent an Algebra and Geometry and a Trigonometry book, as she was preparing for the Cambridge University entrance examinations. The governor remarked in his letter that 'A lady who runs the risk of imprisonment has presumably calculated that her action is of more importance to her than her prospects of getting into Cambridge.' However permission was given on the 'usual' understanding that the books would be 'donated to the prison library'.

Hilda Dallas was an artist, involved in the Suffragette Atelier, from 1909, which trained and supported artists to create media in favour of women's suffrage. Hilda Dallas designed a poster for Votes for Women the WSPU publication, and later redesigned a poster featuring Joan of Arc when the paper became The Suffragette. Hilda Dallas trained at the Slade School of Art (1910–11).

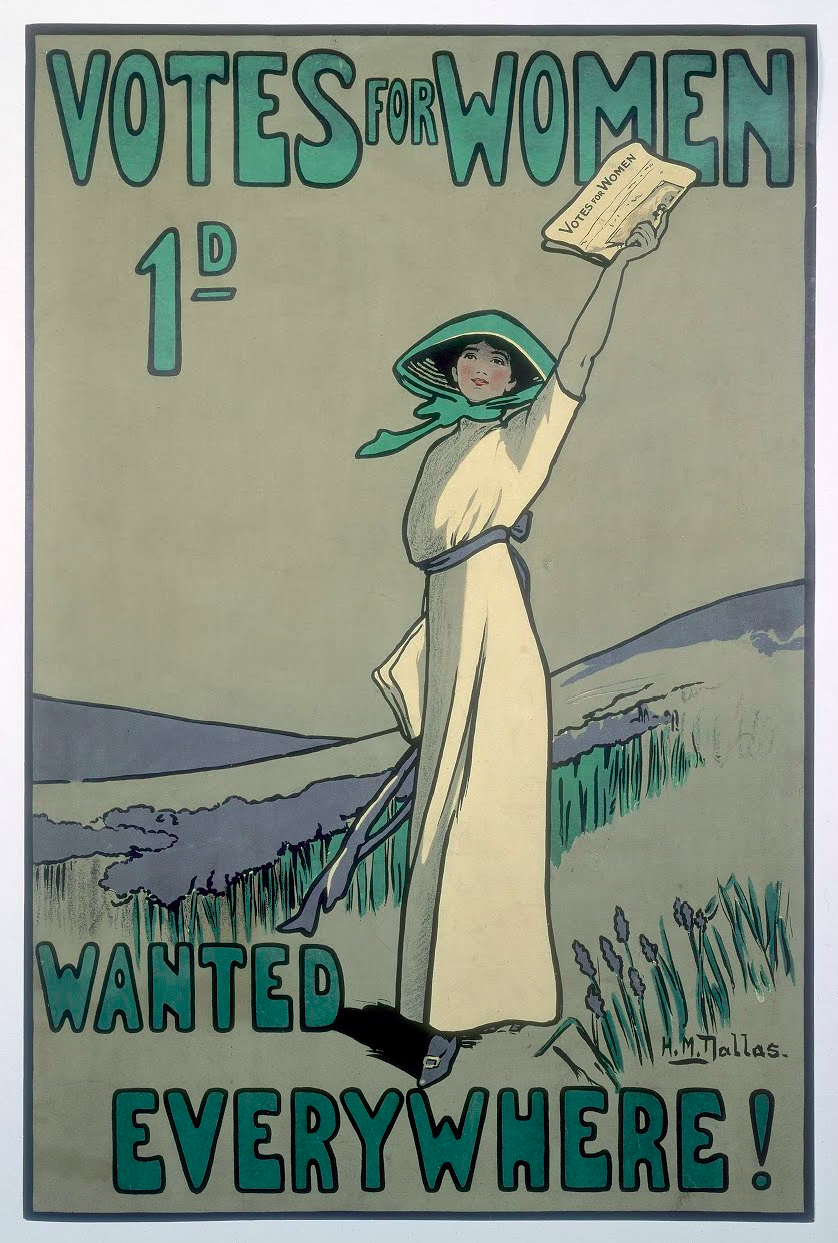
Hilda Dallas's poster for Votes for Women

On 25 January 1909, Irene Dallas went in a taxi with Katherine Douglas Smith and Frances Bartlett to 10 Downing Street, after Lucy Norris and Mary Clarke had been turned away from seeing the Prime Minister, H.H.Asquith. Dallas and the others crossed a triple strength police cordon, asked to see the Prime Minister and, as with the earlier three women, had tried to 'force their way' in, and all were arrested, and imprisoned at Holloway alongside Constance Lytton who had refused to do that particular 'disagreeable job', and felt remorse later.

Miss Dallas was the secretary to the Women's Social and Political Union (WSPU) fife and drum band which performed at a women's suffrage event at the Prince's Ice Rink in May 1909 and in following weeks played outside to 'inspire' hunger-striking suffragettes in Holloway Prison.

Irene Dallas had a role in organising the Women's Social and Political Union (WSPU) protest procession in June 1910, and had colour co-ordinated the banners coming from different unions which can be seen along with the WSPU fife and drum band in films of the procession.

At the 1911 Census, both sisters were marked as 'evaders', when women refused their legal duty to be counted in the population census as they viewed that they were not 'citizens', since being unable to vote. At Christmas 1912, both sisters were with Christabel Pankhurst in Paris. Hilda Dallas died in 1958, Irene Dallas's death is unknown.
