= Hilda Dallas =

British artist and suffragette; pacifist drama producer

- Born: Hilda Mary Dallas; 6 February 1878; Empire of Japan
- Died: 1958 (aged 79–80)
- Education: Slade School of Art
- Occupations: Artist, suffragette organiser, pacifist drama producer
- Organisation: Women's Social and Political Union
- Known for: Posters for Votes for Women newspaper and anti-war drama production
- Movement: Suffrage Atelier
- Relatives: Irene Dallas (sister)

Hilda Mary Dallas (6 February 1878 – 1958) was a British artist and a suffragette who designed suffrage posters and cards and took a leadership role for the Women's Social and Political Union (WSPU). A pacifist, she raised funds from a cross-section of society, produced and designed set & costumes for the 1929 Court Theatre production of the anti-war satirical play The Rumour.

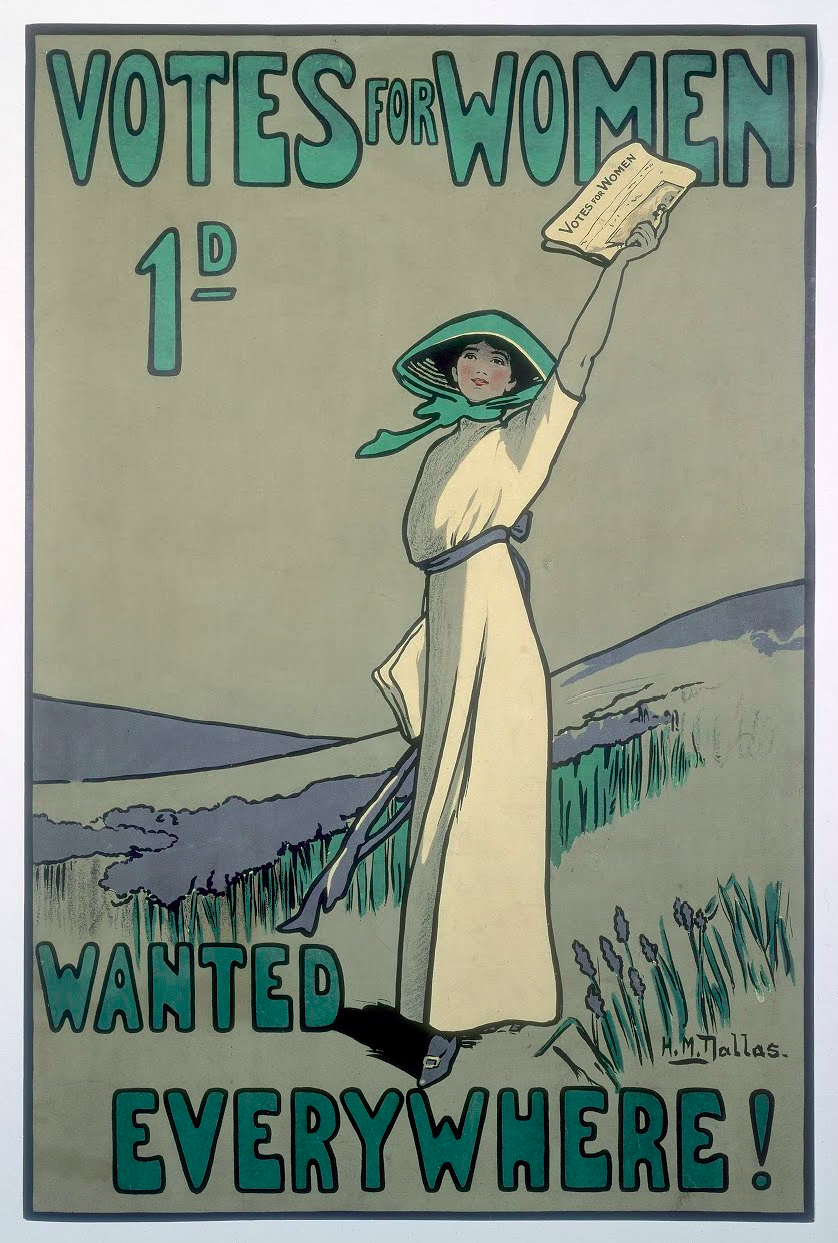
Votes for Women poster, designed by Hilda Dallas 1909

== Early life and education ==
Hilda Mary Dallas was born in what was then the Empire of Japan on 6 February 1878, as her father Charles Dallas was teaching English there. She had a sister Irene born in 1883, and either Hilda or the family returned to Britain before 1901/2, when Hilda Dallas became a student at the Slade School of Fine Art, London. Her works were exhibited with the Allied Artists Association and the Society of Women Artists. Dallas joined the Suffrage Atelier, a group of artists using visual art for supporting the women's suffrage movement.

== Suffragette activism ==
Her sister Irene Dallas was arrested with a WPSU protest group approaching the Prime Minister to ask for action on votes for women. Hilda Dallas was then seen encouraging others to join another Women's Social and Political Union protest on 30 June 1908, in a poster parade outside the House of Commons, with Dorothy Radcliffe, Charlotte Marsh and Dora Spong and selling the W.S.P.U. newspaper Votes for Women.

She financially supported the work of W.S.P.U. fundraising in 1908/9. Dallas became the organiser for WSPU South St. Pancras branch, London. Dallas was seen with a megaphone and suffragettes Mrs May, Maud Joachim, Miss Harriett Ker disrupting the Oxford Cambridge Boat Race.

Hilda Dallas (3rd from Left) in poster parade at House of Commons

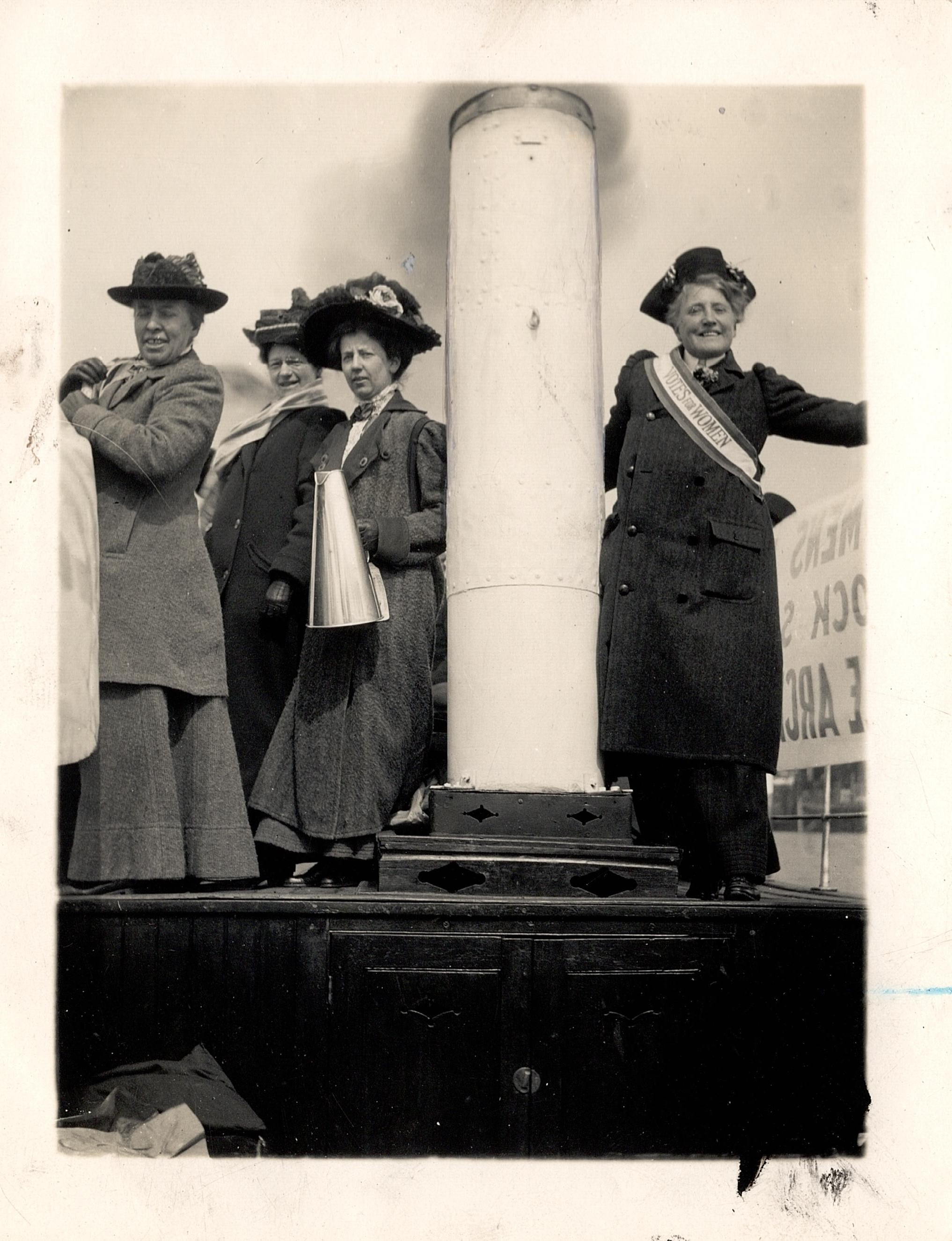
Hilda Dallas (with megaphone) at the Oxford Cambridge Boat Race

In 1909, she designed a new publicity poster of a woman holding high the WSPU newspaper, ‘Votes for Women,’ with the price (one pence 1d) and the words Wanted Everywhere. This had been commissioned after her previous poster (from 1903) with the words 'Read Our Paper', was used for launching street selling of the paper, and was described in it as a 'charming advertisement’; and credited with increasing the sales in Brighton. At the height of the campaign, 40,000 copies were selling (weekly) across the country.

A century after (some) women were enfranchised, the 1903 image was used on the cover of a book by Elizabeth Crawford (2018) on Art and Suffrage: A Biographical Dictionary of Suffrage Artists. The 1908 design was described in 2018 as 'an optimistic vision of equality' in the last century of graphic design by women.

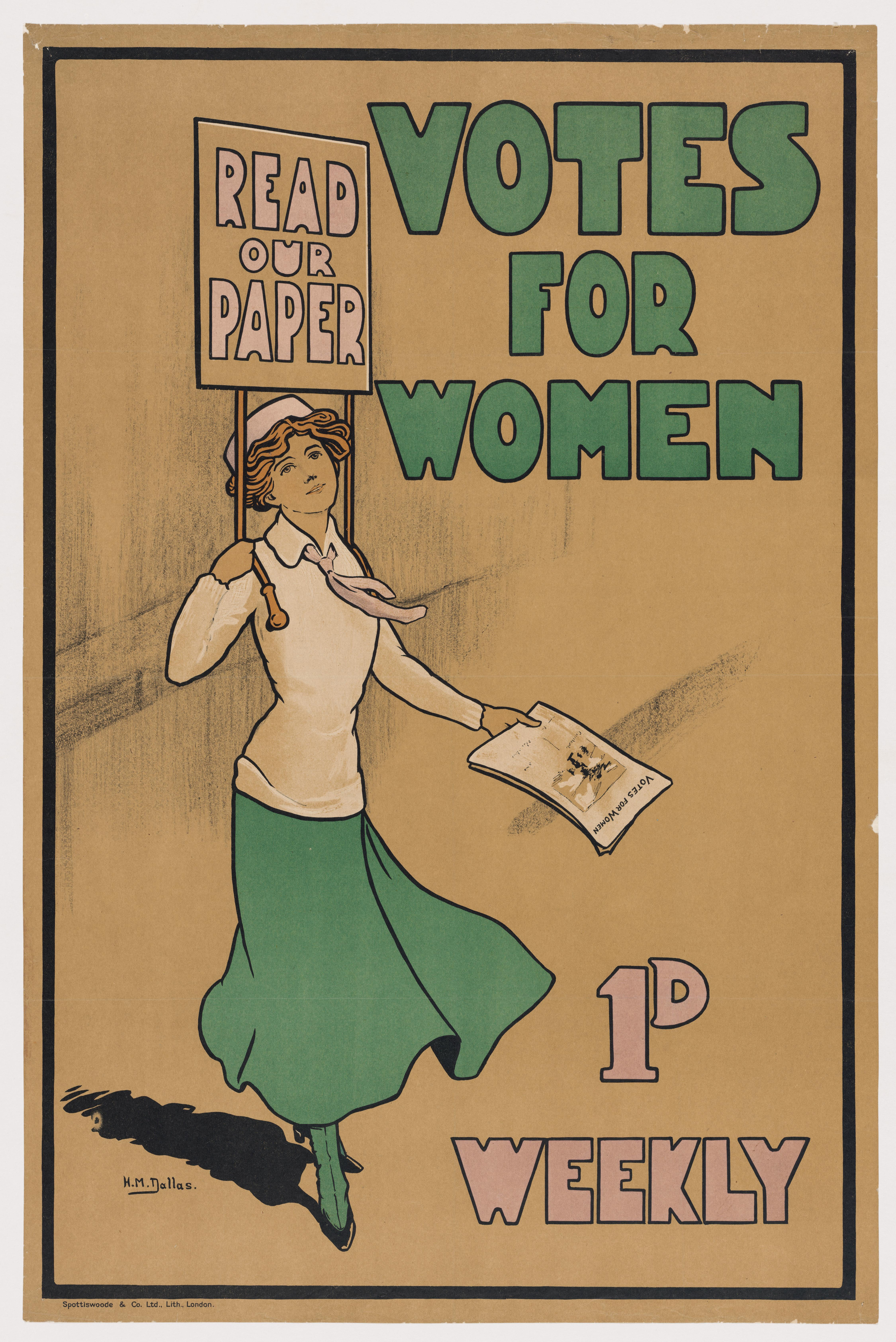
Hilda Dallas's first poster for Votes for Women ca. 1903

The wording 'Wanted Everywhere' poster was used for the self-acclaimed ‘greatest political weekly of the moment’ for the WSPU summer holiday initiative of 1912. The slogan can mean the newspaper is 'wanted' or that women's right to vote is desired (or desirable) in ‘every corner of the British Isles’. The new design was expected by the campaign organisers to be welcomed by holiday cottage tenants or newsagents to show support for the cause and put on display. Bulk discount was offered. One activist, Miss Harman reported it was already on display at Woodbridge railway station shop when she went to distribute the papers.

Like the posters, Dallas's 1909 Christmas card graphic designs were in the WSPU colours (green, white and purple), and (with two other cards) were expected to raise £100 at the WPSU shops that Christmas (priced at 3d; this would require sales of 8000 cards). The shops had seasonal window displays of WSPU gifts, cards and literature. The Kilburn High Road shop had a doll dressed as per Hilda Dallas's poster, carrying a copy of the poster on its shoulders. It attracted in a young girl, offering up 2 pence to see the ‘suffragettes’, to be told that looking is 'free of charge'.

By January 1910, Dallas was again taking up a more direct role in the suffrage campaign, organising the General Election W.S.P.U. offices in Newman Street, Westminster, from where ‘hit squads’ of suffragettes were posted to different constituencies, and asked to hire premises and to co-ordinate the local ‘Keep the Liberal Out’ campaign, a position taken by WSPU as the Liberal government had failed to enfranchise women.

In the 1911 Census, neither Hilda Dallas nor her sister Irene, were recorded at their home in 35 St. George's Mansions, Red Lion Square nor at any other address, so were amongst the census resisters (who argued that if women were not considered as 'citizens' to vote, they should not be counted in the population census). For Christmas 1911, a design by Dallas for a WSPU Christmas card has a purple Father Christmas holding a Votes for Women postcard.

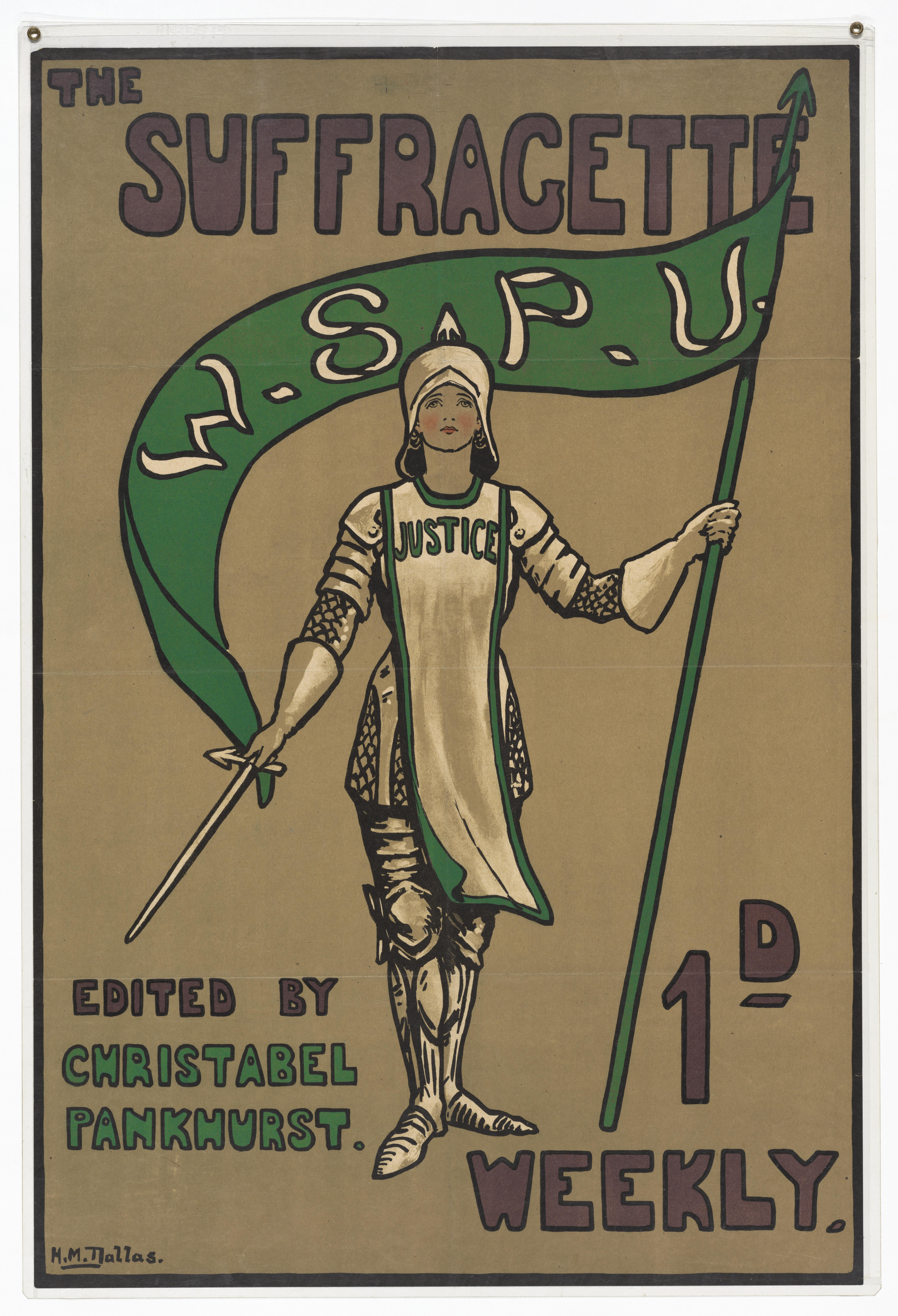
The Suffragette poster, with Joan of Arc like figure, design by Hilda Dallas

In 1912, after a split in the WSPU's leadership, The Suffragette became their weekly publication, and a poster image was designed by Dallas including a Joan of Arc like figure with the word 'Justice' on her tabard, wearing armour and holding a sword and a WSPU pennant. The saint was used as an iconic image in the women's suffrage campaigns - a 'militant woman's ideal'. The design was also made into a silver enamel brooch. This poster is on display at the Victoria and Albert Museum, London.

On Christmas Day 1913, Hilda Dallas went with her sister Irene, and eleven other suffrage activist as guests to Paris to dine with Christabel Pankhurst, in the fashionable Restaurant Mollard, designed by Édouard Niermans, and they ended by singing The March of the Women.

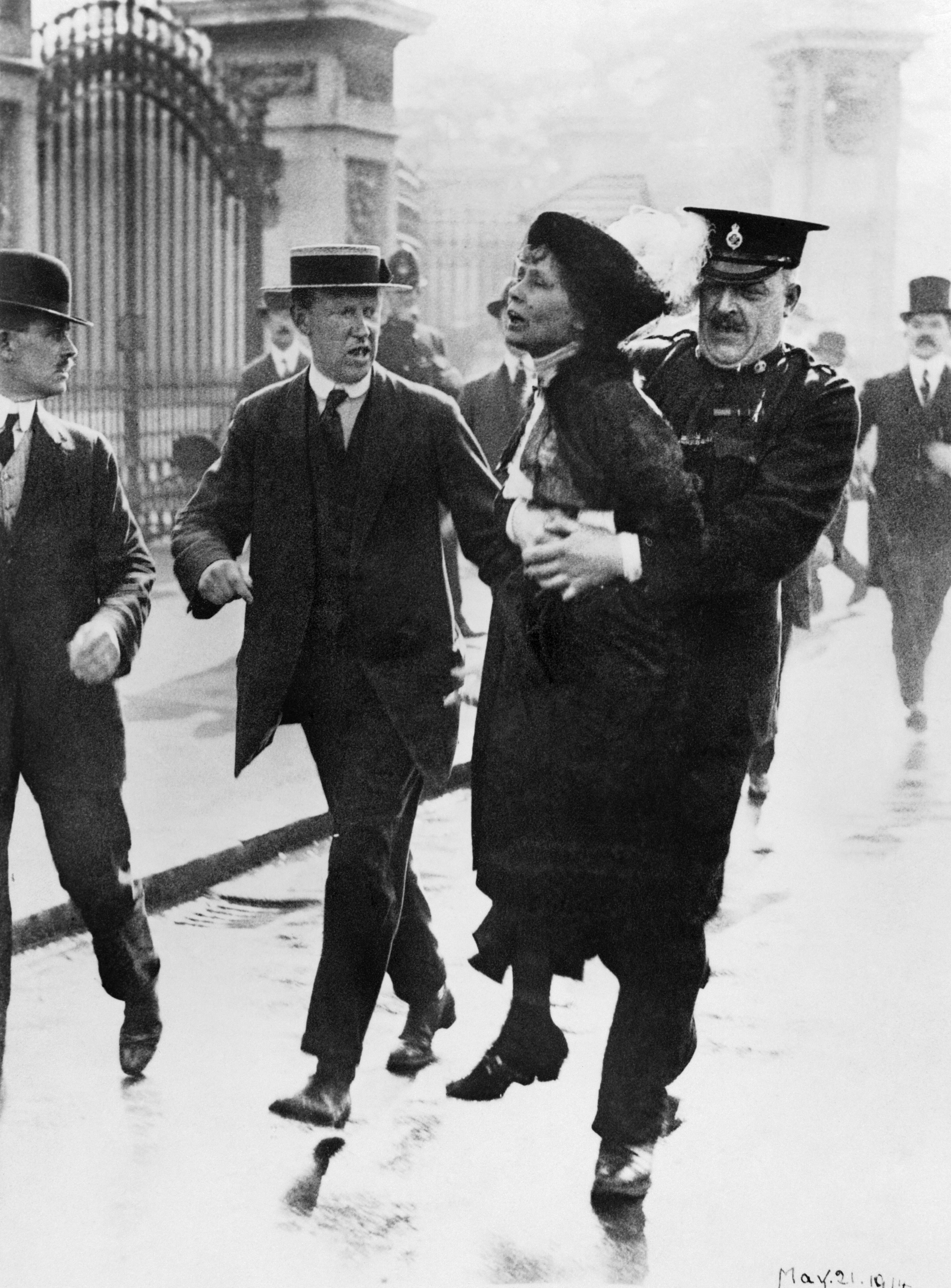
Emmeline Pankhurst being arrested at Buckingham Palace Gates

Dallas's drawing ‘To Buckingham Palace’ in WSPU colours (on sale by antique book dealer) was a drawing of the deputation of suffragettes to Buckingham Palace on 21 May 1914. The image was used on a flyer to attract support ‘to demand votes for women, to protest against torture, to claim equal treatment for militant Ulster men and militant suffragists.‘ WPSU was asking attendees to ensure there was no police violence against the women demanding access to the Palace (despite the formal denial of an audience with King George V). The aim was to ensure enough attendance to prevent a repeat of Black Friday when WSPU leader Mrs Pankhurst was manhandled, and many women injured. Despite this appeal, the protest also had Mrs Pankhurst being physically carried from the scene by police. Mrs Pankhurst called off WSPU militancy in support of the war effort and for an amnesty of prisoners.

During World War One Dallas became a pacifist.

Dallas and her sister Irene, joined the Christian Scientists, and were registered as such at 77 Edith Road, Barons Court, London on 29 September 1939 at the start of World War Two. The sisters lived together until Hilda Dallas's death in 1958.

== Sponsor of anti-war drama production ==
Dallas became the prime mover in raising funds of £5,000 for a production of C.K.Munro's anti-war play ‘The Rumour’ to be performed in 1929 at the Court Theatre. Production, design and costumes were by Dallas and the reviewers told of her drive and commitment, and the strength of the pacifist message through Munro's satirical drama:

=== Reviews ===
- The Woman's Leader called it ‘A Peace Play’ that was ‘extremely clever and interesting’.
- A reviewer in The Woman Teacher recommended the play to all who seek ‘world peace’ and called it ‘thrilling and absorbing from beginning to end.’
- The Sketch described Dallas as having the ‘spirit of a crusader’ working ‘devotedly and unselfishly’ to put the play on, and called it ‘one of the most powerful anti-war agents that has ever been created’ and ‘that it should be played to all of the world to imbue the masses with the awful truth that wars are rooted in financial interests, distortion and…..waving of flags’.
- The story of Dallas's involvement made a front page column of the London Daily Herald on 1 March 1929 in an article titled ‘Romance of Peace Play’; on a day when the news lead was headed ‘Startling New “War Plan” Disclosure’.
  - The report said she had set up a production company to bring ‘The Rumour’ to the London stage, after a social meeting with a colonel from the Great War who predicted another major conflict 'in about 10 year's time... with all our young men... as.. ‘cannon fodder' unless something was done to educate the public - and he had asked her directly ‘What are you women going to do about it?’
  - Dallas was said to have reckoned this play would have an impact, as she had seen it when her cousin, Allan Wade had produced it for Stage Society in 1922 and he had agreed to help. The article told of her fundraising from small donations of half-a-crown (one eighth of a £), to working women giving her a week's wages (£3), and other people donating up to £350, to reach the needed £4,500 (later £5,000). Dallas was also said to have invited all the Members of Parliament to see the play.
  - The Daily Herald reviewer had called it ‘The Play That All Should See’ - ‘A Satire on Big Money's Ways of Starting Wars’ and praised the production and design.
- The Sunday Despatch told of how due to financial issues, the run was threatened to end, but was extended due to Dallas obtaining private donations (totalling £400) from three women who had lost sons in the Great War, and from a colonel wounded at Flanders; Dallas was quoted as saying that these donors had thought that this play ‘teaches a lesson of national importance’.
- This production and Dallas's fundraising had made news in New Zealand.
- The Vote reported ‘unanimous’ critical acclaim, and noted that Dallas's set designs were ‘warmly praised for their simplicity and brilliant effect’.
- The Woman Teacher called the design ‘beautiful’ and well arranged for ‘numerous short scenes follow swiftly’.
- 'The Rumour' was still considered a pertinent anti-war piece by a World War One drama blog reviewer in 2016.

An image of part of Dallas's set design and costumes are in the Victoria and Albert Museum

== Denton Welch ==
Hilda Dallas and her sister had known the author and artist Denton Welch since he was a child, and they remained close throughout Welch's short life. Hilda Dallas appears (as 'Clare') in Welch's unfinished, posthumously-published autobiographical novel A Voice Through a Cloud (1952).

== See also ==
- Irene and Hilda Dallas
- Suffrage Atelier
- Women's Social and Political Union
- Anti-war plays

== External images ==
- Votes for Women Read Our Paper 1903 Schlesinger Library poster
- Votes for Women Wanted Everywhere 1909 Museum of London poster
- A Merry Christmas, 1911 Museum of London card
- The Suffragette 1912 Victoria and Albert Museum poster and brooch (private collection)
- To Buckingham Palace 1914 in Pickering and Chatto sales catalogue (item 69)
- C.K.Munro 'The Rumour' The Royal Court Theatre 1929 image of programme (private collection) and Victoria and Albert Museum set design and costume
