= Isabel Seymour =

English suffragette (1882–1963)

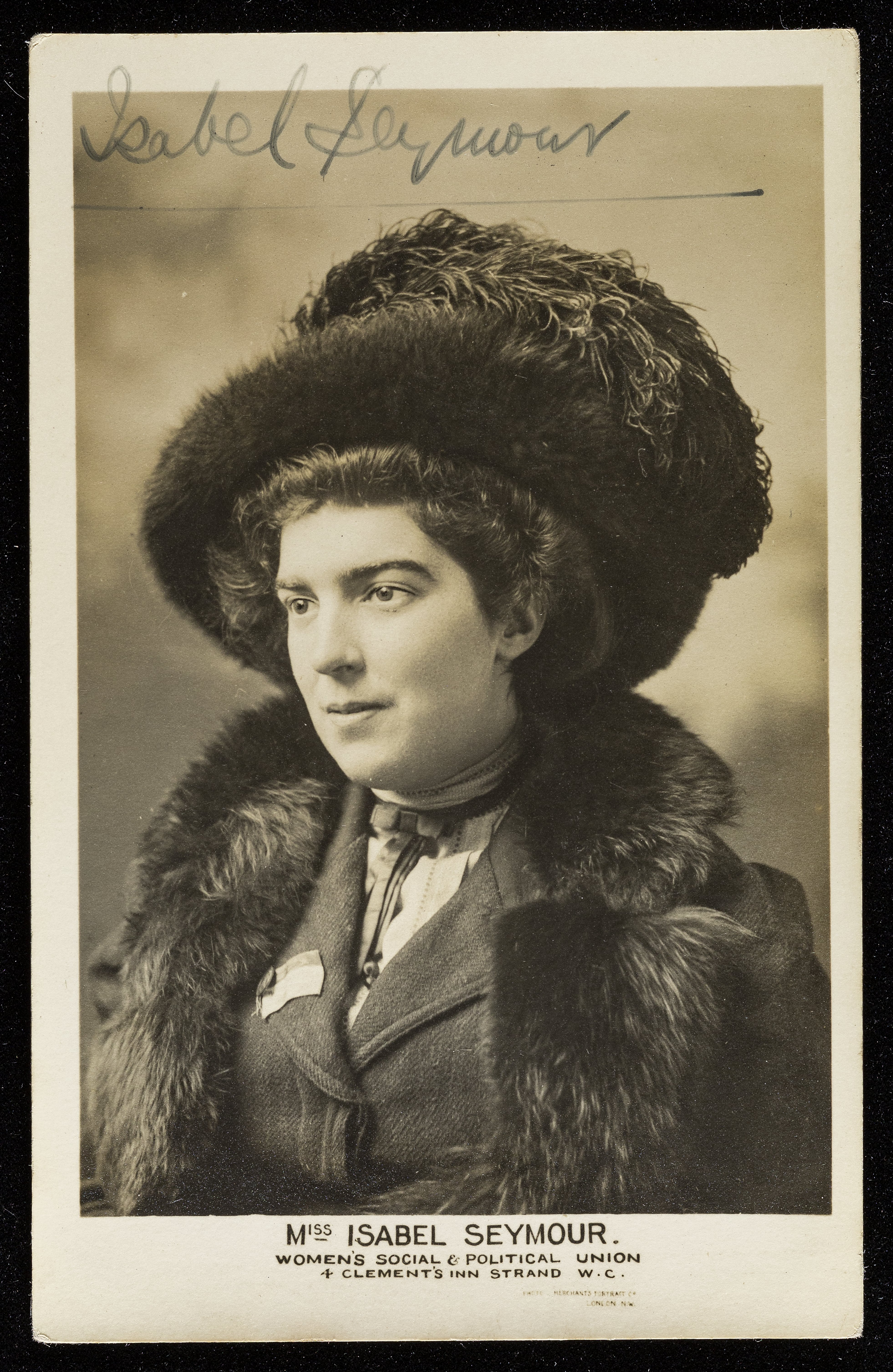
- Born: 1882; Middlesex, England
- Died: 1963 (aged 80–81); Brownshill, Stroud, Gloucestershire, England
- Employer: Women's Social and Political Union
- Parent(s): Charles Read Seymour and Marion Frances Violet Seymour (nee Luxford

Isabel Marion Seymour (1882–1963) was an English suffragette who was employed by the Women's Social and Political Union (WSPU). She undertook speaking tours in Europe. She later became a local councillor in Hampshire.

== Life ==
Seymour was born in 1882 in Middlesex in England. Her parents were Charles and Marion Seymour.

Seymour was introduced to the Women's Social and Political Union by her close friends Frederick Pethick Lawrence and Emmeline Pethick Lawrence. She was employed by the WSPU as hospitality secretary in September 1906. She was involved in administering the accommodation and bail that was required by WSPU members, based at their London headquarters. This was a role she handed over to Irene Dallas in order to be able to travel to speak in Europe in support of women's enfranchisement.

Seymour was a fluent and confident speaker in English and German and she spoke at a meeting of the Prussian National Association for Women's Suffrage in Germany on the on behalf of the WSPU. She also completed a speaking tour in Austria in Russia in 1910.

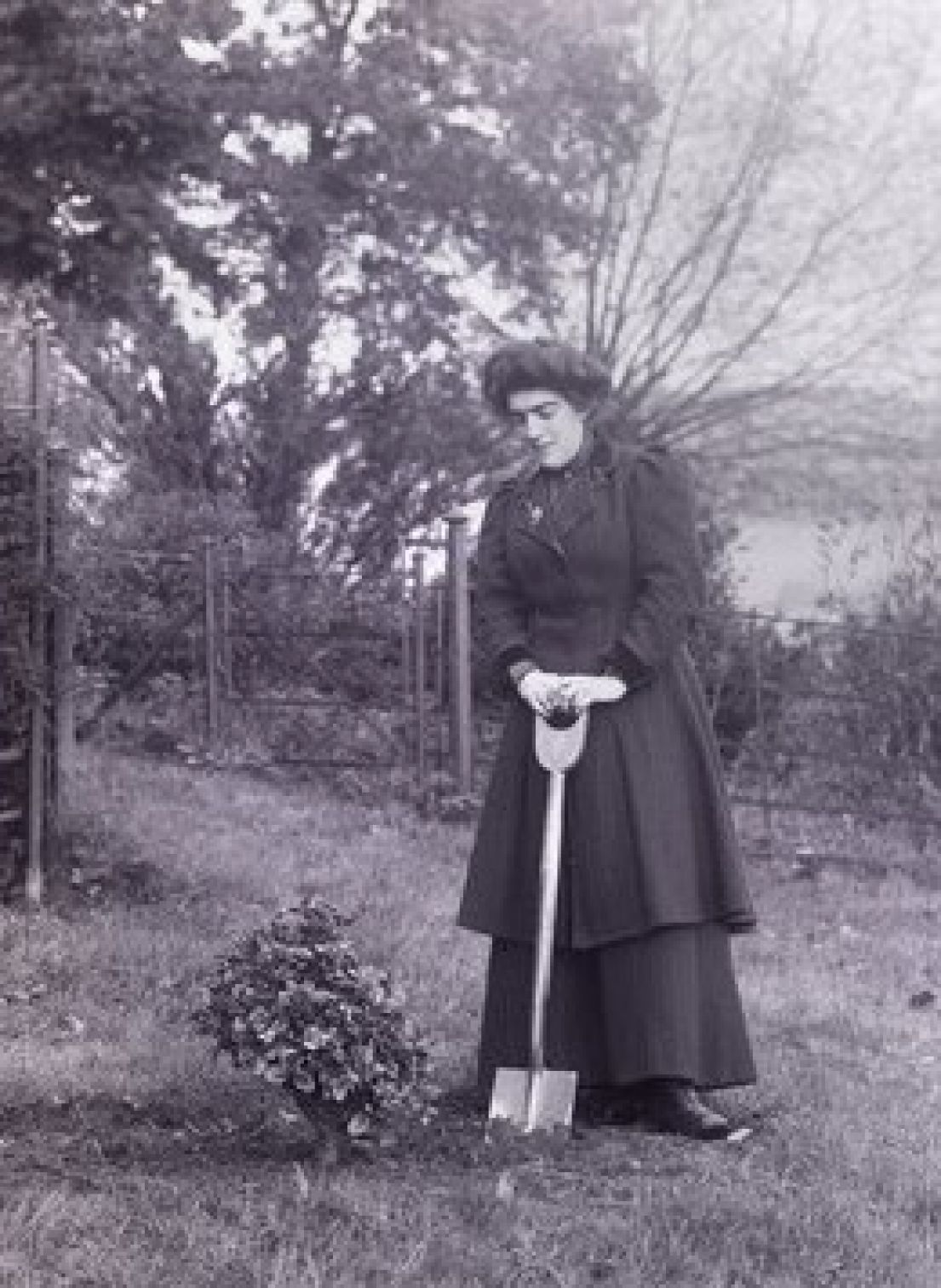
Suffragette Isabel Seymour at Eagle House

In 1909, she was honoured with an invitation to Eagle House in Somerset. This was the home of Colonel Linley Blathwayt and Emily Blathwayt. They supported their daughter Mary Blathwayt and the other WSPU members by providing accommodation for recovering suffragettes. In addition Emily had constructed an arboretum of trees where each new tree was planted by a suffragette. The Blathwayts would also create a plaque and photographs would be taken to record the planting. Seymour planted a holly bush on 24 October 1909.

Seymour later moved to Canada for eight years but she returned to the UK. She became a county councillor for Hampshire. She died in 1963.
