= Irene Dallas =

British suffragette activist

- Born: Irene Margaret Dallas; 12 April 1883; Yokohama, Japan
- Died: 19 October 1971; Bournemouth, Dorset, England
- Known for: Suffragette activist and campaigner

Irene Margaret Dallas (1883–1971) was a suffragette activist, speaker and organiser who held leadership roles in the WSPU; she was arrested and imprisoned with a group who tried to gain access to 10 Downing Street.

== Life and activism ==
Irene Margaret Dallas was born on 12 April 1883 in Yokohama, Japan, and had a sister Hilda (born 1878).

In July 1908, Dallas donated sixteen shillings (eighty pence) for the £20,000 Fund (WSPU) recorded as “Miss Irene Dallas (Hyde Park Banner)”.

In September 1908, Dallas regularly spoke to factory girls at meetings in Portland Square, Bristol; some also went to her meetings on the Downs, despite this being some distance from their dwellings. Being unable to afford badges, they wore home-made sashes in suffragette colours on which they had pencilled “votes for women”.

The following week, it is reported that Dallas ‘won the hearts and converted the heads’ of the factory girls; her meetings took place in Portland Square again and at the Wills Tobacco factory, which had more than a thousand workers.

Dallas made another contribution to the £20,000 Fund in October 1908 (10 shillings) .

=== Imprisonment and release ===
Dallas was one of a group of suffragettes who tried to gain access to 10 Downing Street in January 1909. Along with Catherine Douglas Smith and Frances Satterley (Mrs Frances Clara Bartlett), she was arrested and taken to Bow Street Court, then remanded until the following Monday. In its account of the same incident, “The Globe" newspaper notes that Dallas was a teacher. In court, Dallas was offered the chance to pay a £10 surety, but opted to go to Holloway Jail for one month instead. An article in “Votes for Women” headed “Victory through prison” started with quotes from four of the women involved. Dallas was reported as saying: ‘The cause needs militant women, and needs them now. We will give them as warm a welcome in Holloway as the authorities allow.’

“The Globe” newspaper gave a lengthy account of their release and welcome by other campaigners in its 27 February edition. The women were welcomed at the prison gates by Miss Christabel Pankhurst, Mrs Drummond and Mr Pethick Lawrence. They were taken to the Inns of Court Hotel in brakes decorated in suffragette colours; the second brake even had a band. At the breakfast itself, Christabel Pankhurst talked about the 'Silence rule’ which was imposed on women in the prison yard, and the attempts that would be made to abolish it. Miss Pankhurst also described Dallas and the other women as ‘her favourites' . Dallas' name is on the Roll of Honour of Suffragettes.

Despite being newly released, both Dallas and Miss Douglas Smith affirmed their intention of involving themselves in forthcoming by-elections.

=== Other roles in WSPU ===
Dallas’ membership of the “YHB” is noted in the 5 March edition of “Votes for Women”. The initials stood for “Young Hot Bloods”, and it was made up of a secretive group of younger WSPU members, willing to take risks, who included Grace Roe, Jessie Kenney, Elsie Howey, Vera Wentworth and Mary Home. In the same month, Dallas was given special responsibilities for “Votes for Women Week”.

For the release from prison of Mrs Pethick Lawrence in April 1909, a major demonstration was planned by the WSPU. Dallas, along with Miss Ainsworth, was put in charge of the teachers’ contingent - it was noted that since the event would be taking place during school holidays, a large number were expected to participate. During April, Dallas spoke at a number of outdoor events e.g. at Hyde Park, at Paddington (twice on the same day), and in Putney (both indoors and outdoors).

Through the columns of the WSPU newspaper, volunteers for the WSPU Drum and Fife Band were asked to contact Dallas, who was Band Secretary and operating out of 4 Clements Inn, the organisation's headquarters. It was noted that volunteers who could play during the day were especially welcome. This band was known as far afield as India; the West Riding Regiment’s drummers wrote to the band offering to exchange a photograph of their band with one of the WSPU. The same edition of “Votes for Women” noted that the band had played in Manchester and in Liverpool.

In succession to Isabel Seymour, Dallas was also appointed Hospitality Secretary of the WSPU in June 1909; in Seymour’s resignation letter, she appealed for more London hostesses for country members coming to the capital for events or deputations; thus clarifying one of the responsibilities which Dallas would then shoulder. Later in the year, Dallas was given other WSPU leadership roles: in September she replaced Miss Cameron in charge of the ‘Speakers’ department’; all those requesting speakers for any part of London had to contact her in the first instance.

Dallas was also one of four women sent from London to help in the Derbyshire by-election in July; the others are named as Miss Hewett, Miss Wylie and Barbara Ayrton. During the campaign, Dallas spoke several times in Buxton. Her responsibilities were increased again in October, when she was put in charge of the WSPU's organisation for the Bermondsey by-election; her headquarters were on Tower Bridge Road. The “Votes for Women” article, announcing Dallas's appointment, noted that the reason for the campaign was that the success of a Liberal candidate would increase the Liberal majority - something WSPU opposed - as the Liberals in government were responsible for refusing enfranchisement and imposing prison and thus suffragette hunger strikers being force fed. On Polling Day, she arranged for women campaigners to be present at Polling Stations throughout the day in relays; according to “Votes for Women”, the campaigners were greeted positively by people coming to vote.; and the result of the election was that the Conservatives won the seat.

In December, the Mary Leigh Defence Fund received £1 from Dallas. The fund was to finance a legal case which Leigh was bringing against the Governor of Winson Green Jail (Birmingham), its prison doctor and the Home Secretary

=== Organising events ===
Another responsibility was given to Dallas in 1910, when she was appointed Banner Secretary ahead of the planned two-mile long procession to be held at the end of May. In the list of appointments, Dallas is second only in the overall management to Olive Smith (Procession Secretary). There were other organisational roles for different occupations whose contingents were to take part – e.g., Dr. Garrett Anderson for 'Professional women’, ‘Teachers’ by Miss Cameron, ‘Young ladies in business houses’ by Miss Fargus and Miss Vibert. Dallas was also made the contact for former suffragette prisoners, who were to march in honour at the head of the procession.

However, the planned procession was actually postponed due to the death of King Edward VII .

In its report of the 18 June procession,“The Globe” listed Dallas as ‘Chief Banner Marshal’ along with ‘General on horseback Mrs Drummond’ and ‘Chief Marshal Miss Jessie Kenney’ and also notes that there were forty bands and seven sections in the procession. 'The Referee' newspaper the following day adds that there were seven hundred banners and a thousand police. The "Sheffield Daily Telegraph” of Monday 20 June gives a long account of the event; noting that Dallas was only five yards behind the leader of the procession Mrs Drummond. Dallas's demeanour is described: ’ a handsome fair haired girl stepped like a drum major as she carried high the first banner of the WSPU’

Irene Dallas is next reported on in 1912, when she is in Paris at a Christmas dinner at the Restaurant Mollard (designed by Édouard Niermans), with 'exiled' Christabel Pankhurst, and fellow guests Jessie Murray Clark, Blanche Edwards, Dorothy Hapgood and Irene's sister Hilda; and according to The Suffragette, the evening ended with the singing of “The March of the Women.”

Dallas had a long life, dying in 1971 in Bournemouth; she left over £13,000.

== See also ==
- Irene and Hilda Dallas
