= Red Lion Square =

Square in Holborn, London

Coordinates: 51°31′9″N 0°7′8″W

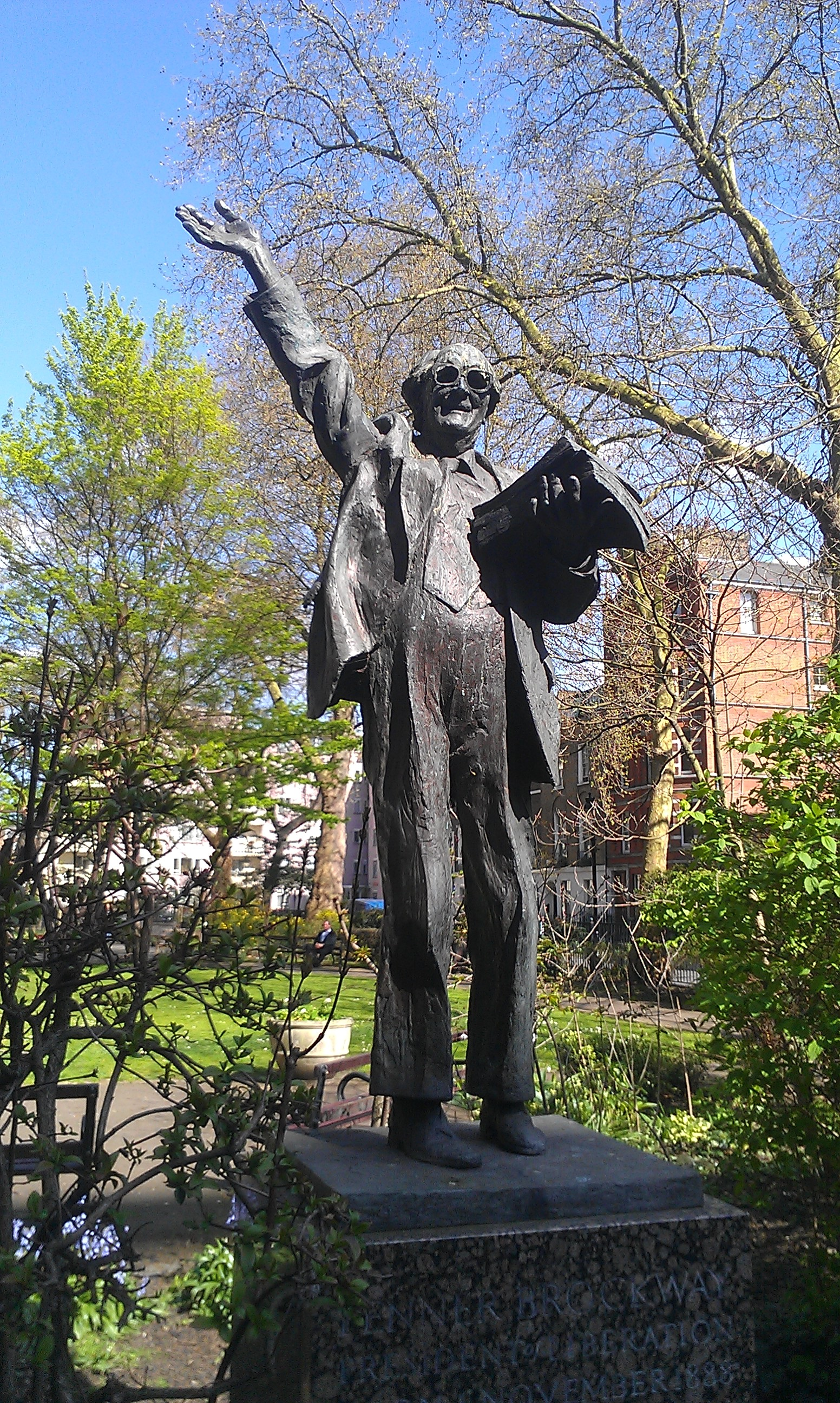
Statue of Fenner Brockway at the west entrance of Red Lion Square

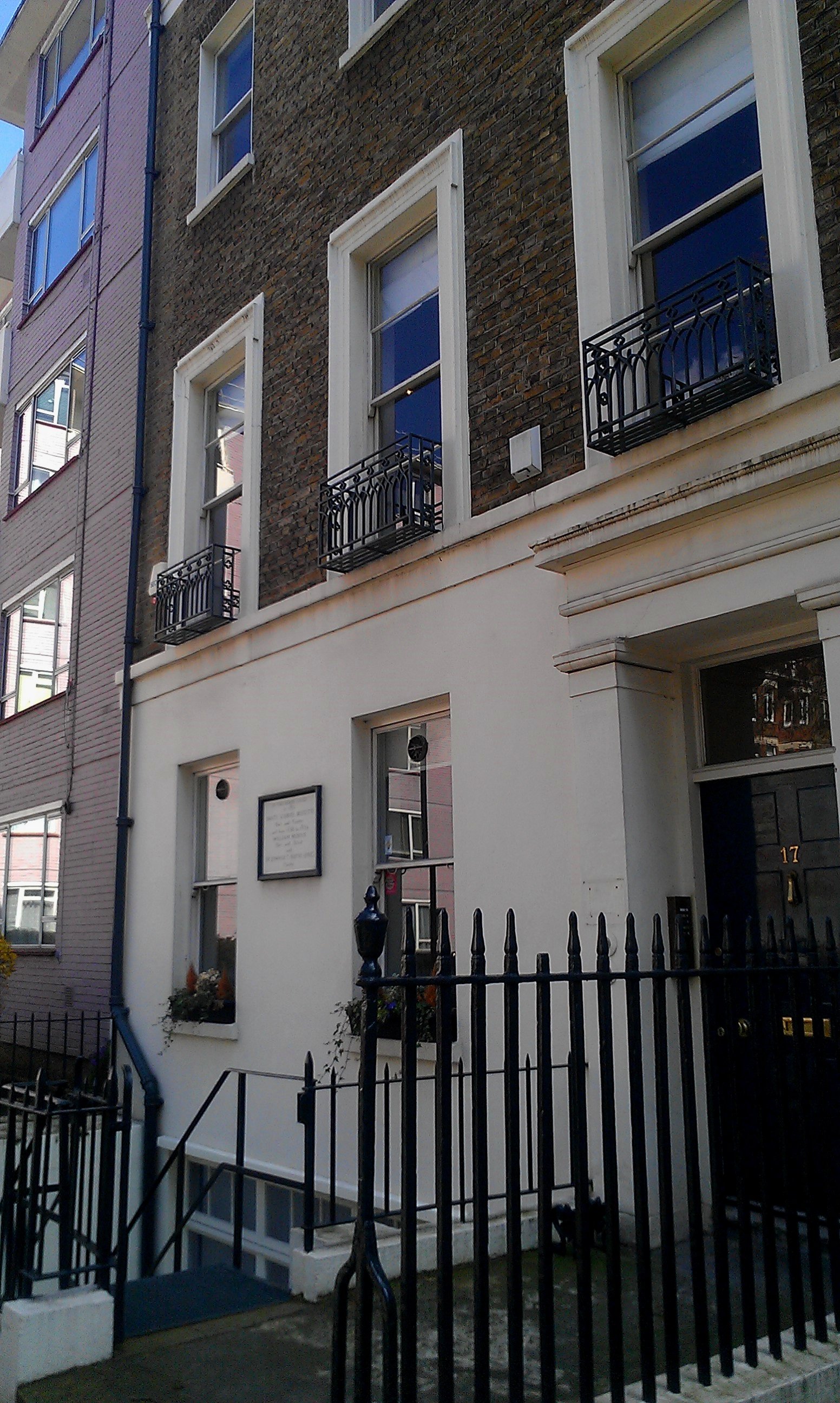
Flat on the southern side of the square in which William Morris and Edward Burne-Jones lived in the 1850s

Red Lion Square is a small square in Holborn, London. The square was laid out in 1684 by Nicholas Barbon, taking its name from the Red Lion Inn. According to some sources, the bodies of three regicides—Oliver Cromwell, John Bradshaw and Henry Ireton—were placed in a pit on the site of the square.

By 1720, it was a fashionable part of London: the eminent judge Sir Bernard Hale was a resident of Red Lion Square. The square was "beautified" pursuant to a 1737 Act of Parliament. In the 1860s, on the other hand, it had clearly become decidedly unfashionable: the writer Anthony Trollope in his novel Orley Farm (1862) humorously reassures his readers that one of his characters is perfectly respectable, despite living in Red Lion Square. The Metropolitan Public Gardens Association's landscape gardener Fanny Wilkinson laid it out as a public garden in 1885, and, in 1894, the trustees of the square passed the freehold to the MPGA, which, in turn, passed it to the London County Council free of cost.

== Past residents ==
A notable resident of the square was John Harrison, the world-renowned inventor of the marine chronometer, who lived at number 12, where he died in 1776. There is a blue plaque dedicated to him on the corner of Summit House.

At No. 3, in 1826, Charles Lamb was painted by Henry Mayer. At No 17, Dante Gabriel Rossetti lived in 1851. Also at No 17, William Morris, Edward Burne-Jones and Richard Watson Dixon lived from 1856 to 1859. No. 8 was a decorators shop run by Morris, Burne-Jones and others from 1860 to 1865. No. 31 was the home of F. D. Maurice.

At 35 St. George's Mansions in the square, suffragette sisters Irene and Hilda Dallas had lived and had evaded the 1911 census in protest that women did not have a right to vote.

== Modern state ==
The centre-piece of the garden today is a statue by Ian Walters of Fenner Brockway, which was installed in 1986. There is also a memorial bust of Bertrand Russell. Conway Hall opens on to the square.

The square today is home to the Royal College of Anaesthetists. Lamb's Conduit Street is nearby and the nearest underground station is Holborn.

The Faculty of Medical Leadership and Management moved to Red Lion Square in 2019.

The first headquarters of Marshall, Faulkner & Co, which was founded by William Morris, was at 8 Red Lion Square.

At No 4 Parton Street, a cul-de-sac off the square subsequently obliterated by St Martin's College of Art in Southampton Row (later Central Saint Martins), a group of young writers, including Dylan Thomas, George Barker, David Gascoyne and John Pudney, gathered about the bookshop run by David Archer.

== Protest ==
On 15 June 1974 a meeting by the National Front in Conway Hall resulted in a protest by anti-fascist groups. The following disorder and police action left one student—Kevin Gately from the University of Warwick—dead.
