= Alfred Pearse =

English artist, author, campaigner and inventor

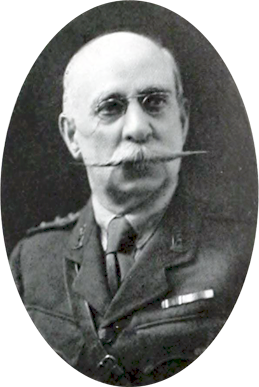
- Alfred Pearse, Captain, NZRB, 1918–19; Photo: Elliott & Fry
- Born: Alfred Pearse; 20 May 1855; St Pancras, London, England
- Died: 1933 (aged 77–78); London, England
- Education: West London School of Art
- Known for: Painting and illustration
- Notable work: Spirit of War, 1914; The Angel of Mons, 1915; Saint George, 1915
- Spouse: Mary Blanche Lockwood
- Children: 6

Alfred Pearse (20 May 1855 – 1933), also known as A Patriot, was an English artist, author, campaigner and inventor.

== Early life and education ==
Alfred Pearse was born 20 May 1855 at St Pancras, London. He was a fourth generation artist and son of celebrated decorative artist Joseph Salter Pearse (1822–1896) and Loveday Colbron (1825–1895). He studied at West London School of Art and gained numerous prizes for drawing.

== Career ==
As special artist and correspondent to The Sphere, he was assigned to the Duke and Duchess of Cornwall and York's 1901 tour of New Zealand.

Pearse designed posters campaigning for women's suffrage. He drew a weekly cartoon for Votes for Women from 1909, and was also regularly published in The Illustrated London News, Boy's Own Paper and Punch. With Laurence Housman and his sister Clemence Housman, he set up the Suffrage Atelier.

Pearse produced various artworks, cartoons and propaganda related to British efforts in World War I. From 11 September 1918 to March 1919, he held an honorary captain's commission in the New Zealand Rifle Brigade, NZEF, as official artist, painting the battle scenes in which the 1st NZRB figured. He was attached to Brigadier General Charles Melvill's headquarters and left London for France on 27 September 1918.

He was a wood engraver, book illustrator and art critic, including for the Manchester Guardian, and for eight years had been a member of Joseph Barnby's Royal Choral Society.

Amongst his inventions, he'd patented improvements to vehicle and cycle wheels, improvements relating to the frames of velocipedes, a method for animating advertising hoardings in 1908–1912, improvements in flying machines, devised a model air-ship for the October 1905 readers of The Boy's Own Paper and a method of preserving shores.

His son Denis Colbron Pearse (1883–1971) also was an illustrator.

== Gallery ==
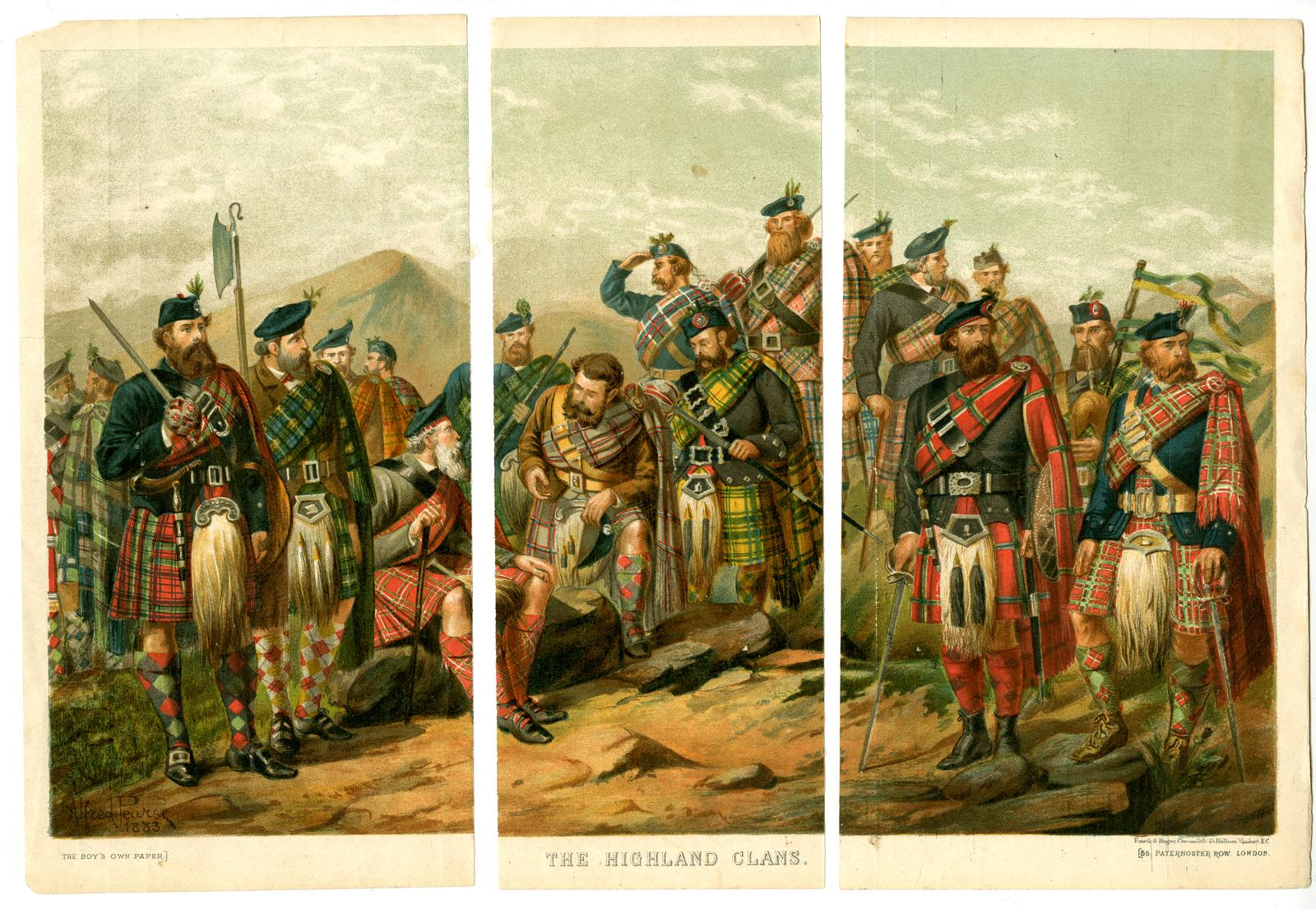
The Highland Clans, The Boy's Own Paper, 1883

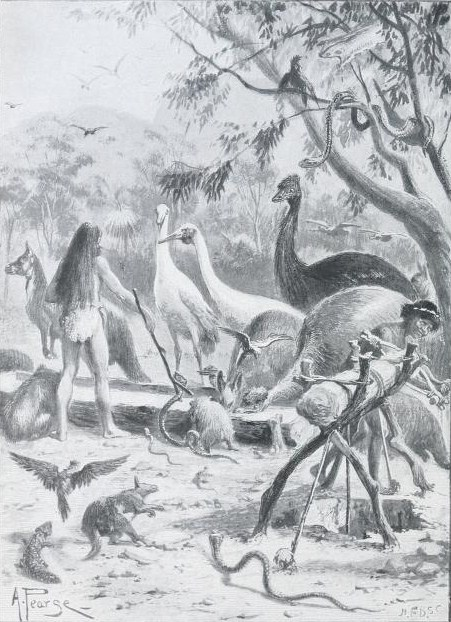
Illustration from The Adventures of Louis de Rougemont, 1899

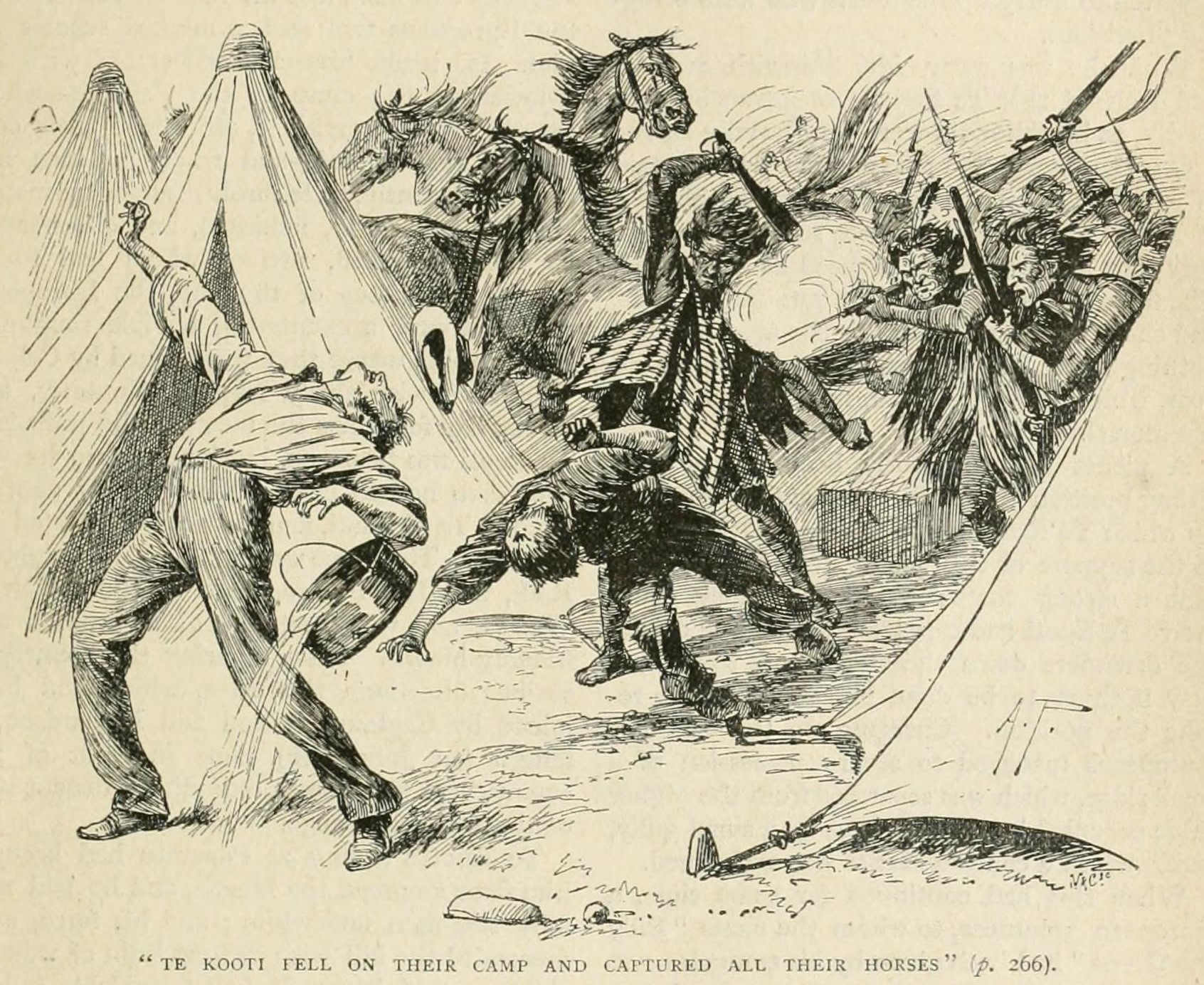
Fight at Paparatu in 1865 during Te Kooti's War, 1901

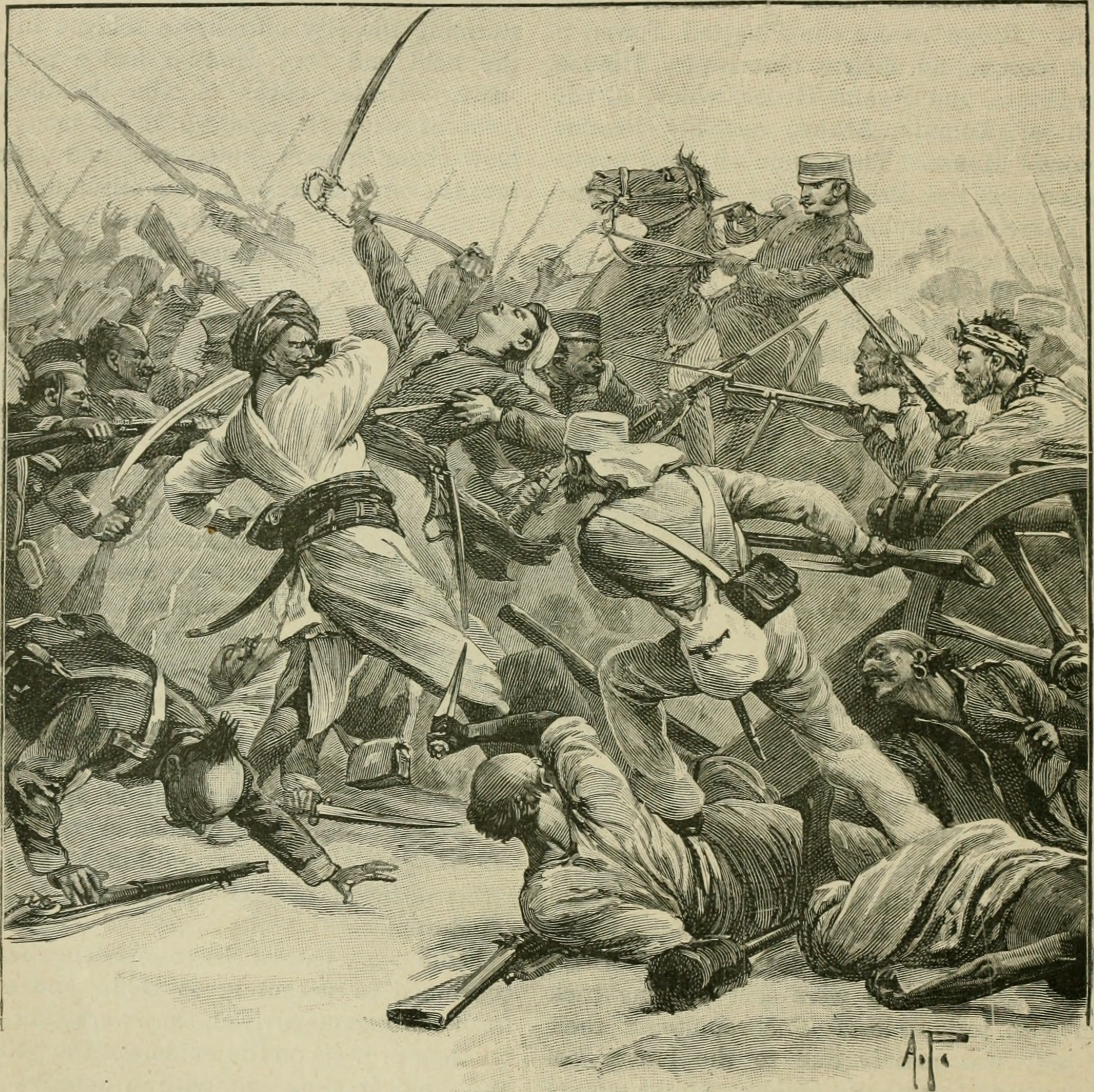
It was Bayonet to Bayonet, 1901. The Siege of Delhi in 1857

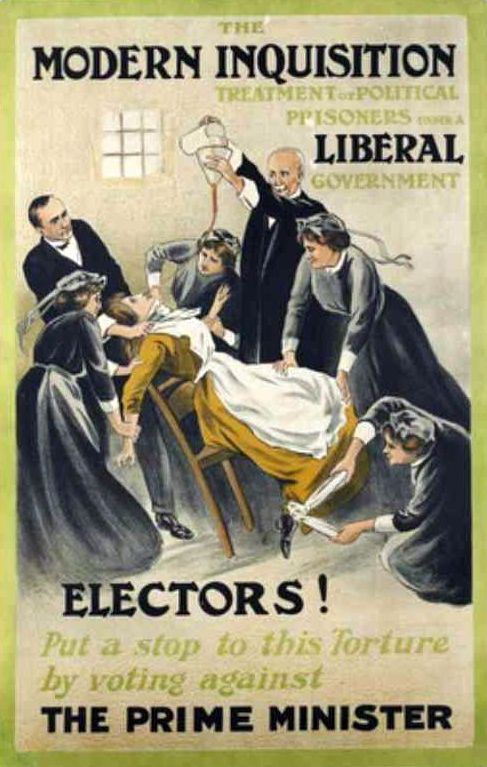
Women's Social & Political Union poster, 1910
Artist: A Patriot

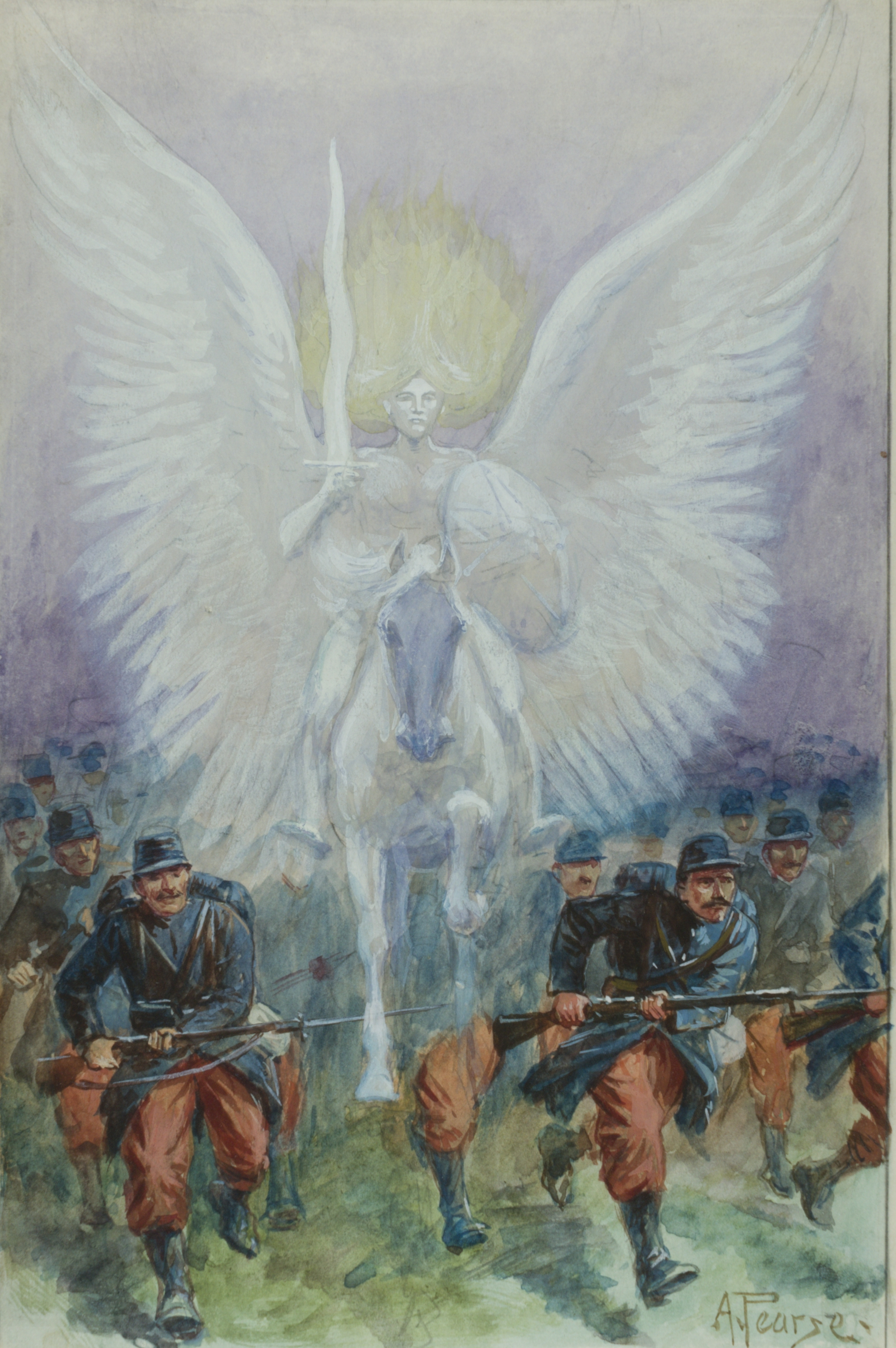
Spirit of War, 1914

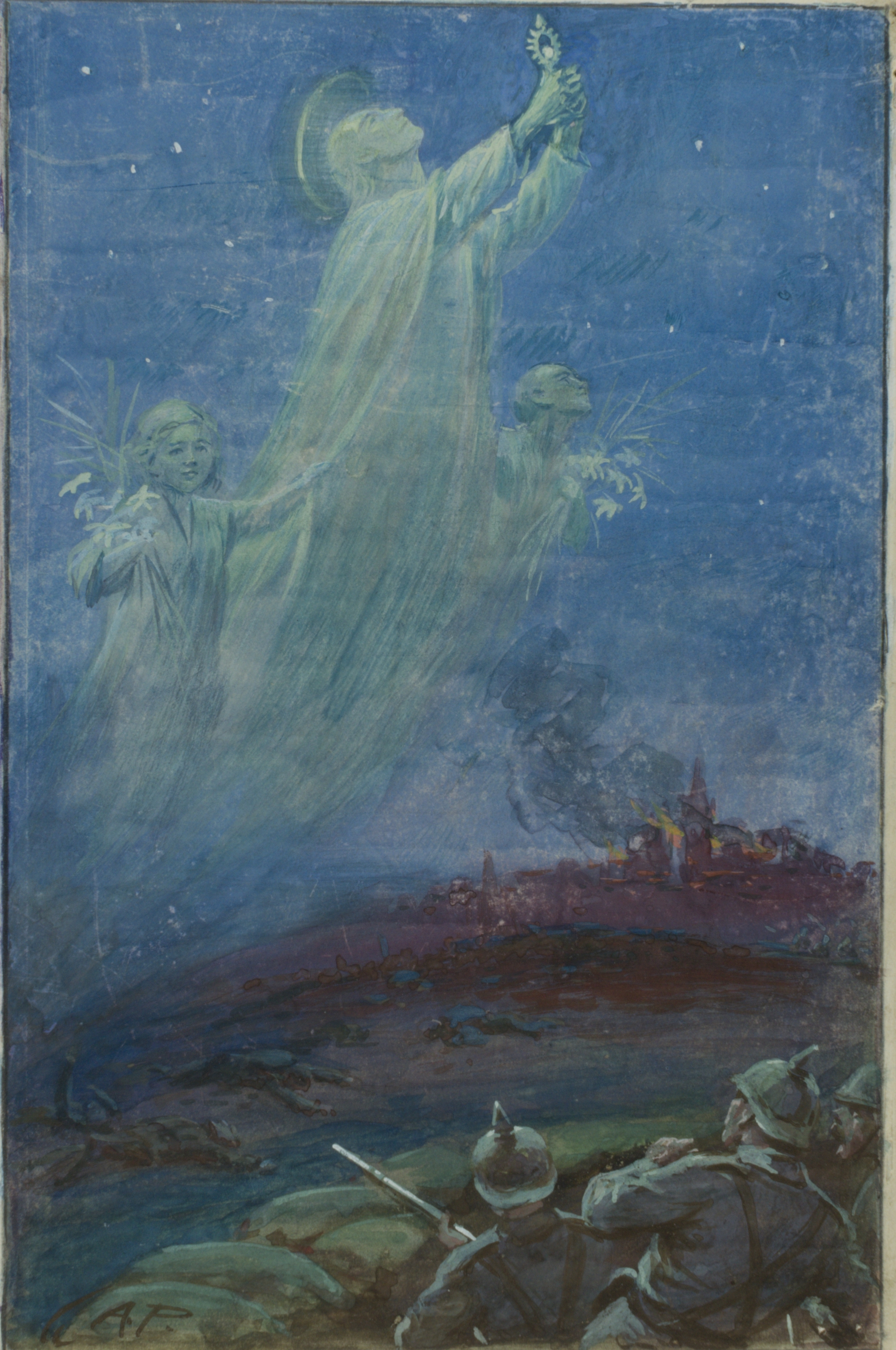
The Angel of Mons, 1915

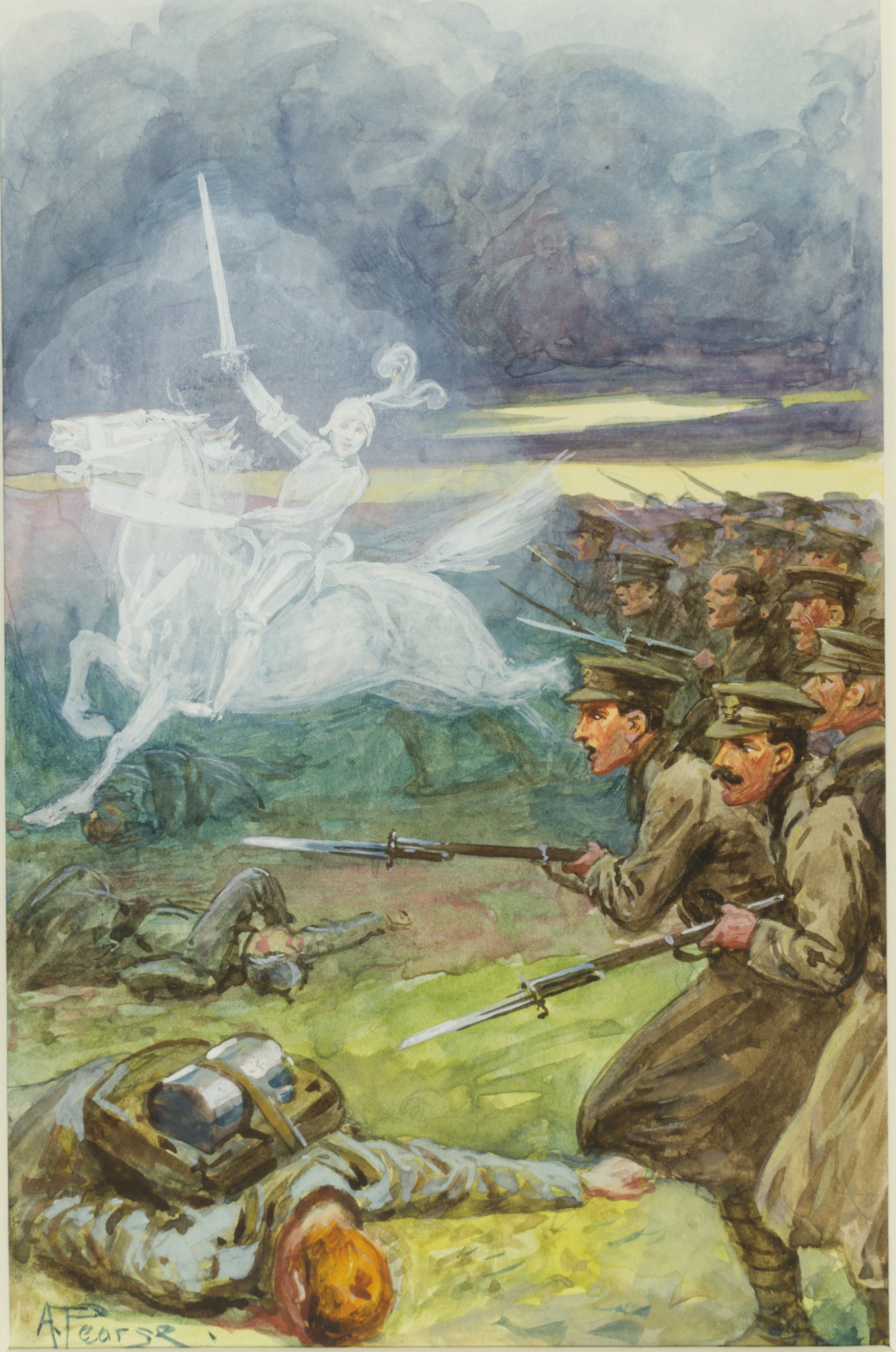
Saint George, 1915
