= Votes for Women (newspaper) =

British suffragist newspaper (1907–1918)

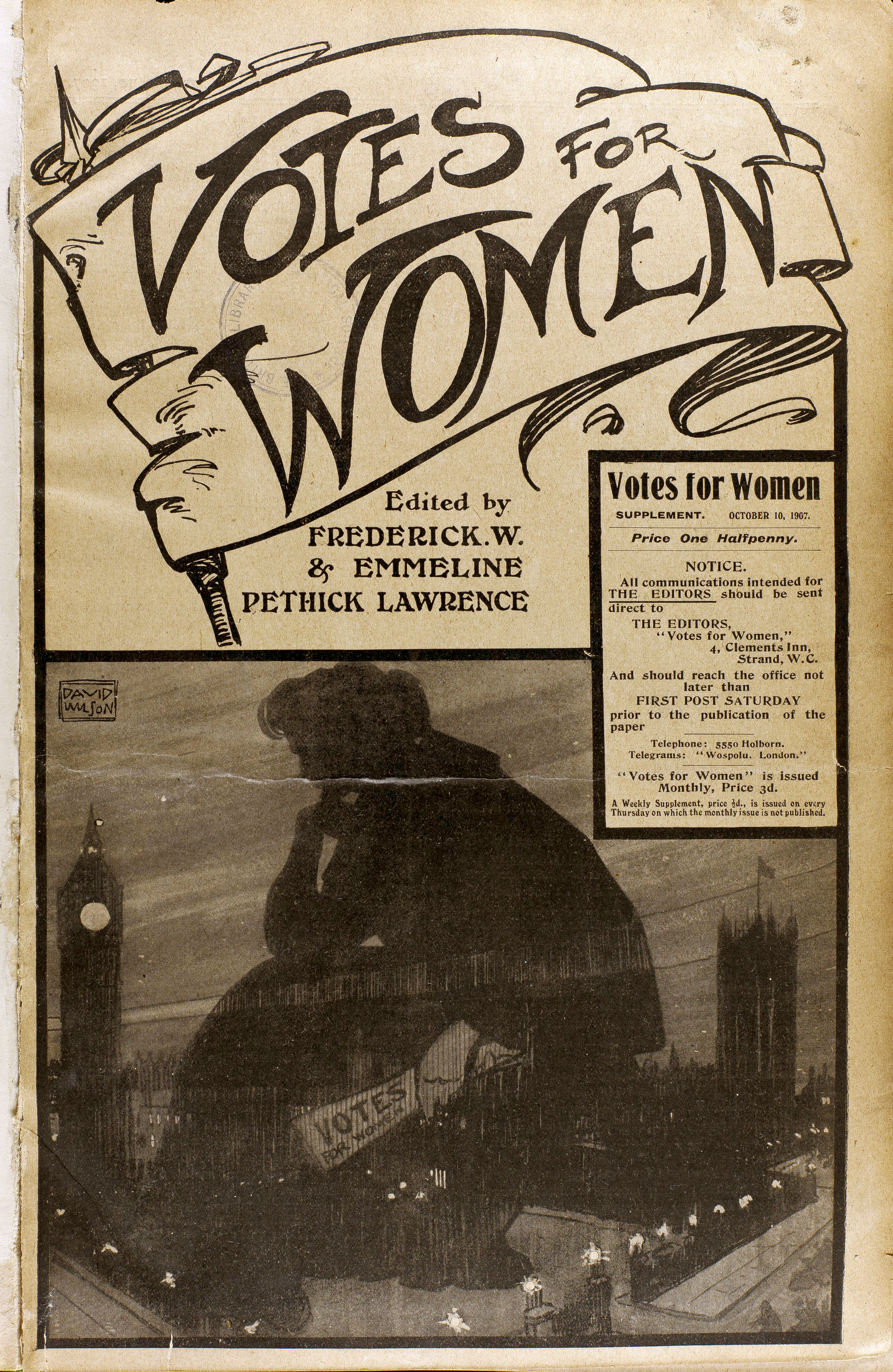
- Votes for Women supplement of 10 October 1907
- Editor: Emmeline and Frederick Pethick-Lawrence
- Categories: Newspaper
- Frequency: Weekly (from 1908)
- Publisher: St. Clement's Press
- Total circulation: 33,000 (1910)
- Founded: October 1907; 118 years ago
- Final issue: 1918
- Country: United Kingdom
- Language: English

Votes for Women was a newspaper associated with the women's suffrage movement in the United Kingdom. Until 1912, it was the official newspaper of the Women's Social and Political Union, the leading suffragette organisation. Subsequently, it continued with a smaller circulation, at first independently, and then as the publication of the United Suffragists. The paper was succeeded by The Suffragette.

== History ==
The newspaper was founded and financed in October 1907 by Emmeline and Frederick Pethick-Lawrence. The couple became joint editors of the newspaper, which was published by the St. Clement's Press. It was adopted as the official newspaper of the Women's Social and Political Union (WSPU), already the leading militant suffragette organisation in the country. Many copies were sold by WSPU members standing on the street. The pavement sellers were often harassed by passersby, and were forced to stand in the gutter lest the police arrest them for "obstruction of the pavement".

Initially, the newspaper cost 3d and was published monthly, with weekly supplements bringing it up-to-date. In April 1908, its publication was increased to a weekly frequency, and the following month the price was dropped to only 1d. During this period, the WSPU viewed the paper as a tool for recruitment and fundraising, and devoted much time to increasing its circulation. Posters advertising the paper were designed in 1903 and a new design in 1909 by Hilda Dallas, an artist in the Suffrage Atelier. Each summer, WSPU members were urged to recruit new subscribers while they were on seaside holidays, and use the posters to encourage sales.

The paper was redesigned in 1909 and its page size was increased and a new poster design launched. The WSPU launched a major advertising campaign, including Helen Craggs and others on an omnibus touring London, and established permanent sales pitches in central London. This took circulation to a peak of 33,000 a week in early 1910. Suffragists also advertised their organisations and companies in the paper, such as Rhoda Anstey who placed regular adverts for her courses at the Anstey College of Physical Education; Ethel Ayres Purdie who placed adverts for her accountancy firm and encouraged women to collect a portion of their income tax; Sime Seruya who advertised the opening of the "International Suffrage Shop"; and Elspeth Douglas McCleland who placed adverts for furniture made in suffrage colours. The secretary of Emmeline Pankhurst employed the chauffeur Aileen Preston through an advert in the paper.

In 1912, the Pethick-Lawrences were arrested, and Evelyn Sharp briefly assumed the editorship of the paper. Subsequently, the Pethick-Lawrences were expelled from the WSPU, and thereafter they published the newspaper independently, its supporters being organised in the Votes for Women Fellowship. This group was intended to encompass members of a variety of women's suffrage organisations, whether militant or non-militant. The Fellowship formed groups across the country, which focused their time on education. This convinced some members that they should form a new campaigning group. In February 1914, Votes for Women announced the formation of the United Suffragists, in which the Pethick-Lawrences became active, and in August they transferred control of the newspaper to the new group. Sharp then took over sole editorship of the newspaper.

== Later years ==
The paper continued to appear during World War I, but with a much-reduced circulation, and it struggled to remain financially viable. Sharp reoriented the paper to appeal more to middle-class women, with the slogan "The War Paper for Women". Although she personally came to oppose the war, she ensured that the paper maintained a neutral stance on it. Women's suffrage was enacted by degrees beginning in 1918, and in March of that year the United Suffragists dissolved itself, the newspaper also ceasing to appear.

== Notable contributors ==
- Beatrice Harraden
- Mildred Mansel
- Christabel Marshall
- Emmeline Pethick-Lawrence
- Frederick Pethick-Lawrence
- Elizabeth Robins
- Evelyn Sharp
- Helen Swanwick

== Gallery ==
Votes for Women

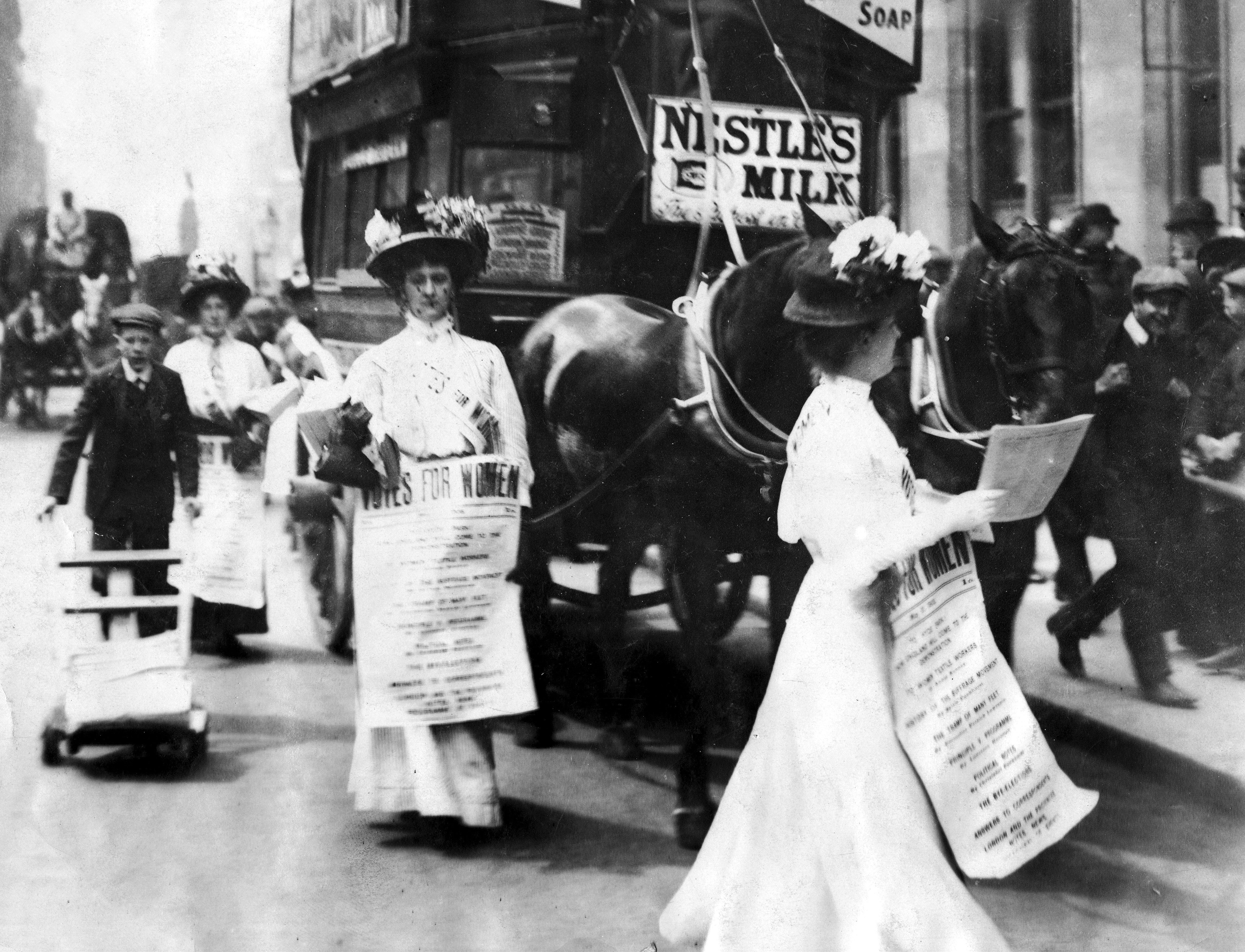
Women selling the newspaper on Fleet Street in London, in 1908.

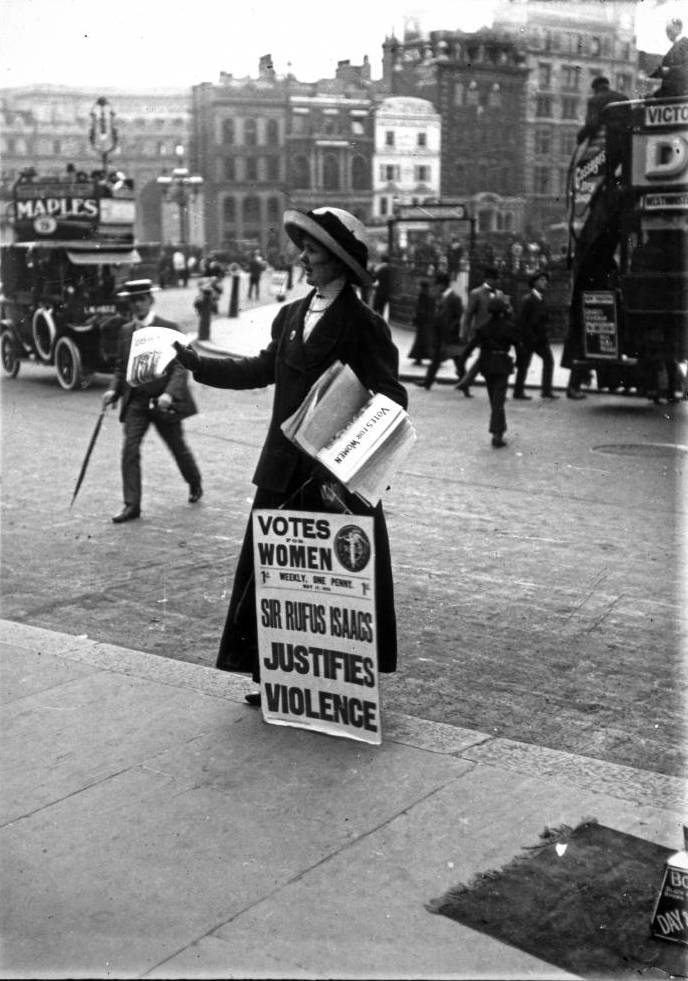
Selling in the street

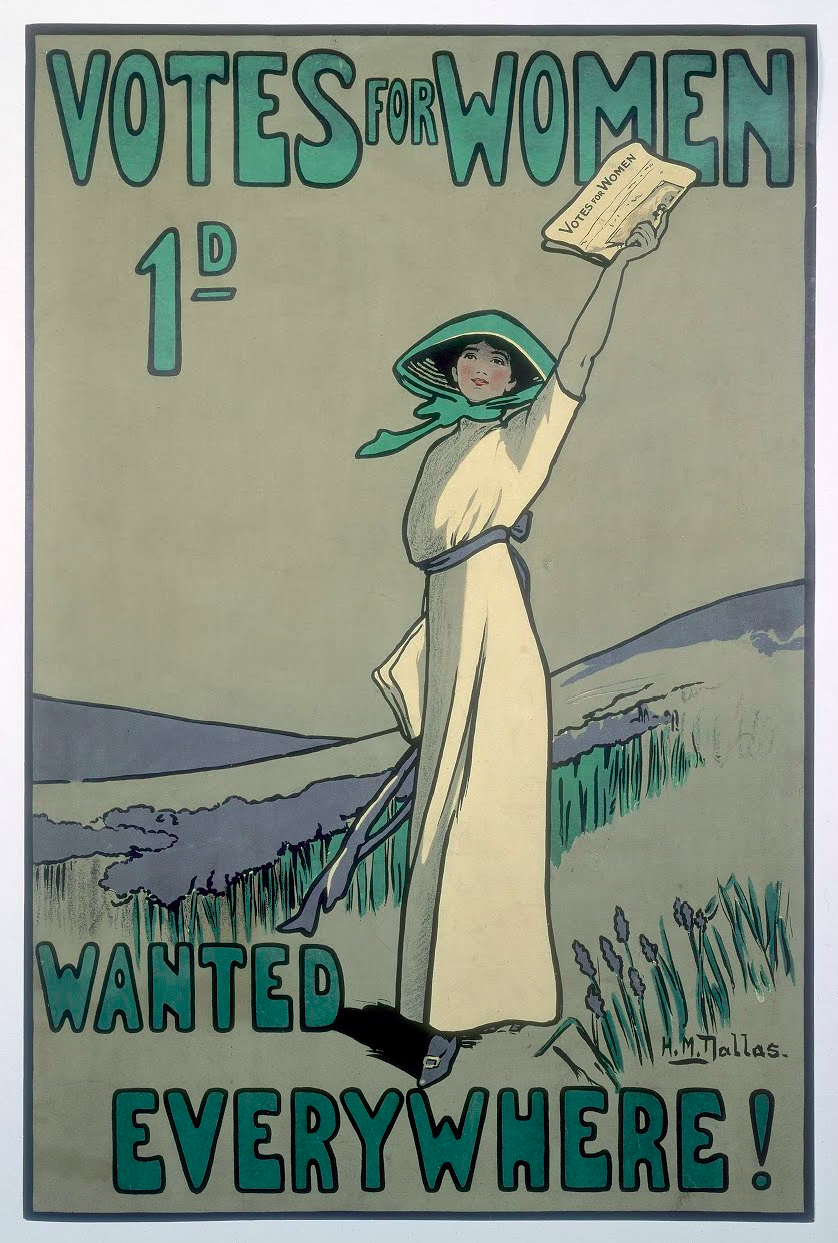
Poster for Votes for Women by Hilda Dallas (1909)

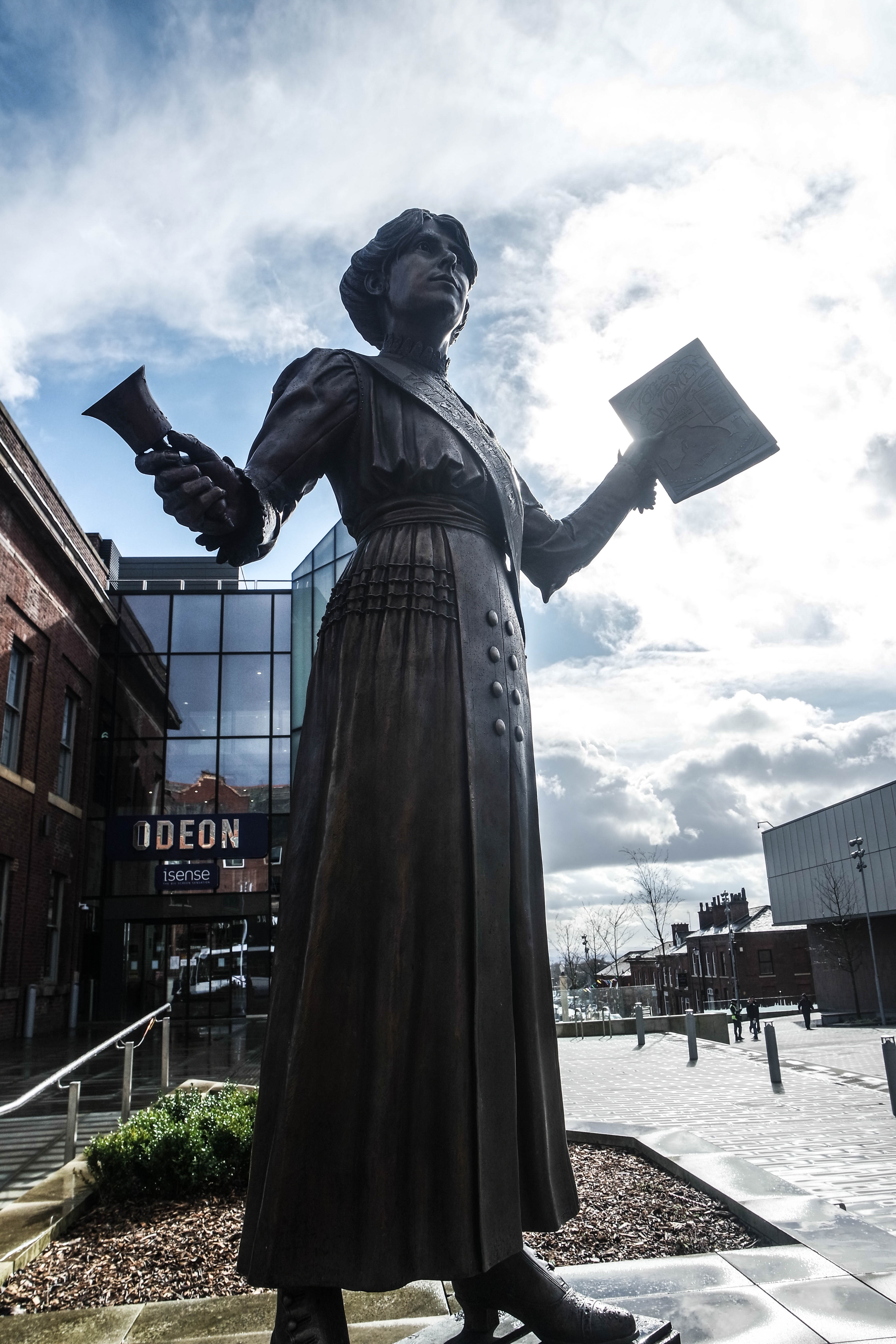
Annie Kenney's statue in Oldham with a copy of Votes for Women

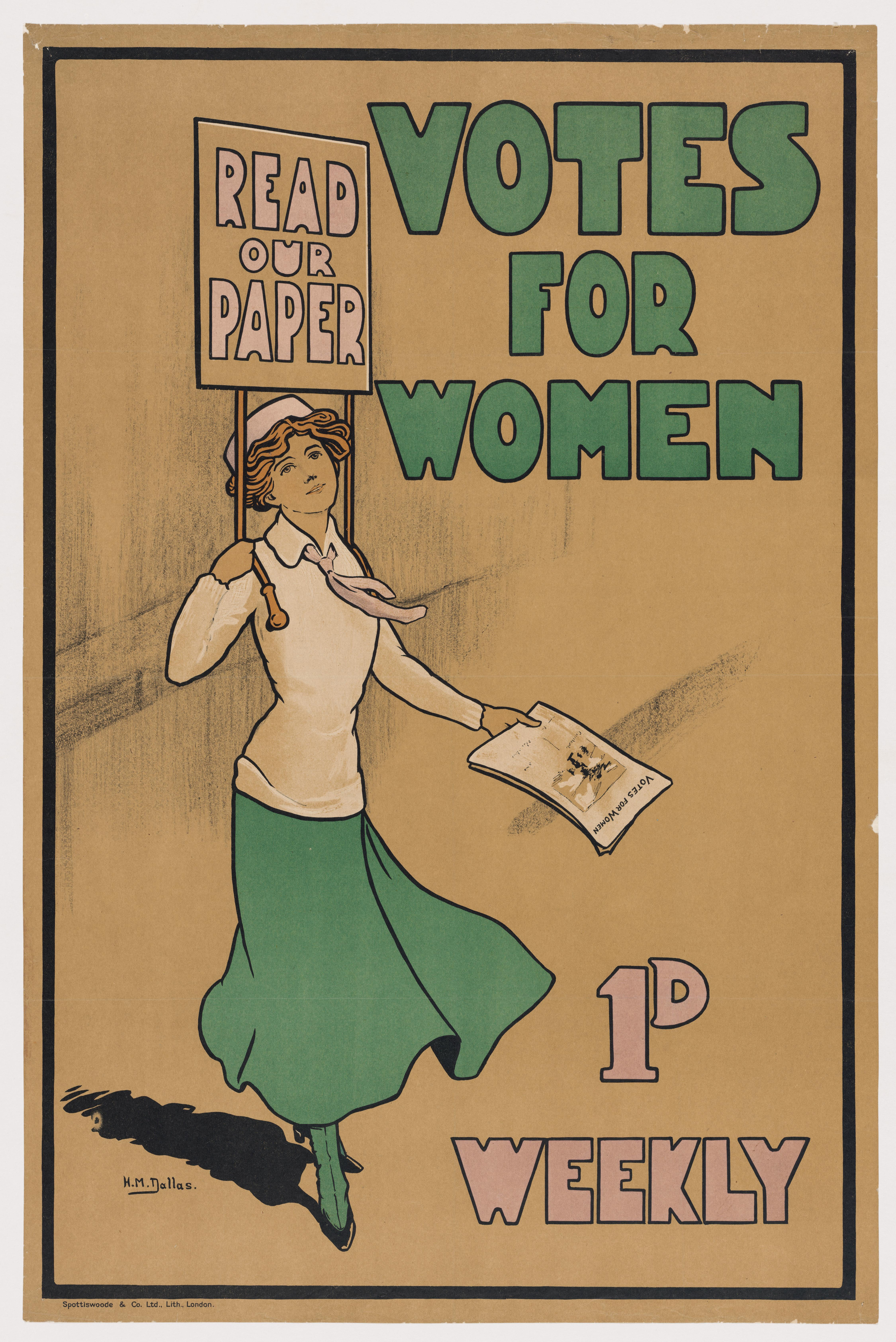
Votes for Women poster (1903 onwards) by Hilda Dallas

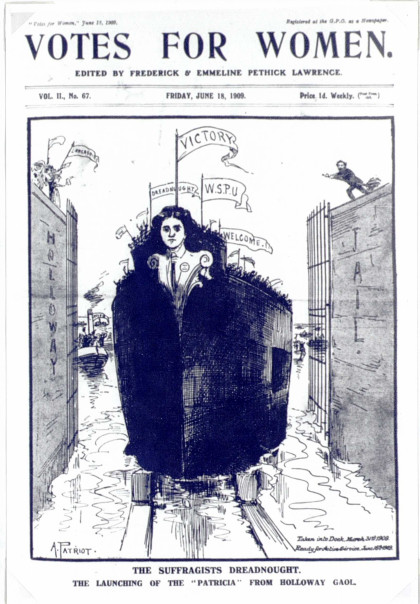
Votes for Women cover by Alfred Pearce, featuring Patricia Woodlock as a dreadnought, May 1909

== See also ==
- List of women's suffrage publications
- The Suffragette (newspaper)
