= Katherine Douglas Smith =

British suffragette (born 1878)

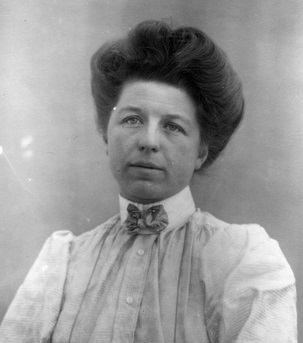
- Douglas Smith c. 1910
- Organization(s): Women's Social and Political Union; International Suffrage Club

Katherine Douglas Smith (1878 – after 1947) was a militant British suffragette and from 1908 a paid organiser of the Women's Social and Political Union (WSPU). She was also a member of the International Suffrage Club.

== Activism ==
Douglas Smith was the daughter of a professor of surgery at King's College, London and a militant member of the WSPU. In 1908 she campaigned with Annie Kenney and Mary Blathwayt around the seaside towns of the west of England and Wales and on one occasion in Pembrokeshire the three women had to share a small and cramped room.

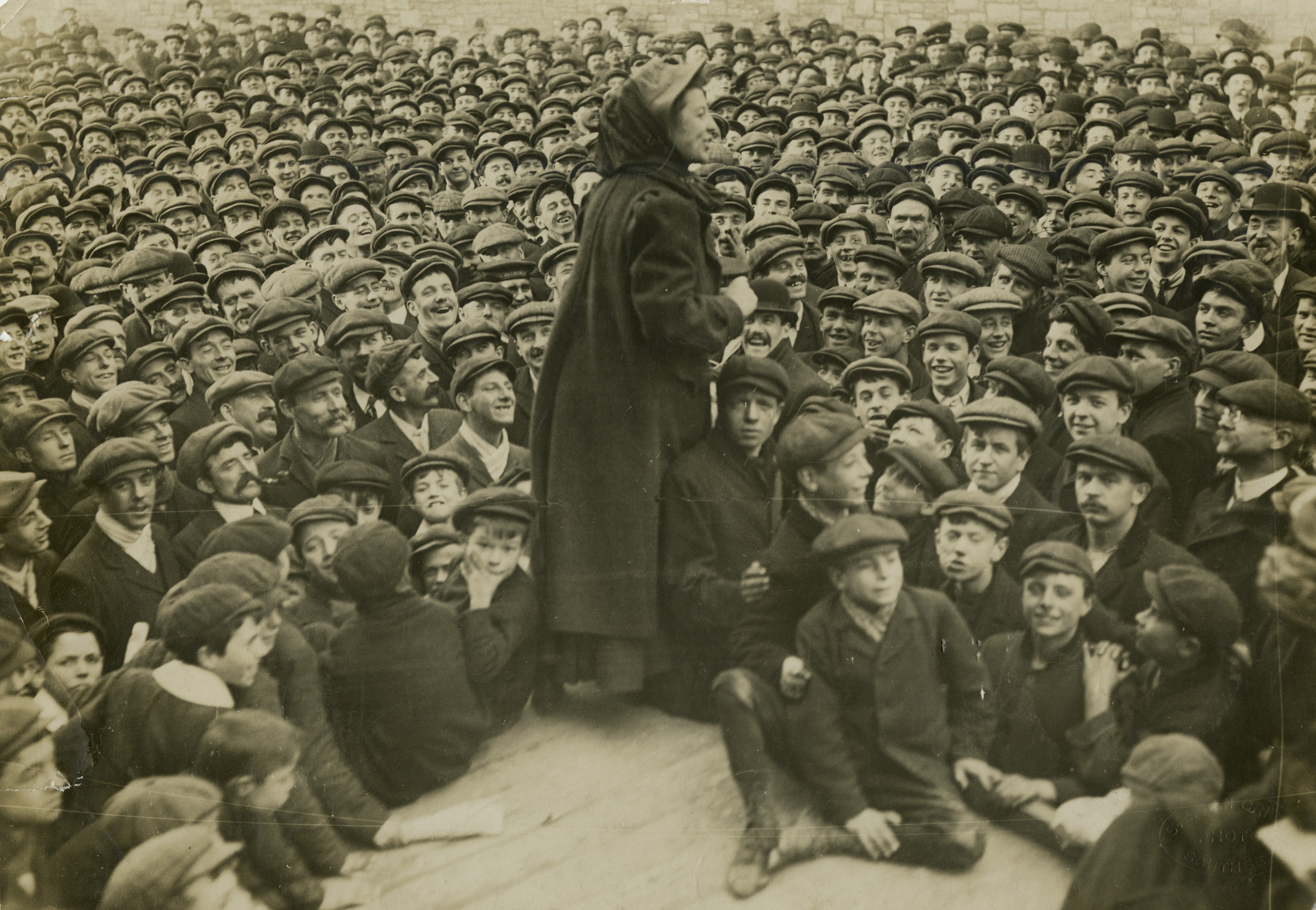
Katherine Douglas Smith addressing a crowd of men at Portsmouth c. 1910

On 21 June 1908 Douglas Smith was a key speaker at a rally of suffragettes at Hyde Park in London. The rally was organised for Women's Sunday when twenty platforms were erected in the Park from which leading suffragettes delivered speeches. Also in 1908, Douglas Smith took part in a protest at the House of Commons in London which was led by Marion Wallace Dunlop, while on 24 January 1909 Douglas Smith and suffragettes Irene Dallas and Mary Jane Clarke, the younger sister of Emmeline Pankhurst, took a taxi to 10 Downing Street. There had been a demonstration in Downing Street earlier that day so by the time Douglas Smith and the other women arrived the street had been sealed off with a cordon of police officers. Douglas Smith and Clarke persuaded the officers to allow their taxi to pass through the cordon which then drove up to the door of No 10 where they were arrested. After appearing at Bow Street Magistrates' Court on 2 February 1909 Douglas Smith was sent to Holloway Prison for a month. Emmeline Pankhurst wrote to the journalist C. P. Scott expressing concern at the treatment her sister and Douglas Scott were receiving at the hands of the authorities. Shortly after Scott visited Douglas Smith in prison. While in prison the scholarly Douglas Smith requested "to be allowed the use of pencil or pen or note book in order that those studies which I am able to make here – being allowed French German and History books – may be furthered." She was released from prison on 27 February 1909 following which she and other released suffragette prisoners attended a celebratory breakfast organised by the WSPU.

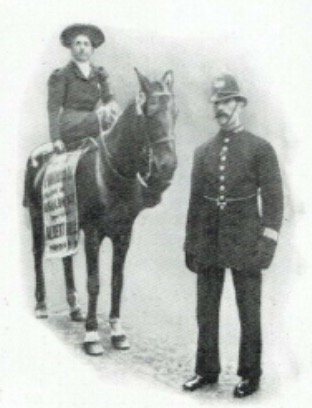
"The Equestrienne Suffragist" – Douglas Smith on horseback on the Strand – The Bystander, 4 November 1908

In another imaginative protest in October 1908 organised with Maud Joachim Douglas Smith and Joachim held up traffic in the West End by the two riding black bay horses up the Strand, at the same time advertising a suffragette meeting at the Royal Albert Hall. On her death Maud Joachim left Douglas Smith a legacy in her will.

In August 1909 Prime Minister H. H. Asquith was persuaded by Sir Herbert Leon to attend an event organised by him at his home at Bletchley Park in which Asquith would address an audience of 2,000. This opportunity to confront the Prime Minister proved irresistible to the suffragettes who organised a campaign over several days to coincide with his visit. Maud Joachim and Douglas Smith were the speakers at this protest. On the night before Asquith's visit the suffragettes Charlotte Marsh, Laura Ainsworth, Evelyn Wurrie (real name Evelyn Wharrie) and Nellie Hall gained access to the grounds, where they hid in a plantation of trees near to the marquee where Asquith was due to speak. On his arrival the four women rushed forward with megaphones shouting phrases such as "When are you going to give justice to women?" while Nellie Hall managed to chain herself to a tree. At the same time Douglas Smith, who was outside, climbed over a wall and made for the marquee before being chased by 12 men and caught.

On 18 February 1910 Katherine Douglas Smith planted a pine tree – a pseudotsuga douglasii glauca – a Douglas fir – at Eagle House where members of the suffragette movement were invited to stay and plant trees to celebrate a prison sentence.

For the July 1911 edition of Votes for Women, Douglas Smith wrote a review of a recent biography of St Catherine of Siena which possibly shows she had an interest in religious matters. When in 1911 Christabel Pankhurst's leadership of the WSPU was criticised from within its own ranks Douglas Smith wrote to the suffragist publication The Freewoman stating "all of us who serve under that banner do so of our own free will; for us no press-gang has existed, and we can leave at any moment." In 1912 she was among the speakers at a suffragette demonstration in Alexandra Park in Ipswich.

Katherine Douglas Smith died sometime after the death of her friend Maud Joachim in 1947.
