= Clemence Housman =

English author and illustrator (1861–1955)

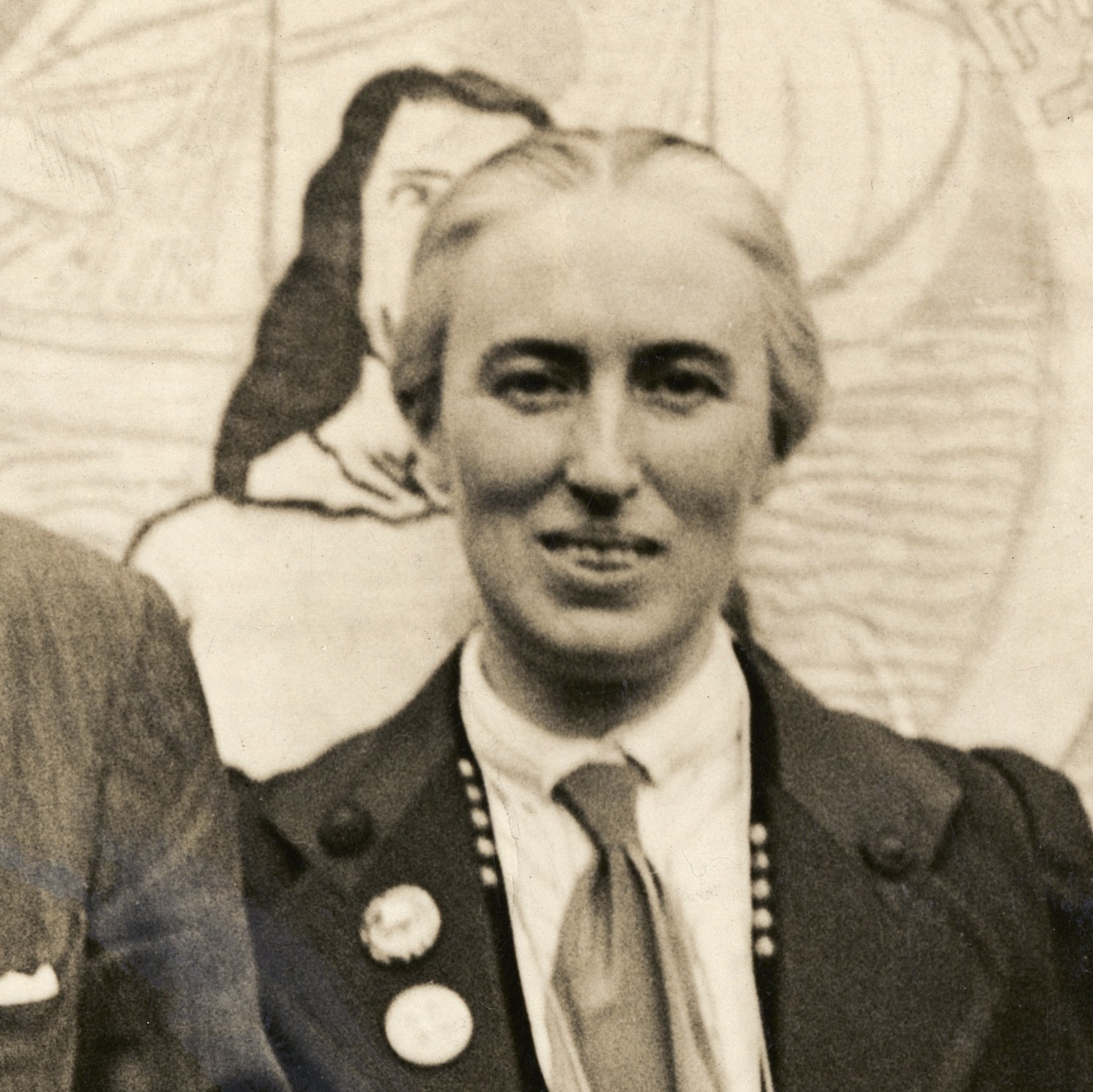
- Housman in 1910
- Born: 23 November 1861; Bromsgrove, Worcestershire, England
- Died: 6 December 1955 (aged 94)
- Education: South London School of Technical Art
- Occupations: Author; illustrator; women's suffrage activist
- Employer: Suffrage Atelier
- Organizations: Women's Social and Political Union; Women's Tax Resistance League
- Relatives: A. E. Housman (brother); Laurence Housman (brother)

Clemence Annie Housman (23 November 1861 – 6 December 1955) was an author, illustrator and women's suffrage activist. She was the sister of A. E. Housman and Laurence Housman. Her novels included The Were-Wolf, Unknown Sea and The Life of Sir Aglovale De Galis. She was also a leading figure in the suffragette movement.

== Life ==
Clemence was born in Bromsgrove, Worcestershire. She went to the South London School of Technical Art in 1883 where she learned, among other things, wood-engraving. She worked for a time as an engraver for illustrated papers such as The Graphic.

In 1908 she subscribed to the Women's Social and Political Union (WSPU), and in 1909 she was a co-founder, with her brother Laurence Housman, of the Suffrage Atelier. Here, she made banners for the suffrage movement between 1908 and 1914, with her brother describing how she "wore herself out" sitting on the floor and doing needlework for the cause. She also created designs for publications of the WSPU's Women's Press, ran print making workshops for fellow suffrage campaigners to print literature and organised exhibitions.

In 1910 Houseman became a member of the committee of the Women's Tax Resistance League. She also boycotted the 1911 census, writing "No Vote No Census Clemence Housman" across her form. She was arrested on 30 September 1911 for non-payment of her taxes. She was sent to Holloway Prison, but she was released after just one week following protests and demonstrations by her supporters.

She lived with her brother Laurence for much of her life. After World War I, they lived in a cottage in the village of Ashley in Hampshire, and then, in 1924, moved to Street, Somerset. She died in December 1955 aged 94.

== Works ==
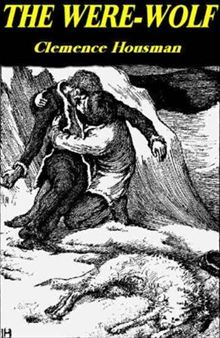
The Were-wolf by Housman (artwork by Laurence Housman, LH)

Clemence published three novels, and she illustrated some of the fantasies written by her brother Laurence. Each of Housman's novels is a "Christian fantasy", dramatising religious themes. Her first novel, The Were-wolf (1896), was an allegorical erotic fantasy featuring a female werewolf. H. P. Lovecraft said of the Were-Wolf that it "attains a high degree of gruesome tension and achieves to some extent the atmosphere of authentic folklore." Basil Copper described The Were-wolf as "a minor classic in the genre". The Life of Sir Aglovale de Galis is an Arthurian fantasy. Edith Pargeter praised The Life of Sir Aglovale de Galis, calling the novel "the finest work on an Arthurian theme since Mallory". Douglas A. Anderson has described The Life of Sir Aglovale de Galis as Housman's "supreme achievement". "The Drawn Arrow" (1923) is a short fable set in a desert kingdom.

=== Novels ===
- Clemence Housman (1896), The Were-wolf, London: J. Lane at the Bodley Head, OL 13492113M – illustrated by Laurence Housman.
- Clemence Housman (1898), Unknown Sea, London: Duckworth, OL 7217479M
- Clemence Housman (1905), The Life of Sir Aglovale De Galis (The life of Sir Aglovale de Galis ed.), London: Methuen, OL 7233562M

=== As illustrator ===
- Laurence Housman, The Blue Moon (1904) – illustrations by L.H., engraved by C.H.
- Laurence Housman (1922), Moonshine & Clover, Illustrated by Clemence Housman, New York: Harcourt, Brace, OCLC 6553308, OL 7073215M
