= Suffrage Atelier =

Artists' collective, campaigned for women's suffrage

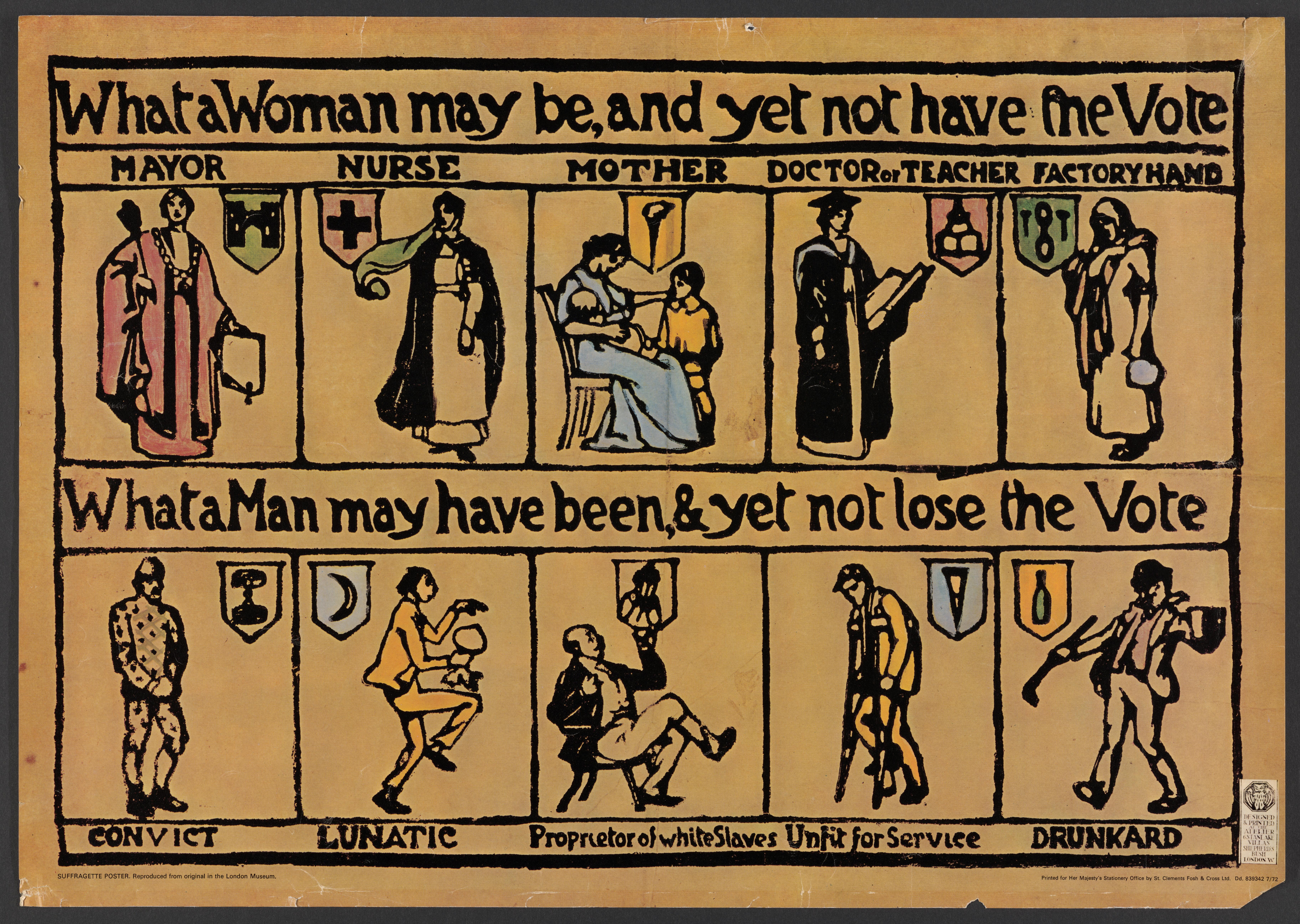
What a woman may be and yet not have the vote, created by the Suffrage Atelier

Suffrage Atelier was an artists' collective campaigning for women's suffrage in England. It was founded in February 1909 by Laurence Housman, Clemence Housman and Alfred Pearse. Clemence was a writer, illustrator, and wood engraver, and her brother Laurence was a fantasy writer.

The Atelier, which became a major political entity, accepted as its members women who were professional illustrators and writers but also encouraged non-professional artists to submit work, and paid them a small percentage of any profits. It held its first public meeting in London in February 1909, styling itself as an "Arts and Crafts Society working for the enfranchisement of women".

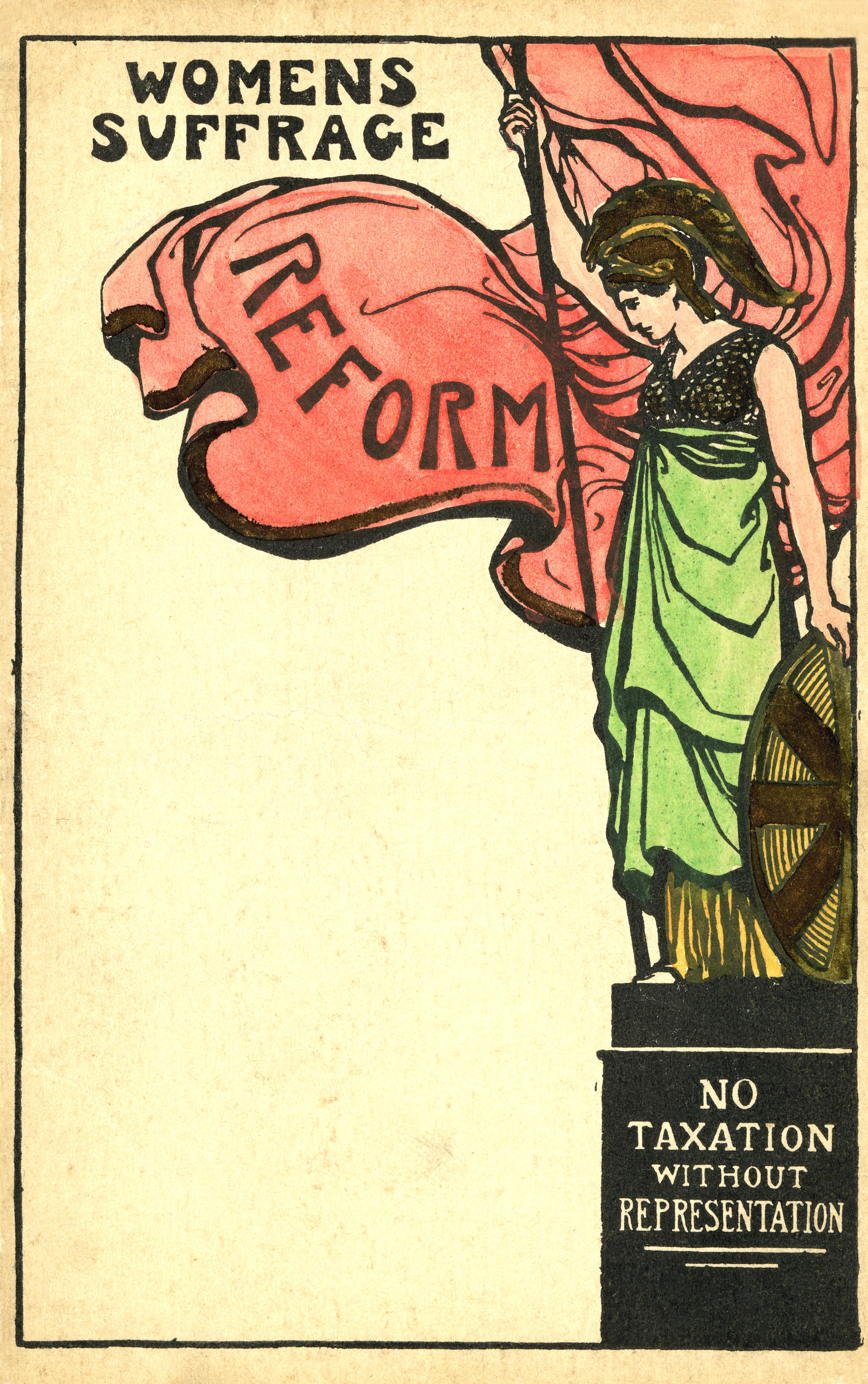
Suffrage Atelier postcard, c.1909–1914 (38003316525)

The collective is supposed to have been formed as a result of collaboration between members of the Kensington Branch of the Women's Social and Political Union who worked together to produce a banner entitled From Prison to Citizenship, which was designed by the Housmans.

It ran printmaking, banner-making, drawing and stenciling workshops and held competitions. The Suffrage Atelier's policy was to produce only what could be quickly reproduced and circulated and so made great use of block-printing, both in wood and as linocuts in response to events. Clemence Housman was a well-respected member of the WSPU, so much of the production of the Suffrage Atelier was distributed in the WSPU store chains and national newspaper.

One of the first requests for the work of the organisation was for stock for the art stall at the WSPU's 1909 Princes' Skating Rink Exhibition. In the main, the Atelier worked with the Women's Freedom League and in December 1909 it produced a banner entitled Let Glasgow Flourish for the Glasgow Central WFL, and another banner for the Glasgow West branch.

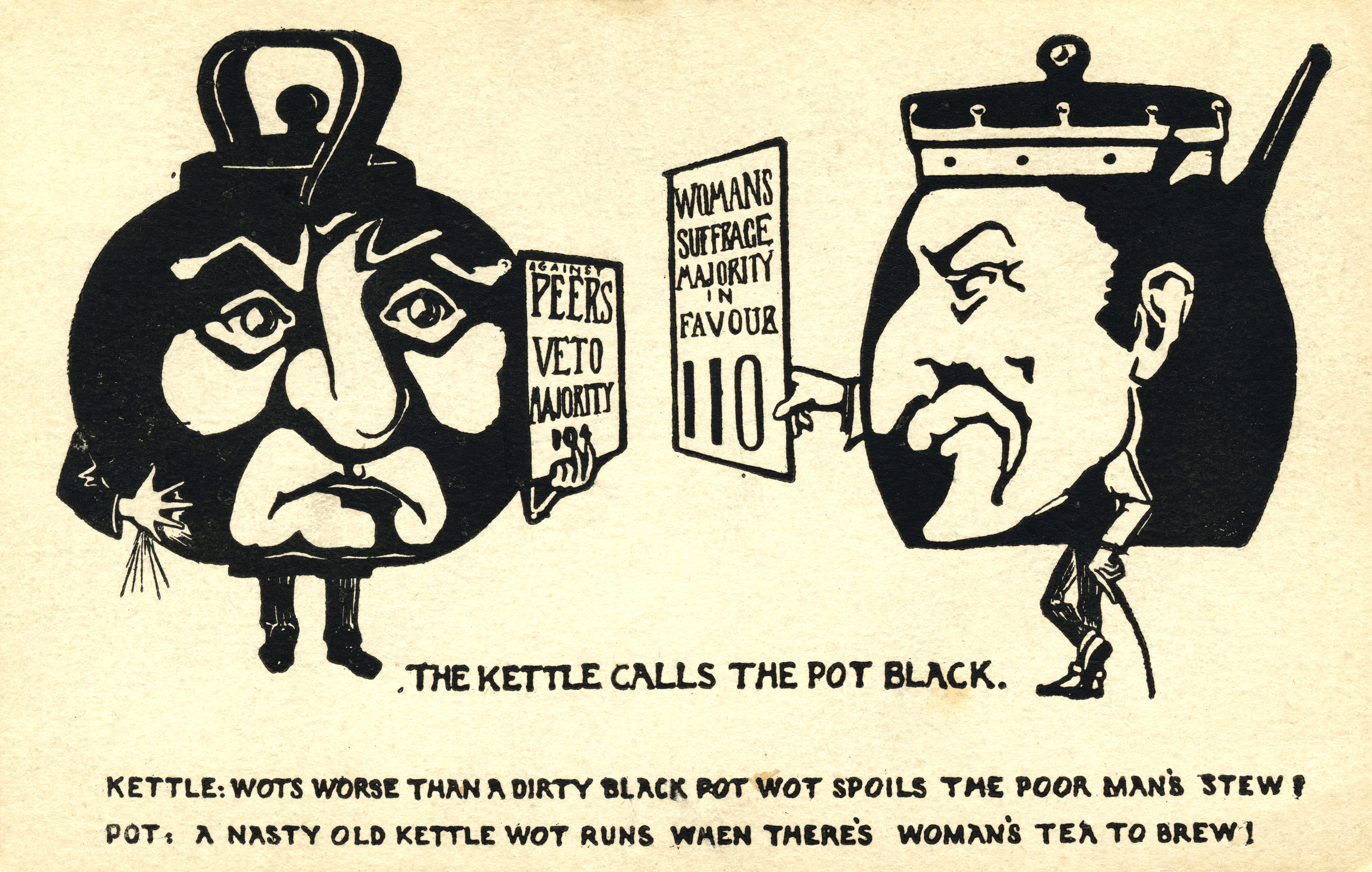
TWL.2000.71Postcard produced by the Suffrage Atelier

It also designed and produced a banner for the Tax Resistance League, which was carried in a procession on 18 June 1910. In the Women's Coronation Procession in June 1911, the group carried their own banner which showed Athena with her symbols of the owl, olive, cock, serpent, sphynx the Victory and Medusa head.

The Suffrage Atelier had a large body of subscribers that included both men and non-professionals. Subscribers were encouraged to submit fine art, poster and post card designs, craft work, and donations. Subscribers also helped organize pageants and exhibitions.

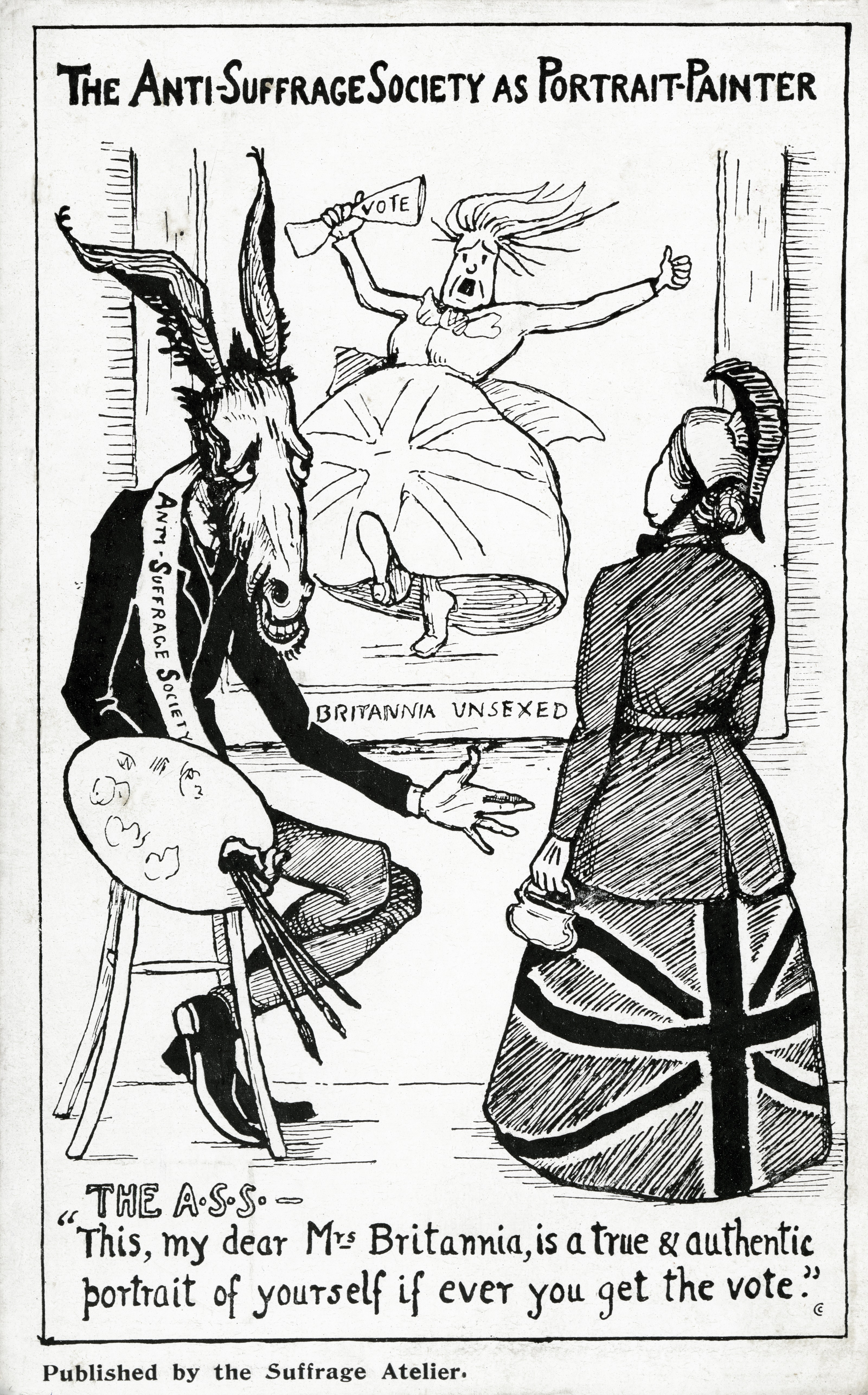
Postcard which satirises the Anti Suffrage Society (ASS) by the Suffrage Atelier

== Members ==
- Catherine Courtauld
- Edith Craig
- Hilda Dallas
- Isobel Pocock
- Gladys Letcher
- A.E. Hope Joseph
- Katharine Gatty (Secretary from 1912)
- Miss E.B. Willis (Honorary Secretary 1909–14).
- Pamela Colman Smith

== See also ==
- List of suffragists and suffragettes
- List of women's rights activists
- Timeline of women's suffrage
- Women's suffrage in the United Kingdom
- Women's suffrage publications
