= Kenney family =

Related British suffragist sisters

British suffragists in the early 20th century, who were siblings

- Sarah Ellen (Nell) Kenney Clarke (1876–1953)
- Ann (Annie) Kenney (1879–1953)
- Caroline (Kitty) Kenney (1880–1952)
- Jane (Jenny) Kenney (1884–1961)
- Jessica (Jessie) Kenney (1887–1985)
