= Rowland Kenney =

British propagandist

Rowland Kenney (28 December 1882 – 1961) was a British diplomat, propagandist, author and editor. During World War I and World War II, Kenney directed British propaganda in Norway and Scandinavia.

== Early life ==
Kenney was born on 28 December 1882 in Springhead, West Riding of Yorkshire (now part of Oldham). He was a son of Horatio Nelson Kenney (1849–1912), a cotton-mill worker, and Ann (née Wood, 1852–1905). He was one of twelve children, eleven of whom survived infancy. His sisters included the suffragettes Annie Kenney, Nell Kenney, Kitty Kenney, Jenny Kenney and Jessie Kenney. Their parents encouraged reading, debating, and socialism.

== Career ==
During his youth and early adulthood, Kenney worked a series of manual labour jobs, before beginning work as a salesman, and joining the Shop Assistants Union and the Independent Labour Party. His work for various socialist organisations resulted in him becoming a journalist and later an editor of the Daily Herald, and briefly a publisher of Vanity Fair.

In 1911 Kenney married Dano-Norwegian Asta Ingrid Brockdorff (1883–1947) and spent some time in Norway before the beginning of the First World War.

== First World War ==
In 1916, with war raging in Europe, Kenney was recommended to the Foreign Office as an agent who could assess the propaganda situation in Norway. Having compiled a report, Kenney was subsequently offered the job of press attaché in the British Legation (now Embassy) in Norway's capital Christiania (now Oslo). As press attaché, Kenney communicated with Norwegian editors and publishers and, while pretending to be a Reuters correspondent, supplied Norwegian media with British propaganda. He was also instrumental in eliminating German influence from the Norwegian Telegram Bureau (NTB).

After World War I, Kenney, still working for the Foreign Office, travelled to Poland to assess the political situation and reported back to the British delegation for the Treaty of Versailles. Returning from Versailles to England in 1918, Kenney suffered an airplane crash and survived with lasting injuries. He continued during the inter-war years to work for various government institutions associated with the Foreign Office. In particular, he was a major operator for the establishment of the British Council. During this time, he wrote his autobiography Westering, published in 1939.

== Second World War ==
As World War II loomed in 1939, Kenney was sent back to Oslo, again as press attaché. His mission was the same as for World War I, but it was ended by the German invasion of Norway during April 1940. Fleeing Oslo, Kenney found himself with a small contingent of British diplomats and intelligence officers, including Frank Foley and Margaret Reid. They made their escape to Åndalsnes. During this time, Kenney communicated with Norwegian officials seeking to establish Allied news services in Norway, as well as the Norwegian officer Martin Linge, who would later become a commander in the Norwegian resistance forces. Evacuated to Britain, Kenney continued to work to provide Norway and the Scandinavian countries with Allied news and propaganda. In 1942, he was seconded to the Norwegian government-in-exile and was later awarded the Order of St. Olav for his work.

== Later life ==
After the war, Kenney returned briefly to Norway as a diplomat, and published The Northern Tangle, a history of Scandinavia. He died in 1961, survived by his only child, Kit Kenney (1913–1988).
