= Saul Solomon (disambiguation) =

Saul Solomon (1817–1892) was a politician of the Cape Colony.

Saul Solomon may also refer to:

- Saul Solomon (photographer) (1836–1929), Australian artist and politician
- Saul Solomon (New Zealand barrister) (1857–1937), New Zealand lawyer and King's Counsel (1907)
- Saul Solomon (judge) (1875–1960), South African judge and King's Counsel (1919)
