= Jessica Garretson Finch =

American educator, author and activist

Jessica Garretson Finch (August 19, 1871 – October 31, 1949) was an American educator, author, women's rights activist, founder of the Lenox School for girls, and founding president of Finch College.

== Early life ==
Finch was born on August 19, 1871, the daughter of Congregational minister Rev. Ferdinand Van De Vere Garretson and Helen Philbrick Garretson. When she was 12, the family moved from New York, where her father was rector of Grace Chapel on West 22nd Street, to Franconia, New Hampshire. She attended Dow Academy and the Cambridge Latin School before entering Barnard College. Finch received her A.B. from Barnard College in 1893, the first graduating class of the new, women's college. She applied to attend law school at Columbia University, and was formally refused on the grounds that the Law School did not admit women. She earned her LL.B. from New York University School of Law in 1898.

== Career ==
She was a well-known suffragette, president of the New York Equal Franchise Society. Finch was an advocate of careers for women. Although in 1912 she self-described as an "orthodox Socialist", her views shifted and she was later described as a political "liberal".

She gave paid, public talks on the subject to young ladies as a part-time job to help support herself when she was a college student in the 1890s. After graduating from college, she continued to lecture to young ladies on a range of topics and also worked as a tutor in subjects including Greek.

She was a founding member of the Colony Club and was an author, penning such books as Mothers and Daughters, Psychology of Youth, and Flower and Kitchen Gardens.

In a February 1908 talk that Finch gave at the Civitas Club in New York City, she said:

Evolutionary and revolutionary methods [of education] will bring the real resurrection, the Renaissance of man! We are passing through an economic age, and though conservative folk are usually the most popular it is our real work to enlarge the social conscience; our ancestors barely kept themselves alive, we have made a living, and our descendants will pass ascetic beautiful lives, never selfishly nor foolishly, but on a solid foundation and for the advancement of all.

In June 1949 she was given a Doctorate of Humane Letters, honoris causa, by New York University. The citation described her as a graduate of the university's law school who had founded a women's college, "on the unorthodox postulate that every graduate should mother at least four children and cultivate a non-domestic avocation fore and aft."

== Finch College and Lenox School ==
Finch founded the Finch school in 1900 to provide career training for young women, saying that her own education at Barnard College had not given her or her classmates the skills needed to earn a living. Ironically, Finch became not a career-oriented college, but rather "one of the most famed of U.S. girls' finishing schools."

Finch founded the Finch School, later Finch Junior College, and, after 1952, Finch College, to enact her conviction that women ought to be prepared for careers. She envisioned a world in which women would work until they wed, at about age 25, bear and rear children for about fifteen years, before resuming paid employment at about age 40 and working for another thirty years.

Finch founded the college as the Finch School, a secondary school for girls. In 1916 she founded the Lenox School, a primary school to prepare girls to enter the Finch School. Lenox School employed Kitty Kenney and Jennie Kenney as joint heads until they retired in 1929. The Kenney sisters had been trained by Maria Montessori. They were two of the four sisters who were leading members of the militant Women's Social and Political Union. Kitty and Jennie had run a convalescent home in London for suffragettes recovering after they had been imprisoned and force fed.

== Family ==
She was married to James Wells Finch with whom she had a daughter, Elsie; the couple divorced. In 1913 Finch married John O'Hara Cosgrave, an editor of the New York World, who died in 1947.

She was the mother of Elsie Finch McKeogh, a New York literary agent.

== Death ==
Finch died at her home in Manhattan on October 31, 1949.

== See also ==
- List of suffragists and suffragettes
