= Daisy Solomon =

South African suffragette (1882–1978)

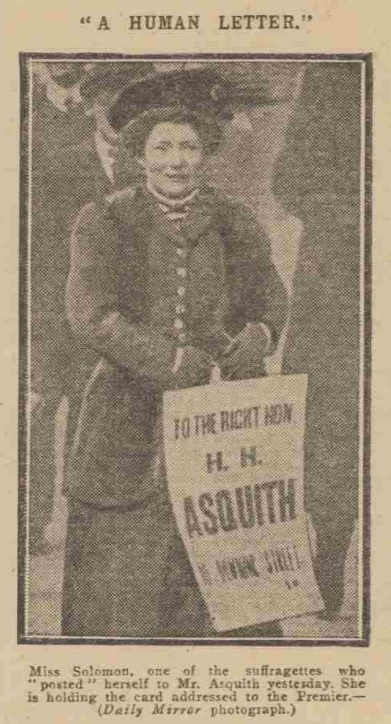
- Born: Daisy Dorothea Solomon; 1882; Cape Town, Cape Colony
- Died: 1978 (aged 95–96)
- Known for: suffragette activism, sent as a human letter to the Prime Minister and secretary to equal rights organisations
- Parents: Saul Solomon, liberal member of the first Cape Parliament (father); Georgiana Solomon, educator and suffragette (mother)
- Relatives: brother: Saul Solomon, Supreme Court judge South Africa brother: William Ewart Gladstone Solomon, principal Bombay School of Art India

Daisy Dorothea Solomon (1882–1978) was posted as a human letter in the British suffragette campaign using a quirk in the postal system to approach the Prime Minister who would not receive a delegation of women demanding the right to vote. Solomon was secretary to suffragette groups and imprisoned for protest, and went on hunger strike.

== Early life and family ==
Daisy Dorothea Solomon was born in 1882 in Cape Town, Western Cape, South Africa, one of six children, of Saul Solomon (1817–1892) and Georgiana Margaret Solomon (née Thomson 1844–1933). Solomon's father was a newspaper proprietor and a liberal politician in the first Cape Parliament and her mother was an educator and suffragette. Daisy Solomon grew up in a household with reforming views, her father was known as a radical due to his support for multi-racial government contrary to the political views of many in power at the time. Her father was a supporter of women's rights, known for defending freedom of speech in the parliament and in the Cape Argus paper he owned, and had an original copy of Mary Wollestonecraft's Vindication of the Rights of Women in his library.

Solomon's mother had emigrated from Scotland to South Africa in 1873 to teach at a newly founded girls school which became the Good Hope Seminary, and married Saul Solomon, who was much older than her, on 27 March 1874; sadly their oldest daughter and her governess were drowned in an accident in 1881, before Daisy was born. Solomon had an elder brother, also Saul, who became a judge in the Supreme Court of South Africa; sister Margaret; brother George and brother William Ewart Gladstone Solomon, an artist who followed their mother into education as principal of Bombay School of Art, and also designed a WSPU banner. Solomon's mother, Georgiana campaigned in South Africa for the Women's Christian Temperance Movement, rising to be an international representative and later world vice-president, and later engaged in militant activism for women's suffrage in Britain and returned for a short time (1902) to support campaign for women in South Africa.

The Solomon family returned to Britain in 1888 due to father Saul's poor health; he died in Scotland in 1892. Daisy Solomon lived in Bedford, then Sidcup, before the family moved to West Hampstead.

== Political activism ==
Solomon and her mother joined the Women's Liberal Association but had decided by 1908 that this was not making adequate progress on women's right to vote, and they joined the militant suffragette organisation, the Women's Social and Political Union . The Solomons took part in a number of suffragette events during the WSPU's ongoing campaign; it organised protests and publicity stunts to get politicians' and the public's attention.

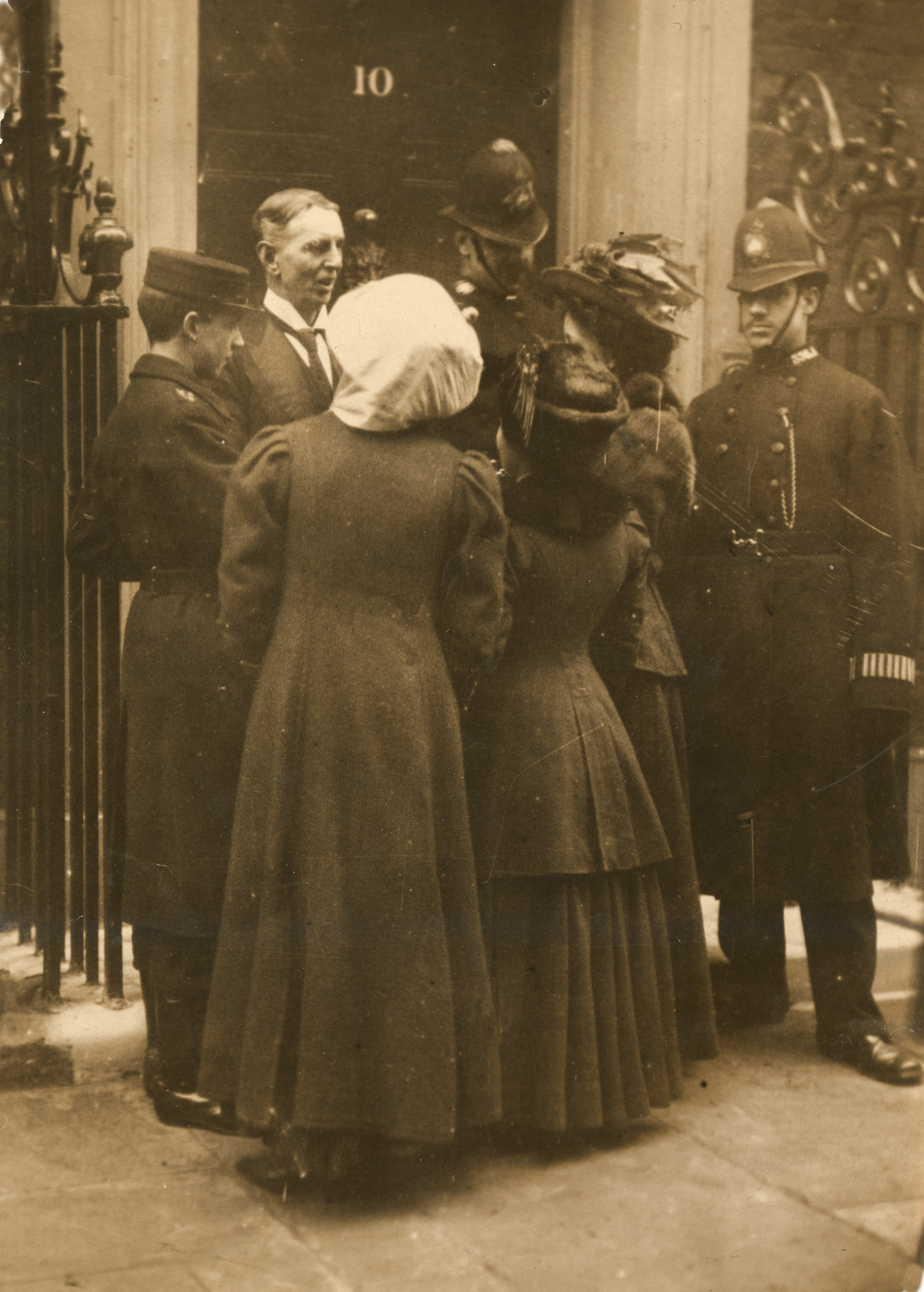
Daisy Solomon and Elspeth McLelland - human letters at 10 Downing Street 23 February 1909

On 23 February 1909, Jessie Kenney took Daisy Solomon and Elspeth McClelland to the Strand Post Office and paid three-pence to have them 'posted' to the Prime Minister at Number 10 Downing Street the day before the 'Women's Parliament' meeting in Caxton Hall. This made headline news in the Daily Mirror, whose reporter had been alerted. Solomon and McClelland got a rousing cheer on joining the Caxton Hall event. After that meeting a delegation including Solomon tried again to approach the Prime Minister, while he was dining out, and twenty-seven women were arrested with leader Emmeline Pethick-Lawrence. For Solomon and others like Constance Lytton, Caprina Fahey, Rose Lamartine Yates, and Sarah Carwin, this was their first arrest for activism. International attention was generated, with the Los Angeles Herald commenting on Solomon's and other protestor's 'high social position' and remarking that 'it is increasingly difficult to predict how their demands may be longer parried' and stating that the situation of these arrests and the perseverance of those fighting for the women's right to vote was becoming 'embarrassing' for the British government.

Constance Lytton quoted Solomon writing about the sparseness of the furniture in prison: 'a thin hard mattress, and an even thinner pillow' and conveyed in a brief statement the joy of finding a brush and comb in her book Prisons and Prisoners: some personal experiences. Solomon went on hunger strike and was force-fed. Despite this experience, Solomon said that she regarded her imprisonment as a 'baptism to work for the uplifting of womanhood'.

In 1906, Solomon was joint branch secretary of the WSPU Hampstead branch but resigned in 1913. Research by Elizabeth Crawford, suffrage researcher, during the 2019 COVID-19 lockdown has identified that in 1910, Solomon's brother William E. Gladstone Solomon's banner representing the new political equality of the sexes, with a man and woman and wording 'the old order changeth, giving place to new' for the North West London WPSU was unfurled at the branch premises, and Solomon may be one of the holder standing in the Kilburn Times image. The large banner was marched in the 'Prison to Citizenship' Procession on 17 June 1910. Votes for Women, the WSPU newsletter recommended the day this event before ‘Let no local women miss the chance of walking in the great Procession under Mr W. E. Gladstone Solomon’s most beautiful banner’.

By 1915, Solomon had however joined the Hampstead and Golders Green branch of the United Suffragists, as joint secretary and was in communication with other suffragists such as Charlotte Despard. In 1918, Solomon became literature secretary of the British Dominions' Women's Citizens Union, attending an international conference in Paris in 1923. Solomon continued to campaign for the extension of voting rights to be equal to men, including in 1926 as honorary secretary to the Equal Political Rights Campaign Committee. In 1928, Solomon took over as secretary of the British Commonwealth League, and explained the South African situation with their women doing a considerable amount of social and welfare work, but with no extended parliamentary enfranchisement, and no political party endorsing suffragism, although women could vote for local councils; there were a small number of women councillors and one female mayor, but she also explained the racial considerations there were hampering progress, and that British suffragists should sympathise and support. In 1932, she wrote to Phoebe Cusden about the arrangements being suspended for delegates spending time in Geneva at the League of Nations.

Solomon was in Britain in 1948, but returned to South Africa and was there in 1963, and died there in 1978.

== Legacy ==
Solomon was brought up in a family who believed in women's rights, and she donated to the Women's Service Library (now the Fawcett Library) including her father Saul Solomon's original copy of Mary Wollestonecraft's Vindication of the Rights of Women.

Solomon's own papers were donated to the South African library at Cape Town, now part of the National Library of South Africa.
