= Charles Lapworth (journalist) =

British-born socialist activist, journalist and film promoter

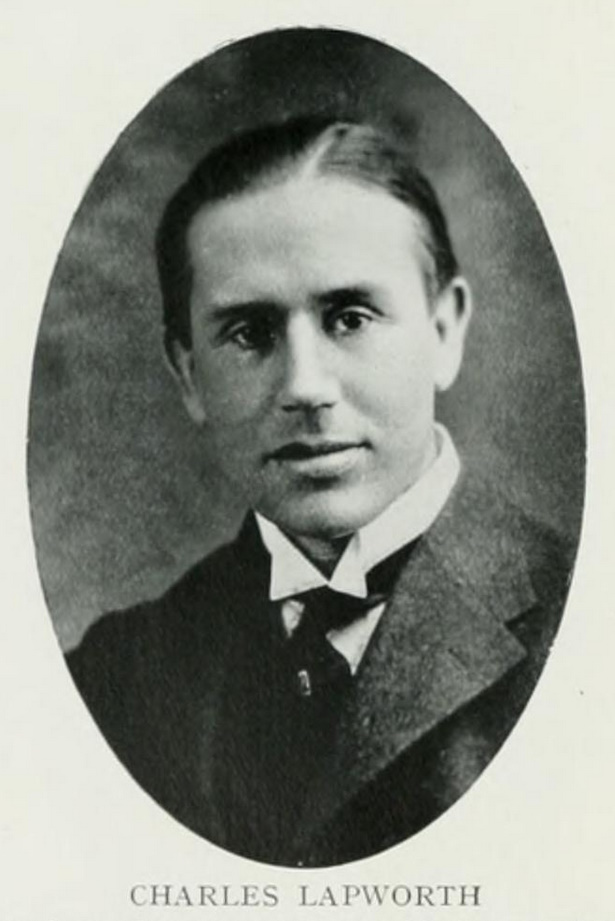
- Portrait of Charles Lapworth in about 1921.
- Born: Charles Lapworth; 13 June 1878; Willenhall, Staffordshire, England
- Died: 26 October 1951 (aged 73); Los Angeles, California, USA
- Occupations: Socialist activist, journalist, film promoter

Charles Lapworth (13 June 1878 – 26 October 1951) was a British-born socialist activist, journalist and film promoter.

In the years prior to World War I Lapworth was an activist in the cause of syndicalist socialism, supporting industrial unionism and the international solidarity of the labour movement. He was the editor of The Daily Herald from late 1912 to December 1913, during which the newspaper developed a radical voice supporting unionism, the suffragette movement and the class struggle. After a dispute regarding his editorial style he left the Herald and worked as an editor for the Daily Mail during the early months of the war. By early 1916 he had settled in Los Angeles with his family, where he edited the arts and culture magazine The Graphic.

From 1918 he became involved with the motion picture industry, working initially as a publicist for Charlie Chaplin. In 1920 he returned to England where he worked as the director of promotion and publicity for Goldwyn Pictures. He later served on the boards of Gainsborough Pictures and Whitehall Films in Britain. By 1930 Lapworth had returned to the Los Angeles area where he undertook various roles connected with the film and entertainment industry.

== Biography ==
=== Early years ===
Charles Lapworth was born on 13 June 1878 at Portobello in Willenhall, Staffordshire, the son of Isaac Lapworth and Mary Ann (née Parker). His father was a coal miner.

Lapworth received his early training as a journalist working for the Yorkshire Press newspaper.

=== Socialism ===
Lapworth travelled to the United States and accompanied Eugene V. Debs on his 'Red Special' railroad campaign in the lead-up to the 1908 presidential election. Debs was running for president as the candidate for the Socialist Party of America and Lapworth took on the role as a publicist for the campaign, as well as promoting the Industrial Workers of the World and speaking about socialism in Britain.

After he returned to Britain, Charles Lapworth and Else Minna Louise Fritz were married on 20 January 1909 at Pontefract in Yorkshire. The couple had two children, a son named Norman (born in 1913) and a daughter named Nikita (born in 1921).

Lapworth contested the seat of Sheffield Brightside, as a candidate for the Social Democratic Party, in the January 1910 general election. He was put in as a candidate at short notice after the previous candidate had stood down. The election was won by the Liberal Party candidate, with Lapworth receiving less than five percent of the vote.

By about 1911 Lapworth and his wife were living in Italy, investigating the socialist movement there; in his own words: "Mrs. Lapworth and I were leading the lives of tramps in Italy". Lapworth reported for London's Daily Mail newspaper, covering the Italo-Turkish War in the Ottoman province of Tripolitania Vilayet (northern modern Libya), fought between the Kingdom of Italy and the Ottoman Empire from September 1911 to October 1912. During the conflict Lapworth, in collaboration with Helen Zimmern, wrote Tripoli and the Young Italy, published in about August 1912. One reviewer described the book as "an ex parte statement, from the Italian standpoint, of Italy's claim to Tripoli", presenting "the reasons why Italy had the right to seize upon Tripoli". Italy's aggressive campaign was characterised as "the seizure of the territory of a friendly power in the midst of profound peace", another instance "of the application of the modern doctrine of might is right". A review of the book in The Nation commented that "one readily gains the impression that [Lapworth] is presenting a semi-official brief on behalf of the Italian Government".

=== The Daily Herald ===
After returning to England, in about September 1912 Lapworth was appointed as the editor of the Daily Herald, replacing Rowland Kenney. The Herald had been established in April 1912 as a permanent daily newspaper supportive of the labour movement, but independent of the Labour Party and the Trades Union Congress. In its previous incarnation it had been a daily strike bulletin during a period of considerable political upheaval in Britain, with Asquith's Liberal government challenging the powers of the House of Lords and organised agitation for female suffrage and industrial conflict leading to a large number of strikes.

Lapworth's appointment to the role of editor of the Herald was encouraged Charles Granville, a publisher who had promised to put four thousand pounds into the newspaper, during a period when its finances were particularly dire. Under Lapworth's editorship the pages of the Daily Herald became more sympathetic to a syndicalist agenda which emphasised the primacy of industrial workers within the structure of society. Strike action was encouraged as a means of enforcing solidarity amongst workers and controlling the means of production in the process of achieving a post-capitalist society. Lapworth himself has been described as "a committed syndicalist". Coinciding with Lapworth's appointment as editor was the recruitment of the Australian cartoonist Will Dyson, who was initially paid five pounds a week and given carte blanche to engage in the expression of his ideas. Dyson developed a dramatic visual language, often featuring symbolic representations of labour and capitalism. With Lapworth as editor new typefaces were introduced and Dyson's radical cartoons were given a full page and regularly featured. Industrial news in the Daily Herald was presented under the regular heading of "The War That Really Matters". The opinions published in the newspaper were "accompanied by a greater venom"; Lapworth and his colleagues "were not content to attack the system, but denounced everyone who compromised with it".

The Labour politician George Lansbury had assisted with the relaunch of the Herald in April 1912 and was the chairman of the journal's board of directors. In October 1912 he resigned from parliament in protest at the treatment of suffragettes and their imprisonment. By about mid-year 1913 Lansbury began to devote his attention to the Daily Herald. In June 1913 the company operating the newspaper, the Daily Herald Printing and Publishing Society Ltd., was forced into liquidation due to "a want of working capital". A new private company, The Limit Printing and Publishing Co., was then formed to run the newspaper, with Lansbury and Lapworth as directors. The expenditure was cut down to £500 a week, reducing the weekly production shortfall to £200, "which several anonymous rich friends of Mr. Lansbury guaranteed to make good". Francis Meynell, representing the anonymous benefactors, was added to the board of directors. Lansbury was a Christian socialist and disapproved of aspects of the editorial direction of the Herald. In October 1912, for example, he had publicly objected to the published description of the Labour MP Philip Snowden as a traitor to the labour movement.

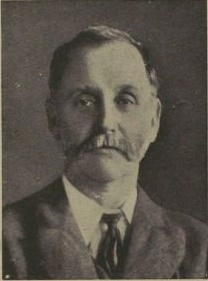
George Lansbury in about 1920.

On 1 December 1913 Lapworth was summoned to a meeting of the board members, held the following day and attended by Lansbury, Meynell and himself. Lansbury, who was on the eve of departing for a visit to the United States, began by asking Lapworth to resign from the position of editor, adding: "Either you go out, or I shall refuse to have anything more to do with the paper". Lansbury explained that the reason for his request was "a fundamental difference between his own frame of mind" and Lapworth's. He expressed that he wanted the newspaper "to stand for the class war, but not class hatred and attacks on persons of another class", adding: "Hatred of conditions, by all means, but not of persons". Lapworth's reading of Lansbury's words was that the Herald was to be allowed to retain its 'kick', "but it must have a feather-bed tied round its foot". He, as the editor of "a militant working-class paper", was being "taken to task for uncomplimentary references to a duchess, to a bishop, to a prominent Fabian, and for a cartoon of a certain Labour member of Parliament". Lapworth refused to resign, after which Meynell moved that Lansbury be appointed editor in his place. Lapworth voted against the proposition and Lansbury, as chairman, "used his casting vote and declared himself appointed editor". Lapworth, as a "graceful concession" to Lansbury, then formally resigned and left the office. Lapworth attempted to have his written account of the meeting published in the Daily Herald, but it was declined by the new management. His account was published in the 'letters to the editor' pages of The New Age of 18 December 1913. In The New Age of 1 January 1914 letters in support of Lapworth were published, as well as letters from the management committee of the Herald and Francis Meynell claiming that Lapworth's account of the December meeting was inaccurate. Lansbury did not exercise day-to-day editorial control of the Herald until February 1914, after he returned from the United States.

In The New Age of 26 February 1914 a letter from Lansbury was published in which he maintained that Lapworth had been dismissed as editor, but the word "resignation" had been used "in honourable conformity with our understanding with Mr. Lapworth". In answer to accusations that Lapworth "was bribed to leave the country", Lansbury claimed that Lapworth had "volunteered the statement" that he intended "to go abroad at once, as he did not want to stay in England under the circumstances". Lapworth received remuneration of £300 (six months' salary) in lieu of notice and, as stated by Lansbury, "our friends" voluntarily added a further £200 "for his additional expenses and for the anxieties and difficulties that any man must have who feels that it is necessary for him to leave the country". Lapworth answered Lansbury's letter in The New Age of 5 March 1914. In regard to the meeting in December 1913, he remarked: "So completely had the conspirators prepared their plot, that immediately I conceded my 'resignation,' the question of compensation was broached". He added: "I'm afraid I said some bitter things about the indecent haste". In regard to Lansbury's comments about him leaving the country, Lapworth explained that he had made an incidental remark that he might get work abroad "as I felt I could not see a 'Daily Herald' that was not my 'Daily Herald'". He maintained that his "casual sentimental remark... was subsequently taken advantage of, and financial pressure was brought to bear upon me to go abroad at once". Lapworth concluded his letter: "And so I was forced to abdicate, because, as Mr. Meynell put it with sweetly becoming embarrassment, 'we want the paper to represent Mr. Lanbury's ideas'".

After leaving the Herald Lapworth worked as the night news editor of London's Daily Mail newspaper, owned by Lord Northcliffe. He was there during the early months of World War I, including during the early German airship bombing raids that began in about January 1915. In May 1915 the Daily Mail published criticism of Lord Kitchener, the Secretary of State for War, for not supplying enough munitions to the army in France. Lapworth later recalled: "When the first editorial came up from the composing room and we read it in the office, we felt quite confident that the whole staff would be hauled off to prison, or possibly stood up against a wall and shot".

=== The Graphic ===
In about late 1915 Lapworth travelled to the United States with his family, where they eventually made their way to Los Angeles. In July 1916 Albert Porter purchased The Graphic, a Los Angeles-based arts and culture magazine. Porter was a wealthy retired ex-New York publisher, living at Pasadena. After purchasing The Graphic he hired Lapworth as editor. Lapworth's work on the magazine demonstrated the sort of care and attention to quality that enabled Porter's proprietorship to remain essentially hands-off. The editorial content of The Graphic generally avoided overt political comment, but Lapworth's concerns about the war in Europe led to his opposition to isolationism and his advocacy of the involvement of the United States in the conflict, manifested by cartoons in the magazine denouncing German barbarism and supporting American interventionism. When the United States entered the war in April 1917 Lapworth wrote an editorial asking his readers to "take the war seriously".

In 1917 Porter decided to sell The Graphic and extended a three-month option to his editor to purchase the magazine. It is likely that Lapworth lacked the funds to buy the publication outright, but was enabled to purchase The Graphic by entering into a partnership with Eldridge Rand, a friend he had known in London before the war. Rand was from a wealthy Californian family. In 1910 in Lisbon he had married Lucille Gage, the daughter of Henry T. Gage (who was then serving in the role of ambassador to Portugal). The newly-weds lived in Florence (where Rand may have first met Lapworth), and afterwards moved to London (during Lapworth's stint as editor of the Daily Herald). Lapworth and Rand became co-owners of The Graphic from June 1917, with Rand providing most, and possibly all, of the funding to buy the magazine.

There was a distinct change in the style of The Graphic after Rand and Lapworth took charge, with a greater coverage of the arts and society with a similarity to East Coast magazines such as The Saturday Evening Post and Town & Country. Any political comment was more akin to satire or irony than analysis or critique. The impetus for the changes have been attributed to Rand, especially evidenced by the fact that Lapworth departed from the partnership in about September 1917. By late-September 1917 Lapworth's name had disappeared from the pages of The Graphic, probably indicating that he had sold whatever stake he may have had in the magazine to Rand.

=== The film industry ===
In the 1918 Los Angeles City Directory Lapworth was listed as an employee of Chaplin Studios. In 1918 Lapworth interviewed Charlie Chaplin and stayed on as a writer and consultant on A Dog's Life, released in April 1918. The film was about a homeless tramp and his dog, outwitting the police after stealing sausages and ultimately winning the affection of a dance-hall singer. The plot involved social commentary covering themes of poverty, hunger, the "hostility of police towards the poor and the victimisation of women by their reduced circumstances". After the completion of A Dog's Life Lapworth joined Chaplin as he travelled through the southern states of America during April 1918 on a Liberty Bond tour, urging the buying of war bonds. The tour ended in New York City in front of the United States Sub-Treasury Building with Chaplin, and Douglas Fairbanks and Mary Pickford (who had been touring the north-east states), entertaining a large crowd.

In about 1919 Lapworth and Ridley Wells, a journalist and poet, co-owned the Rye Courier, a small newspaper based in Rye, New York. They attempted to conduct the local newspaper as a literary journal. In the words of a local historian: "They were talented and ran some quite delightful articles in the Courier", but they were also "impractical and could not sustain the enterprise". Lapworth probably returned to the West Coast after selling the Rye Courier, but returned to Britain by 1920.

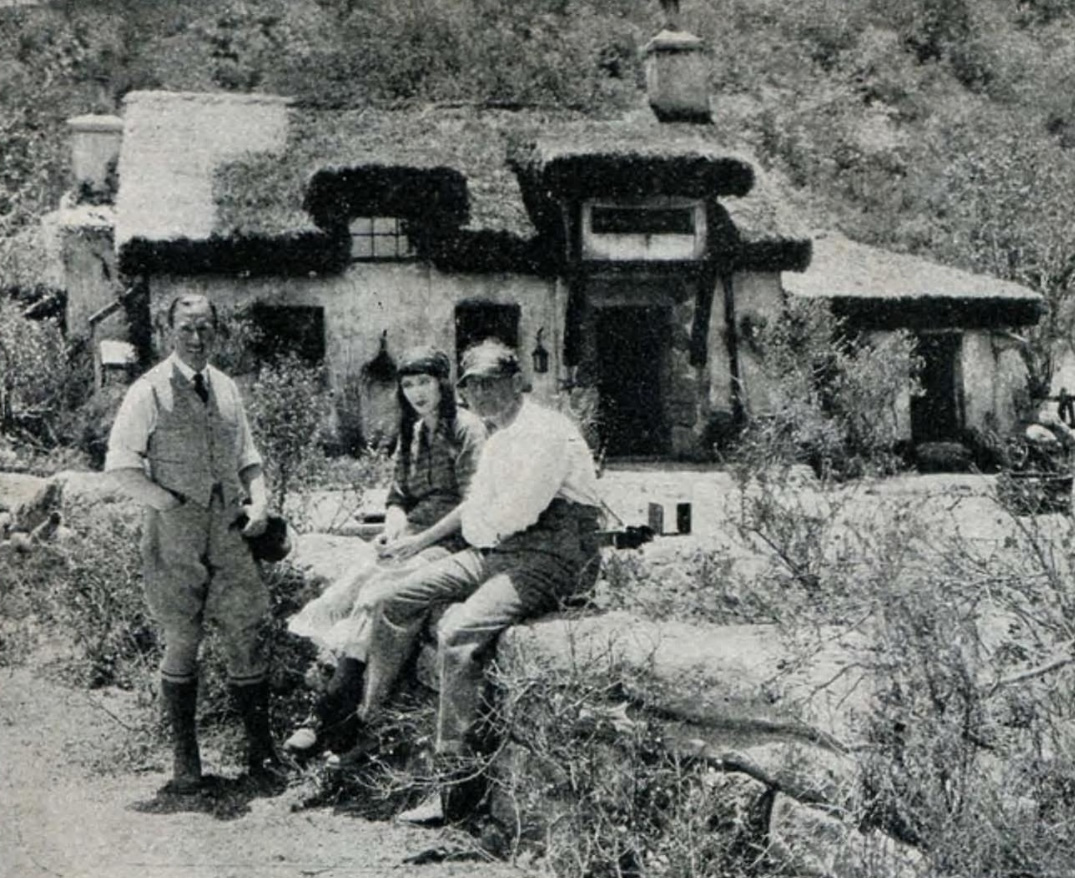
Lapworth on the set of The Master of Man in 1923, with the leading woman Mae Busch and the director Victor Seastrom.

By about April 1920 Lapworth had joined the board of Goldwyn Ltd., the English branch of Goldwyn Pictures Corporation, and was appointed to the executive position of secretary and director of promotion and publicity. The company's London offices were located in Little Newport Street. In April 1923 it was reported that he was returning to America "to do special work" at the Goldwyn organisation's Culver City studio in California. In Culver City Lapworth was associated with the film directors Victor Seastrom and Donald Crisp. In about October 1923 Lapworth worked as the technical advisor on the film adaptation of Hall Caine's The Master of Man (released as Name the Man, directed by Seastrom, in January 1924). In December 1923 Lapworth resigned from the Goldwyn company. Interviewed in New York on his way to England, he said that "his plans are at the moment indefinite" though he might possibly "take up production on his own".

In September 1925 in England Lapworth accepted an offer to join the board of Gainsborough Pictures Ltd, where he worked as a production manager and was associated with the early films of the producer Michael Balcon. He also wrote film scripts for the company. In November 1925 it was reported that Gainsborough Pictures had signed Alfred Hitchcock to direct his second film called Fear o'God, based on an original story by Lapworth. The film was released as The Mountain Eagle in October 1926, with Lapworth credited as a co-writer. Lapworth was also a writer, together with the director Graham Cutts, on the production of The Cabaret Kid (also known as The Sea Urchin), released in November 1926. Lapworth resigned from Gainsborough Pictures in July 1926.

Lapworth was employed as the production manager for the Société Générale des Films, producers of La Passion de Jeanne d'Arc, released in France in October 1926.

Lapworth was on the board of directors of Whitehall Films Ltd., in the position of distribution manager. The company was floated to the public in November 1927. Whitehall Films built a studio at Elstree in Hertfordshire, completed by about May 1928. In July 1928 it was reported that Whitehall Films had acquired three French films, The Passion of Joan of Arc, Gentlemen at Arms and Baccarat, for distribution in Britain. The company had also completed its first production, Juan Jose. After having paid seven thousand dollars for Joan of Arc, the film was banned by the British censor for its depiction of tormenting English soldiers prior to Joan's execution. The share float had raised "£168,000 from the British public on the strength of Government 'protection' of the British film industry", but by early 1929 Whitehall Films was showing a substantial loss. In May 1928 the general business manager, Norman Pogson, resigned from the board of Whitehall Films and Lapworth resigned soon afterwards. By December 1930 bankruptcy proceedings had commenced against the company.

=== Later years ===
In 1930 Lapworth was living at Calabasas, in the San Fernando Valley north-west of downtown Los Angeles. In December 1930 he was referred to as an editor of Film Quarterly.

In July 1937 it was reported that Lapworth was working on-air for the Los Angeles radio station KFI. On Monday afternoons in a segment called "What the Papers Say" he presented a digest of the news of the week; on Thursdays he presented "What the Critics Say", a coverage of motion pictures, theatre and radio.

In 1942, Lapworth launched the short-lived weekly Malibu Bugle, the first newspaper in the city.

In 1947 Lapworth was working as the public relations representative for Loew's International studio.

Charles Lapworth died on 26 October 1951 in Los Angeles, California, aged 73.

== Publications ==
- 'The Tour of the Red Special', The International Socialist Review, December 1908, Vol. IX No. 6, pages 401-415.
- Charles Lapworth & Helen Zimmern (1912), Tripoli and Young Italy, London: Stephen Swift & Co. Ltd. (also published in Italy as Tripoli e la Nuova Italia by Nivola Zenichelli of Bologna).
- 'The Movement in Other Countries' (supplementary chapter by Charles Lapworth); (in) Robert Hunter (1912), Socialists at Work, New York: The Macmillan Company.
- Self Determination for California (1919), San Francisco: W.N. Brunt Press; "reprinted from The Bulletin, San Francisco".

Media offices
Preceded by Rowland Kenney	Editor of the Daily Herald; 1912–1913	Succeeded by George Lansbury
