= The Cabaret Kid =

1926 film

- Directed by: Graham Cutts
- Written by: Graham Cutts; Charles Lapworth
- Produced by: Michael Balcon
- Starring: Betty Balfour; George Hackathorne; Haidee Wright
- Production company: Gainsborough Pictures
- Distributed by: Woolf & Freedman Film Service
- Release date: 31 January 1926
- Running time: 86 minutes
- Country: United Kingdom
- Language: English

The Cabaret Kid is a 1926 British romance and drama film directed by Graham Cutts and starring Betty Balfour, George Hackathorne and W. Cronin Wilson. It was made at Gainsborough Studios with Michael Balcon as producer. The film, also known as The Sea Urchin, was released as The Cabaret Kid in November 1926.

The film was set in both England and France. The plot was summarised in a review in Photoplay Magazine as: "An enmity of long standing between two aristocratic English families is straightened out through the association of the younger generation". The young lady of one family (Fay Wynchbeck, played by Betty Balfour) accidentally meets a young man from the other family (Jack Trebarrow, an aviator, played by George Hackathorne) in a Paris nightclub. The review of the film concluded: "The development of their love affair will interest you, but the story is disconnected".

== Cast ==
- Betty Balfour - Fay Wynchbeck
- George Hackathorne - Jack Trebarrow
- W. Cronin Wilson - Rivoli
- Haidee Wright - Minnie Wynchbeck
- Connie Brand - stage actress
- Marie Wright - Mary Wynchbeck
- Cecil Morton York - Sir Trevor Trebarrow
- Clifford Heatherley - Sullivan
- A. G. Poulton - Janitor
