= Caprina Fahey =

British suffragette

- Born: Charlotte Emily Caprina Gilbert; 13 September 1883; Capri, Italy
- Died: 26 October 1959 (aged 76); Norfolk, England
- Other names: Emily Charlton; Charlotte Hay
- Known for: Suffragette, Hunger Strike Medal
- Spouse: Alfred Edward Fahey (m. 1901; died 1907)
- Children: Dennis Mountiford Fahey
- Father: Alfred Gilbert

Caprina Fahey (née Gilbert; 13 September 1883 – 26 October 1959) was a British suffragette who was given the Women's Social and Political Union (WSPU) Hunger Strike Medal "for Valour" in 1914. She was an active member of the WSPU and was imprisoned twice in Holloway Prison. In 2017, the Norfolk Museums Service made a successful appeal for information about her life.

Fahey was born in Capri, Italy and was the daughter of sculptor Alfred Gilbert. Growing up she lived in Italy, Belgium and England. She married twice, divorcing her first husband and retaining custody of their child, which was unusual at the time. Trained as a masseuse, she served with the French Red Cross in World War I. She then qualified as a midwife, later moving to Hainford in Norfolk, where she lived with her second husband until her death in 1959.

== Early life and family ==
Caprina Fahey was born Charlotte Emily Caprina Gilbert in Capri, Italy, on 13 September 1883. She was the youngest of five children. Her mother was Alice Jane Gilbert (1847–1916) and her father was Alfred Gilbert (1854–1934), sculptor of the Shaftesbury Memorial Fountain in Piccadilly Circus, London. Among his other works, he also created the memorial to Henry Fawcett in Westminster Abbey, Fawcett having been married to Dame Millicent Garrett Fawcett leader of the National Union of Women's Suffrage Societies (NUWSS). Her parents were cousins and eloped to Paris in order to be married. From France they moved to Italy, before returning to England as Gilbert pursued his career. His bankruptcy in 1901 forced the family to move to Bruges and then later to return to England again. Fahey travelled by train to Belgium with her mother on 7 September 1901.

Fahey would occasionally model for her father. He disapproved of her later activism as a suffragette, commenting in a letter in 1909 "Cappie a thumper of drums or a 'tootler' on Flutes and a banner waver in a rotten Cause!!!!" He later left her out of his will, although she did attend his funeral at Golders Green Crematorium.

== Career ==
Fahey trained as a masseuse and married Alfred Edward Fahey in 1901, taking his name. Her husband was one of her father's assistants and a painter. Together they had a son called Dennis Mountiford Fahey in 1905, but Alfred then left her when the boy was six months old. She later sued Alfred for divorce and was given custody of Dennis; this was unusual for the times. Her husband died soon afterwards in 1907 and their son died at the age of 35 in Brighton, leaving his mother three grandchildren in Sussex.

Fahey served with the French Red Cross as a masseuse during World War I, where she is thought to have met her second husband Edward Knight. Returning to Britain, she then trained as a midwife, qualifying in May 1917, and participated in the Women's Institute. Fahey and Knight moved to Rose Cottage, in Hainford, Norfolk during World War II. Fahey worked as an Air Raid Warden and they hosted at least one evacuee in wartime. They remained living there until Fahey's death.

== Suffragette activism ==
From the mid-1900s onwards, Fahey became an active member of the Women's Social and Political Union (WPSU), took part in suffragette activism and appears on the Suffragette Roll of Honour recording those who served prison sentences for the cause. She joined the WSPU in 1908, and within two years became organiser for Middlesex. At the time she was living with Vera Wentworth in London. Fahey also helped at Longdown Farm, organising suffragette meetings in central Buckinghamshire, where she stayed in the summers of 1908 and 1909.

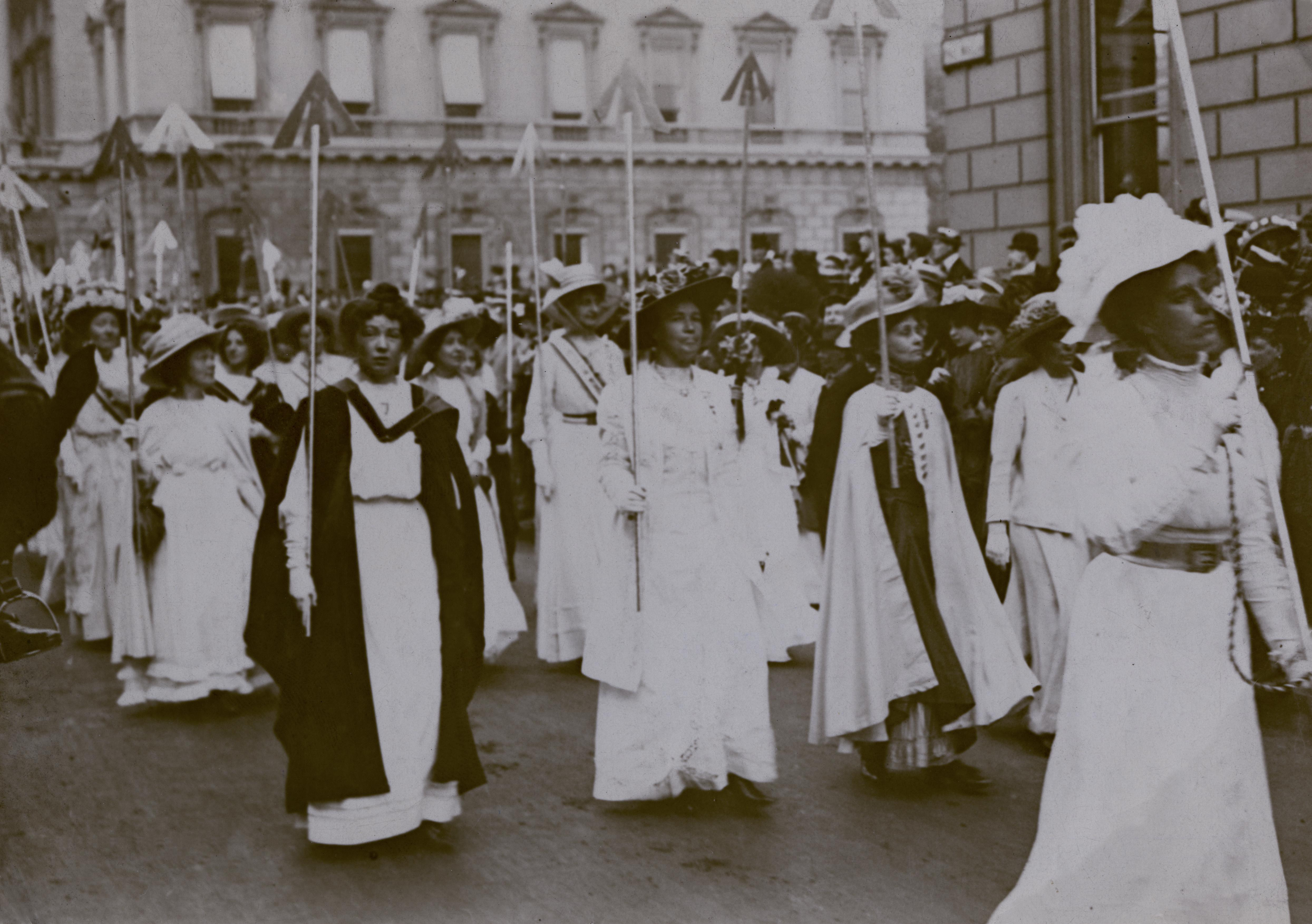
Suffragette prisoners procession, 1909

Fahey was arrested in 1909, along with twenty six other suffragette campaigners who marched from Caxton Hall, Westminster and attempted to enter the House of Commons. She was sentenced for obstruction with Constance Lytton, Daisy Solomon, Rose Lamartine Yates and Sarah Carwin, receiving one month in prison. In November 1910, she was involved in the incident known as Black Friday and arrested again for stone-throwing, being sentenced to two weeks. Both Fahey's sentences were served in Holloway Prison, where she went on hunger strike.

Fahey associated with local Norfolk suffragettes including Princess Sophia Alexandra Duleep Singh, Grace Marcon and Miriam Pratt. Fahey was imprisoned with Helen Watts and wrote praising her subsequent 90 hour fast in prison. By 1913, Fahey was asked to be a 'captain', leading one of twenty two groups of suffragette mourners along with Leonora Tyson, Elsa Myers, Eleanor Glidewell, and Dorothea Rock at the funeral procession of Emily Davison.

Caprina Fahey was awarded the WSPU Hunger Strike Medal "for Valour" dated 14 March 1914 when she was arrested under the name Emily Charlton. and also used the name 'Charlotte Hay', Her medal also refers to the date 21 May 1914. It is now held in the Norfolk Museums Service (NMS) archive having been donated by her husband following her death.

== Death and legacy ==
Fahey died at the Norfolk and Norwich Hospital on 26 October 1959. Her funeral took place at the All Saints Church in Hainford on 29 October 1959. The Rose Cottage where she had lived became derelict and was eventually demolished in 1975. Some artefacts relating to Fahey's Votes for Women campaigning were recovered. Her legacy as a suffragette was not mentioned in her death notice, but her time in the Red Cross, as a state registered midwife and as an Air Raid ARP Warden and membership of the Women's Institute were recorded.

In November 2017, the Norfolk Museums Service put out a public call for information on Fahey's life and legacy. The appeal led to more information about her life and a suffragette certificate given to her is now held in the museum. Fahey was also nominated for the Suffrage to Citizenship project organised by the Women's Local Government Society. In 2019, her medal was on display at a Quilters Guild event at Norwich Castle.
