= Helen Zimmern =

German-born British writer (1846–1934)

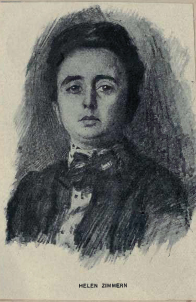
- Helen Zimmern
- Born: 25 March 1846; Hamburg, Germany
- Died: 11 January 1934 (aged 87); Florence, Italy
- Citizenship: United Kingdom
- Occupation: Author

Helen Zimmern (25 March 1846 – 11 January 1934) was a German-born British writer and translator. She was instrumental in making European culture more accessible in English.

== Biography ==
Zimmern and her parents emigrated in 1850 to Britain, where her father became a Nottingham lace merchant. She was naturalised on coming of age, as one of the three daughters of the merchant Hermann Theodore Zimmern and his wife Antonia Marie Therese Regina Zimmern. Her sister was the suffragist Alice Zimmern; the political scientist Alfred Eckhard Zimmern was a cousin.

The family moved to London in 1856. Her first appearance in print was a story for Once a Week. She was soon writing for the Argosy and other magazines. A series of children's stories first published 1869–71 in Good Words for the Young was reprinted as Stories in Precious Stones (1873) and followed by another collection, Told by the Waves. A series of tales from the Edda appeared in Old Merry's Monthly in 1872 before being republished.

In 1873 Zimmern began writing critical articles, particularly on German literature, for the Examiner. She also wrote for Fraser's Magazine, Blackwood's Magazine, the Athenaeum, the Spectator, St James's, Pall Mall Magazine, the World of Art, the Italian La Rassegna Settimanale and various German papers. Her advocacy and translations made European culture – whether of Germany, or increasingly Italy – accessible to English readers. She lectured on Italian art in Britain and Germany, and translated Italian drama, fiction and history.

She befriended Friedrich Nietzsche, two of whose books she would later translate, after meeting him in Sils Maria, Switzerland, in the summer of 1886. Zimmern published her memories of Nietzsche in an anonymous article, entitled "Memories of N", and she was the first person to translate Beyond Good and Evil into English. Nietzsche selected her for the task, and in a letter to Peter Gast (Heinrich Köselitz) in December 1888, he discusses her suitability for the role, based on her reputation of being the first translator to introduce the British nation to Schopenhauer, noting favourably also Zimmern's friendship with Georg Brandes, the Danish critic and scholar who greatly influenced Scandinavian and European literature. Nietzsche's high regard for Zimmern as an intellectual, communicated to Peter Gast in their correspondence, was later translated by Anthony Ludovici in the Selected Letters of Friedrich Nietzsche.

By the end of the decade she had settled in Florence, where she was associated with the Corriere della Sera and also edited the Florence Gazette. In later life she defended Italian values against what she saw as the threat of German expansionism.

== Works ==
=== Books ===
- Stories in Precious Stones, Henry S. King & Co, 1873
- Arthur Schopenhauer, his Life and his Philosophy, 1876
- Gotthold Ephraim Lessing, his Life and his Works, 1878
- Maria Edgeworth , London : W.H. Allen, 1883
- The Story Of The Nations. The Hansa Towns, London, T. Fisher Unwin, 1889
- (ed.) The Discourses of Joshua Reynolds, 1887.
- Tales from the Edda
- Sir Lawrence Alma Tadema, London, George Bell & Sons, 1902
- The Italy of the Italians', 1906
- Tripoli and Young Italy, 1912 with Charles Lapworth (journalist)
- Italian Leaders of Today, London, Williams & Norgate, 1915
- The New Italy, 1918

=== Translations ===
- Lessing, Gotthold Ephraim, Selected Prose Works of G.E. Lessing, Ed. Edward Bell, Transl. by Helen Zimmer & E.C. Beasley, London, George Bell & Sons, 1879
- Half-Hours with Foreign Novelists, 1880 (sections of various novels, with her sister Alice Zimmern)
- Ferdowsi, Shahnameh (The Epic of Kings), 1883, Iran Chamber Society, MIT
- Carmen, Sylva, Pilgrim sorrow : a cycle of tales, New York, Henry Holt & Co, 1884
- Goldoni, Carlo, The Comedies of Carlo Goldoni, edited with an introduction by Helen Zimmern, London, David Stott, 1892
- Lewes, Louis, The women of Shakespeare, New York, Putnam's & Ldon, Hodder, 1895
- Nietzsche, Beyond Good and Evil, T. N. Foulis, 1906
- Nietzsche, Human, All Too Human, T. N. Foulis, 1909
- Cesare, Raffaele de, The last days of Papal Rome, 1850–1870, London, Constable, 1909
- Lessing, Gotthold Ephraim, Laokoon, and How the ancients represented death, with Beasley, Edward Calvert, London, 1914
