= Sarah Carwin =

British suffragette

- Born: Sarah Jane Carwin; 1863
- Died: 1933 (aged 69–70)
- Organization: Women's Social and Political Union
- Known for: Suffragette, Nurse and Feminist
- Awards: Hunger Strike Medal for Valour

Sarah Jane Carwin (1863–1933) was a British suffragette, feminist and nurse.

== Life and activism ==
Born Sarah Jane Carwin in 1863 in Bolton, Lancashire, her family moved to Russia for a period of her childhood.

In 1890, returned to England, Carwin joined the Methodist Sisterhood of West London Mission, where Emmeline Pethick-Lawrence had also been a volunteer (although it is not known if they met there) working with seasonal garment trade female workers. Within a year, Carwin had set up a workers cooperative in dressmaking to give such women an opportunity to have security and continuity of income outside the fashion season. She completed training as a nurse at Great Ormond Street children's hospital in 1896. Carwin also worked as a private nurse and travelled with a child to Ecuador and also revisited Russia several times.

By 1901, Carwin was running a home for about twelve illegitimate babies in Caterham.

Carwin said she was interested in feminism, influenced by reading Olive Schreiner, and 'when the suffragette movement began to be known, it strongly appealed to her. She had never taken part in politics or interested herself much in them; but here was an adventure, a crusade against injustice, an ideal to be served.'

Carwin was arrested with Constance Lytton, Caprina Fahey, Rose Lamartine Yates, Daisy Solomon and over 20 others in 1909, in her case her prison citation was for breaking windows. Carwin was sentenced with Ada Wright to one month, and broke all the cell windows in protest. They were brought before Holloway Prison Board, twenty men all seated, and made to stand. Carwin objected that men sat whilst women stood, and chairs were provided. Both were moved to damp basement cells for insubordination. Carwin and Wright went on hunger strike and were released after six days.

Later Emmeline Pankhurst sent Carwin a specially designed gold and flint 'stone thrower's badge' noting ' This is in memory of the flinty message you sent through the Government windows on 29 June'.

In 1911, Emily Davison wrote to 'dear comrade' Capper about her own arrest and expressed surprise and delight at her bail being set so high (£1000) that it 'is a grand advertisement for the Cause, isn't it?'.

During the 1911 Census, Carwin refused to give details of herself or the woman who shared the address at 11 Tavistock Mansions, London WC.

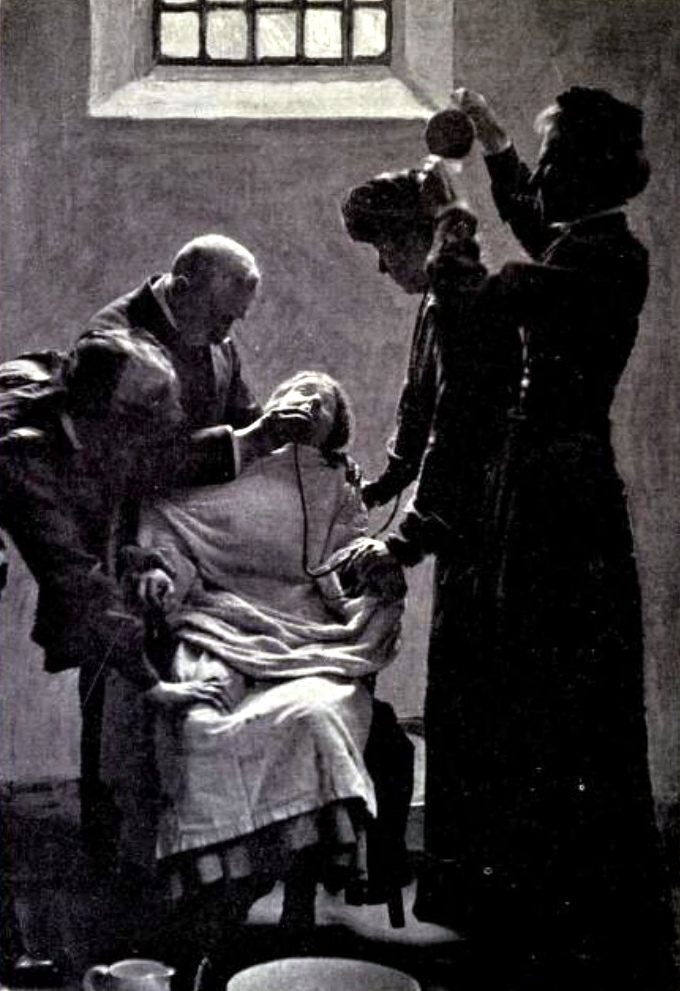
Force feeding of women hunger strikers

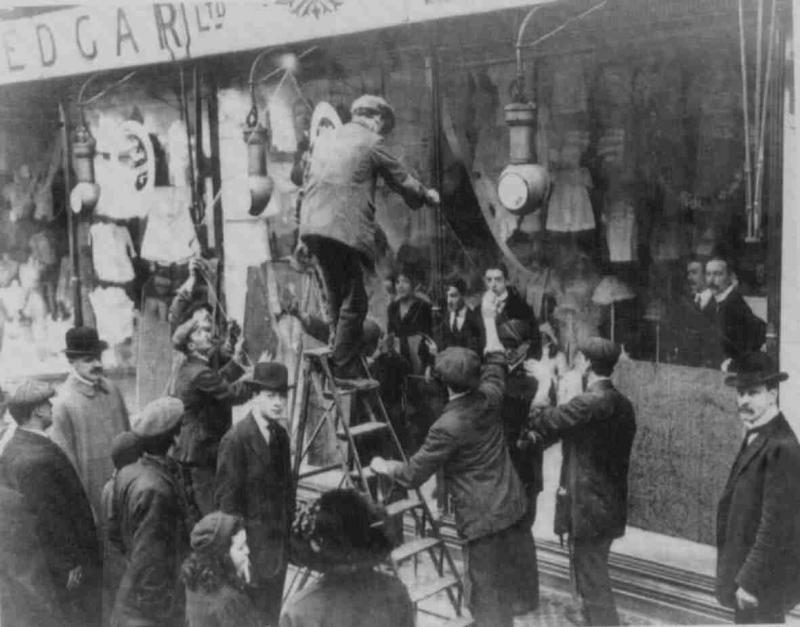
Suffragette window smashing campaign

In 1912, Carwin had her fourth and last arrest again for window breaking, causing £100 of damage to royal warrant J.C.Vickery, jewellers and dressmakers. Carwin was sentenced to six months with hard labour in Winson Green Prison. Again she went on hunger strike and was force fed, but 'resisted with her utmost strength'. This made her so ill that she was released after serving four months.

Carwin did no further militant activities.

== Later life and legacy ==
Carwin moved to the country for many years with a female friend to whom she was 'devotedly attached' until her friend died. Carwin then lived in the South of France and Italy.

She returned to England living in 3 The Crescent, Sandgate Kent, England, and died in 1933.

Her biographer Frances Mabelle Unwin said that close to her death Carwin had expressed a desire to live that part of her life again if given a choice: 'the part she had devoted to the suffrage. It had seemed the most worthwhile'

Carwin left her property in Letchworth to a niece as a requirement in her will was that it should only pass to a female relative on her mother's side (in line with her feminist views).
