= Emilie Solomon =

Pioneer of women's rights

Emilie Solomon (1859–1939) was a British supporter of women's suffrage and president of the Cape Woman's Christian Temperance Union (WCTU; 1919–1925) and was vice-president of the World WCTU (1925–1931). She was also involved in the Young Women's Christian Association (YWCA) and the Salvation Army. She was the first female chair of the Congregational Union, elected in 1937.

She was born in the town of Bedford, Cape Colony (modern-day South Africa) in 1858. Her father was Edward Solomon, a reverend of the Free Church in Southern Africa who worked for the London Missionary Society. Despite this, the Solomons have been described as "of the Jewish faith by descent, tradition and observance". She was the youngest of eight children; her three brothers were Edward Philip Solomon, Richard Solomon, and another who was Chief Justice of the Union of South Africa. Her mother was Jessie née Matthews, and her uncle was the politician Saul Solomon.

== See also ==
- Georgiana Solomon
