= Elspeth Douglas McClelland =

English suffragette

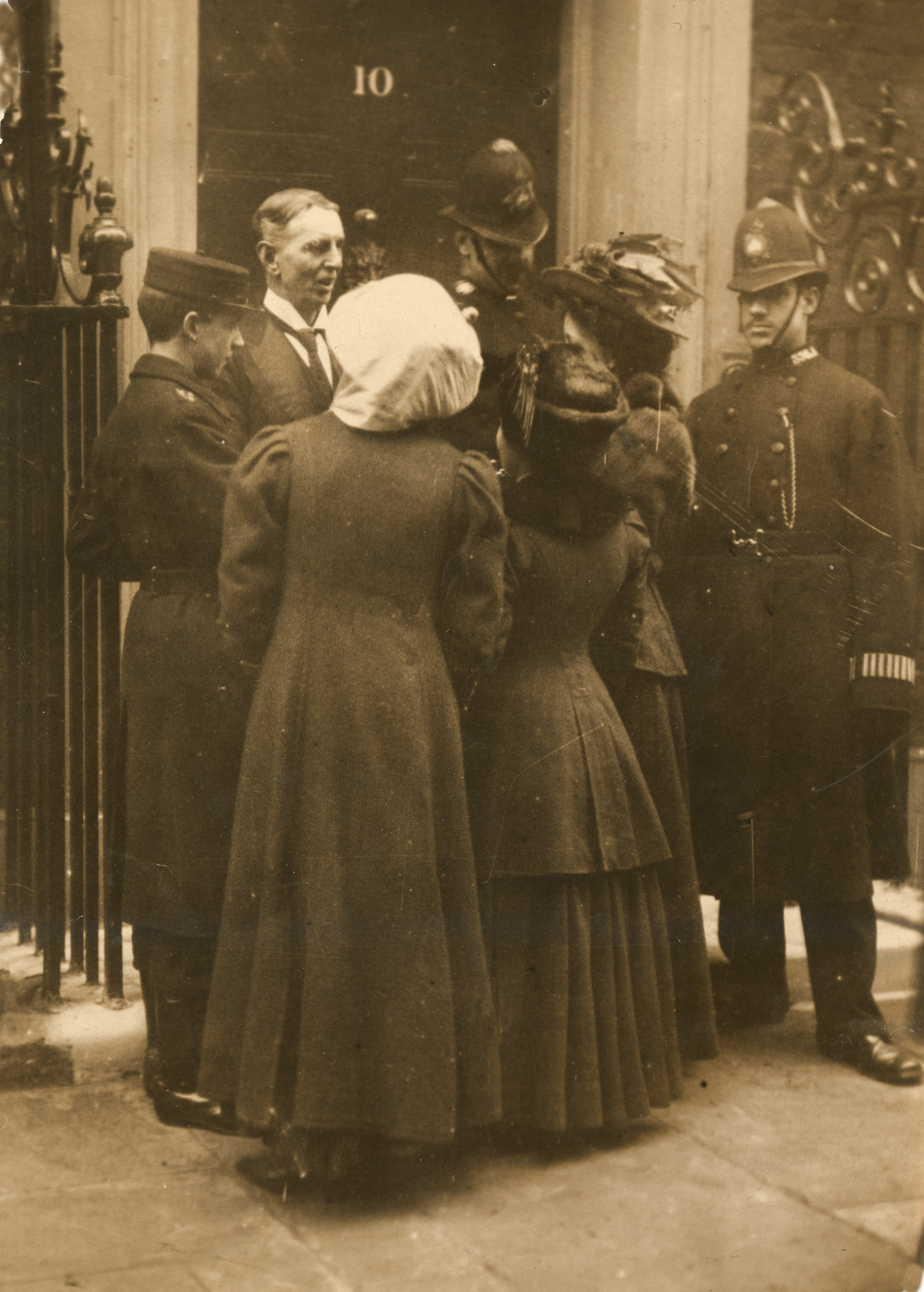
Daisy Solomon and Elspeth McClelland with a post boy, police and an official outside 10 Downing Street, attempting to get themselves delivered as letters

Elspeth Douglas McClelland, Mrs Spencer (1879–1920) was an English suffragette and architect. She is known for being a "human letter" sent by the suffragettes to the Prime Minister.

== Life ==
Elspeth Douglas McClelland was born on 20 May 1879 in Keighley, Yorkshire to John McClelland, an accountant, and Epsey McClelland (née Robinson). She was baptised in Ilkley on 19 July the same year. She trained as an architect, the only female student among 600 men at the Polytechnic Architectural School in London.

Architectural drawings show that she was working as an architect by 1904. She became a suffragette in the 1900s, married William Albert Spencer in 1912 and moved to Whitchurch Lane, Edgware. Elspeth had three children before dying in childbirth in 1920.

== Suffragette ==
McClelland's time as a suffragette is best known for when she was sent as a "human letter" to the Prime Minister, H. H. Asquith, on 23 February 1909. At this time Post Office regulations had been relaxed to allow individuals to be "posted" by express messenger, so McClelland and fellow suffragette Daisy Solomon were dispatched by Jessie Kenney and "Christabel Pankhurst from Clement's Inn and were taken by Mrs. Drummond to the East Strand Post Office". Daisy Dorothea Solomon was from South Africa and she was the daughter of another suffragette Georgiana Solomon.

They were addressed to "The Right Hon H. H. Asquith, 10 Downing Street, SW". For the price of a threepenny stamp, A.S. Palmer, a telegraph messenger boy, delivered them to Downing Street, where the policemen on duty allowed them through to number 10. At that point, an official came out and "notwithstanding the ladies' protest that they had been 'paid for', said 'you cannot be delivered here. You must be returned; you are dead letters'". Elspeth and Daisy were returned to the offices of the Women's Social and Political Union. The Prime Minister was said to have been "amused" by the incident. The front-page photo from the Daily Mirror can be seen on The British Postal Museum & Archive website.

In September 1913, Mrs Elspeth Spencer placed a classified ad in the suffragette newspaper Votes for Women (p. 732) describing herself: "Architect of uncommon houses and cottages. Furniture and decorations in suffrage colours designed and executed. Apply Studio A, 22 Blomfield Road, Kensington."

== Architect ==
There are conflicting reports about Elspeth's time as an architect. According to Atkinson, "McClelland had been the only woman among 600 male students at the Polytechnic Architectural School in London, and became the first woman to practice as an architect". However, records at the Royal Institute of British Architects (RIBA) indicate that its first female member was Ethel Mary Charles in 1898, when Elspeth would have been 19. The Polytechnic Architectural School has been absorbed into the University of Westminster. They do not have complete records for the likely dates of Elspeth's study. What they do show is Elspeth passing a Senior Commercial Education Certificate in book-keeping in the London Chamber of Commerce Examinations, 1911. Some facts about her career are clear from surviving architectural drawings and other records.

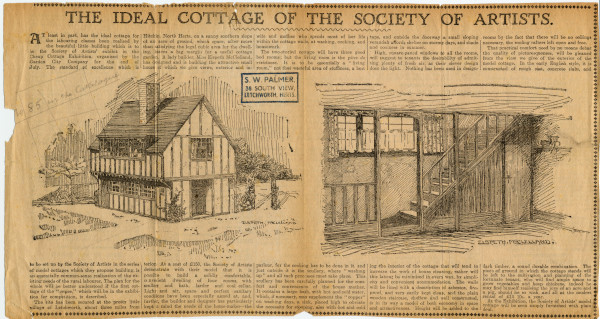
Cottage Design by McClelland in 1905. 'The Ideal Cottage for the Society of Artists' - Winning cottage design for 106 Wilbury Road, Letchworth.
