= Georgiana Solomon =

Scottish philanthropist in South Africa and suffragette (1844-1933)

- Detail from a painting by her son William
- Born: Georgiana Margaret Thomson; 18 August 1844 near Kelso, Scotland
- Died: 24 June 1933 (aged 88); Eastbourne, England
- Occupations: School principal, suffragette
- Spouse: Saul Solomon (m. 1874; died 1892)
- Children: 6; including Daisy Solomon (daughter); Saul Solomon (son)

Georgiana Margaret Solomon (née Thomson; born 18 August 1844 – 24 June 1933) was a British educator and campaigner, involved with a wide range of causes in Britain and South Africa. She and her only surviving daughter, Daisy Solomon, were suffragettes; as members of the Women's Social and Political Union, they were imprisoned during the campaign for women's suffrage for breaking the windows of Black Rod's office.

== Early life ==
Georgiana Thomson was born near Kelso in Scotland to George Thomson and Margaret Stuart Thomson (née Scott). The Oxford Dictionary of National Biography characterises her father as "an unsuccessful gentleman farmer". She was educated at a small boarding school in Edinburgh.

== Career ==
She began her teaching career at the same school where she had been educated. Later, she accepted a position as a governess to a Liverpool family. By the 1870s, the movement to expand education to young women was gaining momentum in the English-speaking world. A committee in the Cape Colony was setting up the first such establishment, and, through Reverend Andrew Murray, approached her to lead it. She decided to accept the challenge, and emigrated in 1873 to South Africa. She was the inaugural principal of what is now the Good Hope Seminary High School.

== Marriage and children ==
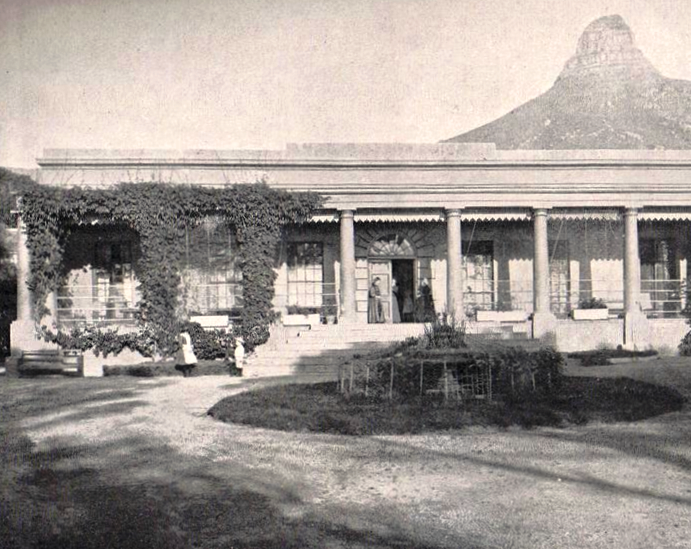
Clarensville House in Sea Point

There she met the liberal politician and newspaper proprietor Saul Solomon, known for his belief in equality based on creed, colour or class. Their views tallied on many matters, not least, girls' education: he owned a first edition of Mary Wollstonecraft's polemic A Vindication of the Rights of Woman. Despite his being almost twice her age, they married and their wedding took place on 21 March 1874 at his home, Clarensville House. The service had an alteration to the standard Anglican marriage vows: neither wife nor husband wished her to promise to obey. However, the two clergymen officiating told the couple that this would render the ceremony without authority, so the words were included. One historian describes their marriage as "idyllic".

The couple had six children: Saul, who became a judge in the Supreme Court of South Africa; Margaret; George; William Ewart Gladstone, a painter who followed his mother into educational leadership as principal of the Bombay School of Art; Daisy, a prominent suffragette; and a son who died in infancy.

In 1881, the eldest daughter drowned - as did the governess who tried to rescue the child. Saul retired from public life in 1888 and the family moved to Bedford, England, where their sons attended Bedford School. Saul died in 1892, leaving Georgiana with four children to raise. She made a home for them, first at Sidcup, Kent (now part of Outer London) and then in West Hampstead (now Inner London). She lived as a widow for over 40 years.

== Activism ==
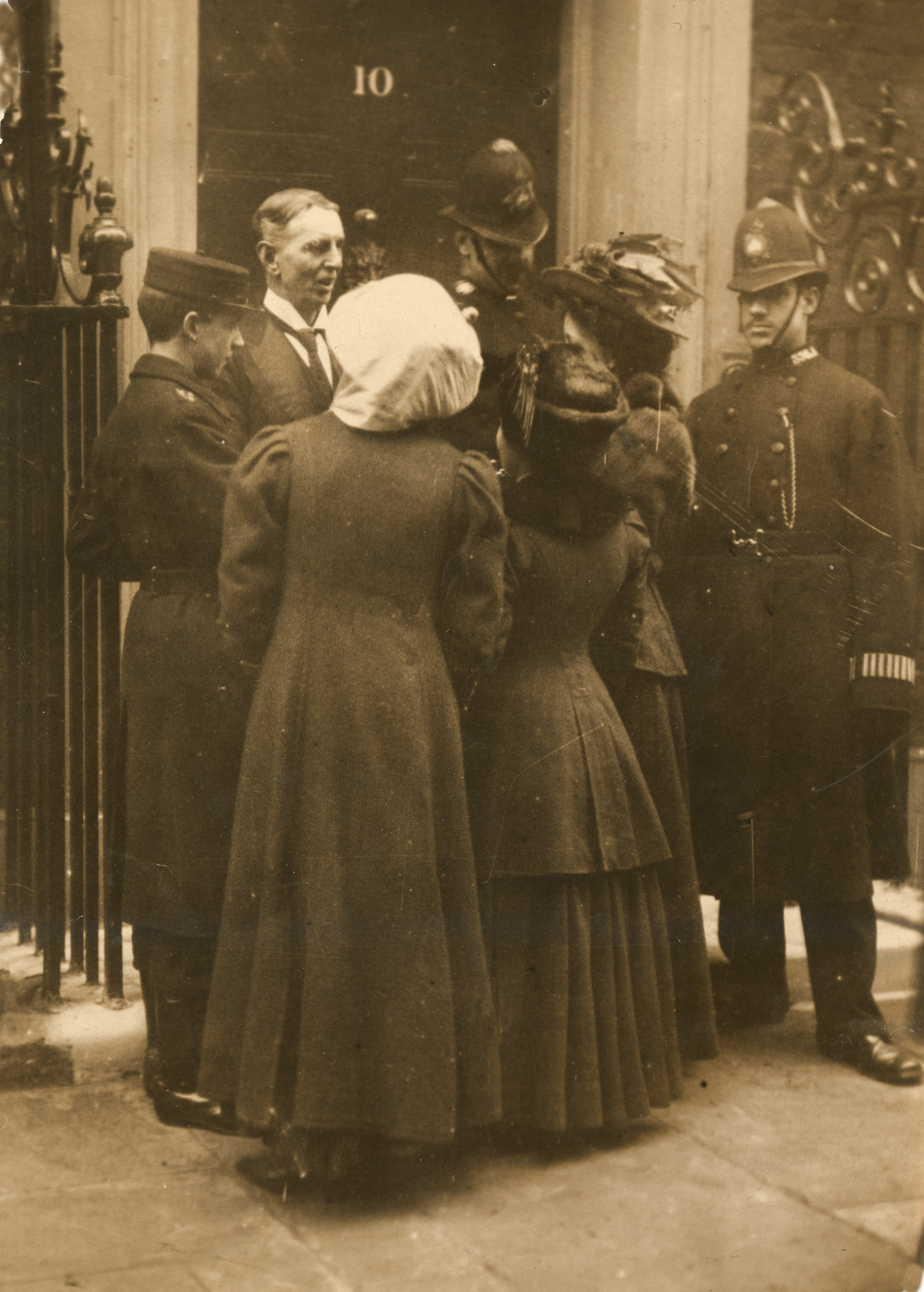
Daisy Solomon and Elspeth Douglas McClelland outside 10 Downing Street in 1909, trying to have themselves delivered as letters

Georgiana Solomon married into a large family and surrounded herself with educated women. These included Emilie Solomon, first female chair of the Congregational Union; Mary Brown, a great friend of Olive Schreiner; Schreiner herself, author of The Story of An African Farm; Alice Matilda Greene, teacher and campaigner; and Elizabeth Maria Molteno.

Her first reform activities were around the issues of prostitution and alcoholism. The social purity and temperance movements were at their height. (For context, the Ladies National Association for the Repeal of the Contagious Diseases Acts was established in 1869 by Elizabeth Wolstenholme and Josephine Butler.) She spoke for the Women's Christian Temperance Union, eventually becoming the president of the Cape Colony chapter and, from 1925 to 1931, a world vice-president.

In 1902 Solomon returned to visit South Africa, where she assisted in the campaign for women's suffrage. On 16 October 1904 she co-founded the Suid-Afrikaanse Vrouefederasie (South African Women's Federation) with Annie Botha, wife of the first prime minister of the Union of South Africa. The charity is still in existence.

Back in England, Georgiana became President of the Sidcup Women's Liberation Association (WLA) in 1906. Georgiana and Daisy Solomon both joined the Women's Social and Political Union in 1908, and the following year Georgiana was involved in two unsuccessful deputations to the Prime Minister. The first was in March and the second was on 18 November 1910 (Black Friday), when the deputation was led by Emmeline Pankhurst to petition Prime Minister Asquith. Solomon was in the front of the delegation as they entered the Speaker's Entrance and was told that Asquith was not present, she asked to see Colonel Seely whom she knew. Seely came out and listened politely but would not send for a Minister to meet the delegation. Solomon then asked for another acquaintance Mr. Birrell and also wrote a note on House of Commons headed notepaper to be delivered to the Prime Minister as follows:

“Dear sir, – I have the honour address you in writing, because I learn that you are not at present in the House. I therefore am unable have the privilege of seeing you. May therefore enclose the resolution which was deputed to lay before you by the Women’s Parliament Caxton Hall, and to request that you will give the same earnest consideration.”

Participants included Dr Elizabeth Garrett Anderson, Dr Louisa Garrett Anderson, Anne Cobden-Sanderson, Princess Sophia Duleep Singh, Dorinda Neligan and Hertha Ayrton.

On 4 March 1912, she began a one-month sentence in Holloway Prison for breaking nine windows in the House of Lords, the office attacked was that used by Black Rod. She left the WSPU in 1913, but remained active in other suffrage organisations as well as the social purity movement. WSPU gave up its militancy for the war effort, but Solomon, for example, chaired the Women's Freedom League Hampstead 'at home' meeting, raising funds for the Women's Suffrage National Aid Corps., hosted by Myra Sadd Brown, and spoke along with Charlotte Despard and Anna Munro, saying that she was 'glad the Freedom League was keeping the Suffrage flag flying' and felt that this was 'not the time to our Movement sink into the background.'

She maintained her involvement in South African developments from her base in London. Solomon offered hospitality to the visiting delegation led by William Schreiner who had come to London to press for equal suffrage for all races. She opposed the South Africa Act 1909 which limited the franchise (unlike the Cape Qualified Franchise). This is when she grew to know Gandhi. She opposed the Natives Land Act, 1913, thinking the colour bar "un-British". She served on the leadership of the Aborigines' Protection Society, where she worked with Jane Cobden Unwin.

Solomon died in Eastbourne.

== Works ==
- Echoes of Two Little Voices (1883), poetry concerning the early deaths of her children.
