= Good Hope Seminary High School =

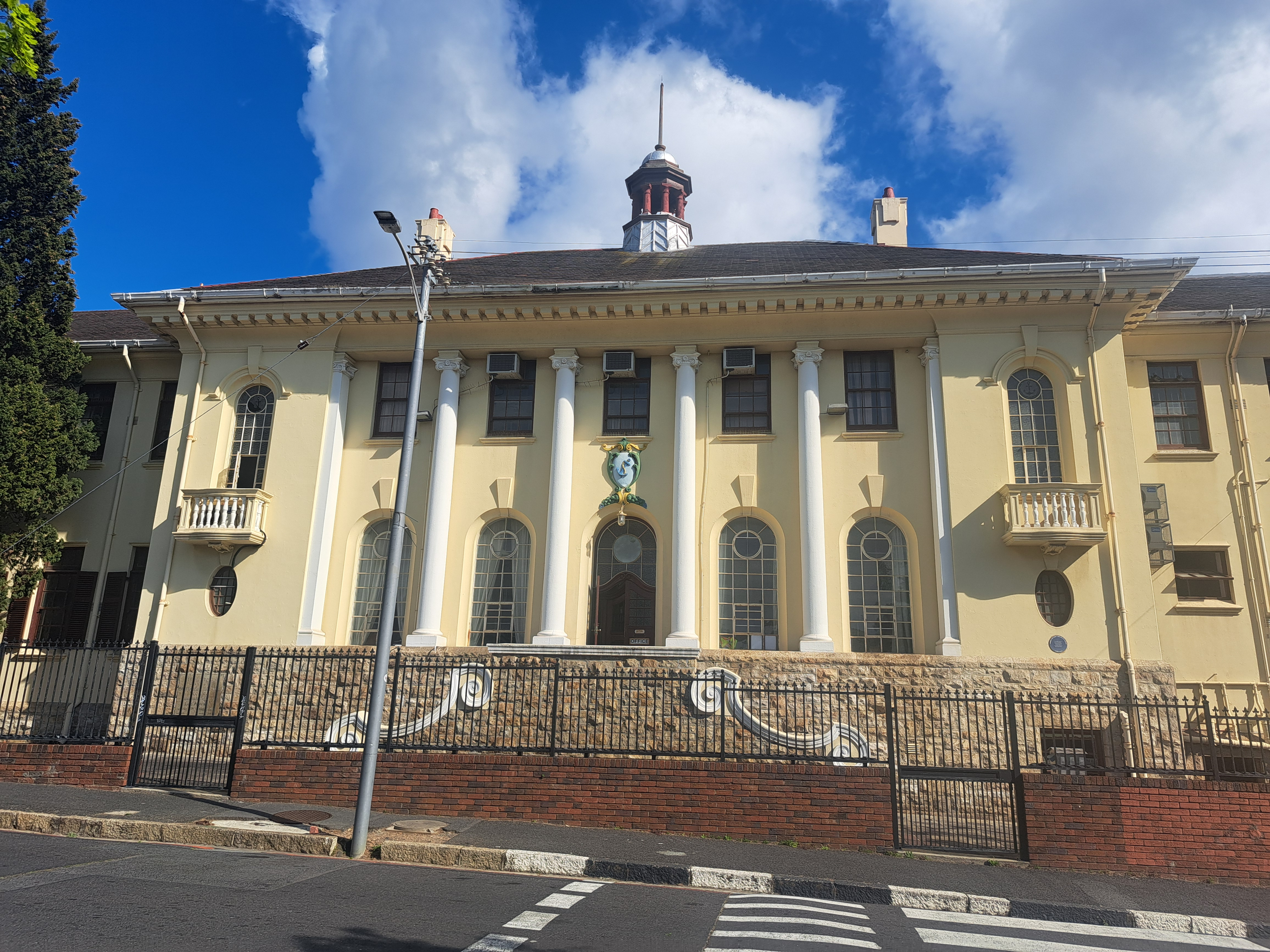

Location
- Coordinates: 33.933331°S 18.417238°E

Information
- School type: All-girl public high school
- Motto: Constantia et Virtute (With Courage and Perseverance)
- Established: October 6, 1873
- Principal: Ms L Van Egeren
- Grades: 8-12
- Website: www.goodhopeseminary.co.za

Good Hope Seminary High School is an all-girls public high school in the Western Cape. It was founded in 1873 by Reverend Andrew Murray. Georgiana Solomon was the schools inaugural principal.
