= Saul Solomon (judge) =

South African judge

The Honourable Saul Solomon QC

Judge of the Transvaal Provincial Division of the Supreme Court
- In office 1927–1945

Personal details
- Born: 9 April 1875 Sea Point, Cape Town, Cape Colony
- Died: 10 December 1960 (aged 85) St James, Cape Town, South Africa
- Spouse(s): Gertrude Mary Thompson (1903–1904); Wilding Robertson (from 1910)
- Children: 2
- Parents: Saul Solomon (father); Georgiana Solomon (mother)
- Education: Lincoln College, Oxford
- Profession: Advocate

Hon. Saul Solomon QC (1875–1960), styled Mr Justice Solomon, was a judge in the Supreme Court of South Africa.

== Biography ==
Solomon was born in Sea Point, Cape Town, on 9 April 1875. His mother was Georgiana Solomon who was a teacher and later a suffragette. His father was Saul Solomon, the influential liberal politician of the Cape Colony. Saul Solomon was educated at Bedford School and at Lincoln College, Oxford, where he was a scholar. His sister Daisy Solomon was also a suffragette, and 'posted' as a letter to the British Prime Minister at 10 Downing Street in 1909.

Solomon was called to the English Bar by Lincoln's Inn, in 1900, appointed as King's Counsel, in 1919, and as a judge in the Supreme Court of South Africa, between 1927 and 1945.

Mr Justice Solomon died in St James, Cape Town, on 10 December 1960.

== Family ==
Solomon married first at St. Saviour′s Church, Claremont, Cape Town, on 8 January 1903, to Gertrude Mary Thompson (d 1904), daughter of Canon and Mrs Thompson of Aldeburgh Vicarage, Suffolk. His first wife died the following year, and in 1910 he married secondly to Wilding Robertson. They had two sons.
