= Jessie Kenney =

English suffragette

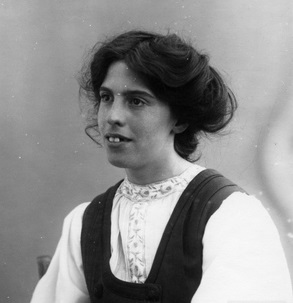
- Born: Jessica Kenney; 1887; Lees, Lancashire, England
- Died: 1985 (aged 97–98)
- Occupations: Activist, stewardess
- Relatives: Kitty, Annie, Nell and Jenny (sisters)

Jessica "Jessie" Kenney (1887–1985) was an English suffragette who was jailed for assaulting the Prime Minister and Home Secretary in a protest to gain suffrage for women in the UK. Details of a bombing campaign to support their cause were discovered by the authorities in her flat when Kenney was sent abroad to convalesce. She later trained as a wireless operator but worked as a stewardess.

== Life and activism ==
Kenney was born in 1887 in Lees (now part of the Metropolitan Borough of Oldham). She was the seventh daughter of twelve children (of whom eleven survived infancy) to Horatio Nelson Kenney (1849-1912) and Anne Wood (1852-1905); the family was poor and working class. Her activist sisters were Caroline (Kitty), Ann (Annie), Sarah (Nell) and Jane (Jennie). Annie and Jessie took leading roles in the Women's Social and Political Union. Annie, eight years older than Jessie, promoted the study of literature among her colleagues, inspired by Robert Blatchford's publication, The Clarion.

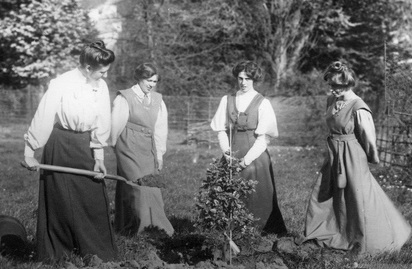
Mary Blathwayt planting a tree at Suffragette's Rest with Vera Holme, Jessie and Annie Kenney in 1909

Jessie Kenney worked in a cotton mill from the age of thirteen, along with her sisters Annie, Alice and Jennie becoming involved in the trades union there. Her mother died in 1905 at the age of fifty three and in the same year Kenney became actively involved in the Women's Social and Political Union (WSPU) after she and her sister, Annie, heard Teresa Billington-Greig and Christabel Pankhurst speak at the Oldham Clarion Vocal Club. Kenney did not have Annie's gift for public speaking but she was more organised. In 1906 she became the secretary of Emmeline Pethick-Lawrence. She would organise members to interrupt meetings and to send deputations.

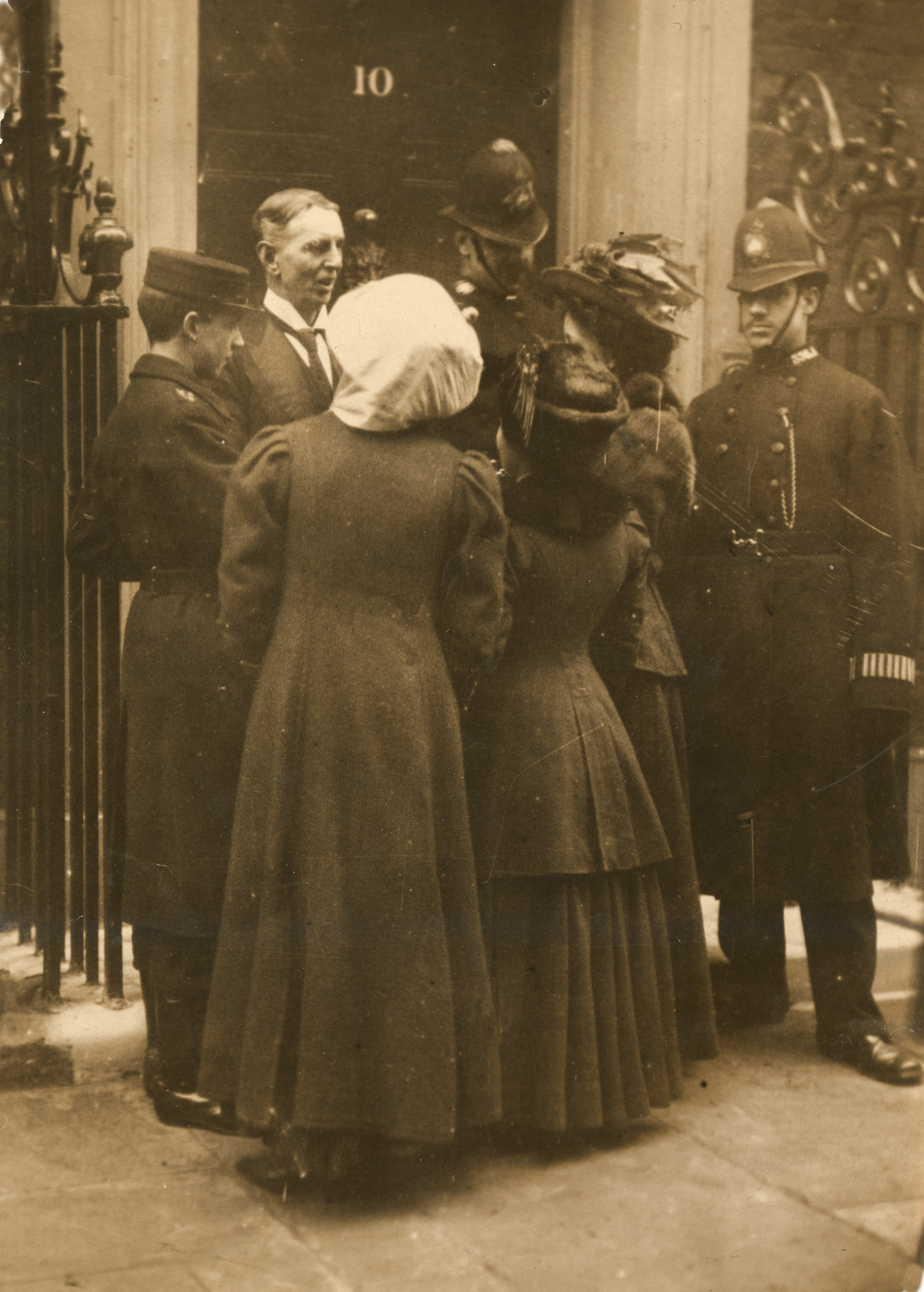
Daisy Solomon and Elspeth McClelland with a post boy, police and an official outside 10 Downing Street, attempting to get themselves delivered as letters

The WSPU used several tactics to press the case for women's suffrage with the government. The Young Hot Bloods was formed by Kenney and Adela Pankhurst in 1907.

On 5 September 1908, three of them, Kenney, Elsie Howey and Vera Wentworth, chased and then struggled physically with the Prime Minister, H. H. Asquith, and his Home Secretary Herbert Gladstone during a golf match and later that day threw stones in the window at their dinner at Lympne Castle.

The post office regulations allowed people to send "human letters". On 23 February 1909, Kenney took advantage of this to send two delegates, Daisy Solomon and Elspeth McClelland, from Strand Post Office to the Prime Minister and alerted a news reporter. On 16 April 1909, Kenney was in an early morning delegation who met Emmeline Pethick-Lawrence on her release from Holloway prison and took her to a breakfast, with 500 WSPU members, at the Criterion Restaurant in Piccadilly Circus.

Kenney and Wentworth were eventually jailed for assaulting the Prime Minister. During the summer recess, they and Howey had pursued him near his holiday home in Clovelly, Devon, approaching him in the church, on the golf course asking why he was on holiday whilst women were imprisoned, and then secretly decorated his private garden with leaflets, banners in the three WSPU colours and discs saying 'Release Patricia Woodlock', but at that time were not arrested.

On 10 December 1909 Kenney disguised herself as a telegraph boy to obtain access to the Prime Minister at a public meeting in Manchester. She was unsuccessful but again a picture of the incident was used as publicity for the cause.

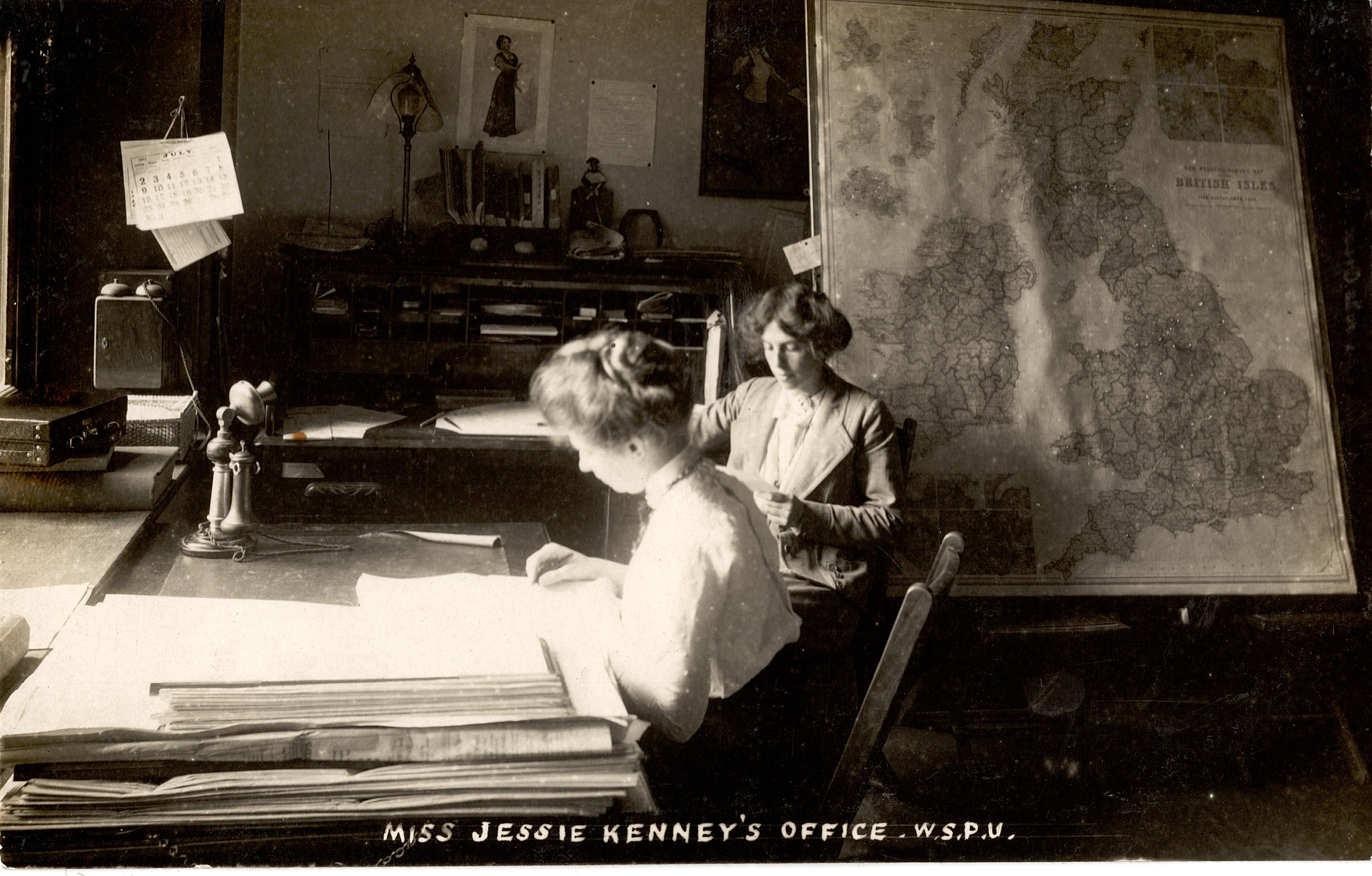
Kenney's offices at WSPU HQ (Clement's Inn) in 1911

Jessie Kenney and her sister Annie were invited to Mary Blathwayt's home, Eagle House at Batheaston where the leading suffragettes met. Any significant visitor to Batheaston was asked to plant a tree to record their achievement on behalf of the cause, for example a prison sentence. It was an attack on government ministers which led Mary's mother Emily Blathwayt to withdraw from the WSPU due to its militant tactics. This event also led Gladstone to consider surveillance and forming a special branch of police able to use advance information to protect cabinet ministers from militant action.

In the WSPU's march of 10,000 suffragists and supporters on 18 June 1910, Kenney led the procession through London on horseback with 'General' Flora Drummond and other senior members of the movement. By 1913 Kenney was ill and was sent from the flat she shared with Annie to Switzerland to recover. It was described as "a breakdown" but Mary Blathwayt remembers it as a lung infection. Kenney's illness prevented her from destroying papers in her flat and as a result incriminating evidence was found. The papers provided evidence to show that the WSPU's chemist Edwy Godwin Clayton had been involved in acts of arson on behalf of the WSPU. Clayton and other were convicted and he was sentenced to 21 months in jail. Clayton went on hunger strike and was released after 15 days and he went abroad.

== World War I ==
Emmeline Pankhurst put the women's suffrage movement aside for the period of the war. Kenney, like many, followed her lead.

In June 1917 Kenney accompanied Emmeline Pankhurst on a trip to Russia aiming to encourage Russian women to the war effort, on behalf of the British Government, her writings of this journey and their experiences were never published. Edward Tupper of the National Sailors' and Firemen's Union had organised among the seamen of SS Vulture to refuse to accept Ramsay MacDonald and Fred Jowett as passengers on board the ship. However Tupper, made it clear that Kenney and Pankhurst would be acceptable.

== Wireless ==
After working for the WSPU she decided to work in a field related to her interest in radio and science in general. She took advice from Emmeline Pankhurst and Marie Curie and realised that with her resources she may be able to train as a wireless operator. This was not without ambition as all the forms assumed that operators would be male. In 1923 she attended the North Wales Wireless College and obtained a first class certificate in radio telegraphy.

She never found work as a wireless operator and had to work as a stewardess. She worked with Furness and Orient Line.

== Later life ==
During the Second World War she lived for a time with her sister and brother-in-law, Annie and James Taylor, in Letchworth. She had followed her sister from Theosophy to the Rosicrucian faith. She returned to various temporary homes in London, working as a school secretary and welfare assistant at Battersea County School. From 1969 until her death in 1985, aged 97 or 98, she was in the care of the Missionary Franciscan Sisters at Braintree, Essex and became a Roman Catholic on Christmas Day 1973.
