= Jenny Kenney =

British suffragette

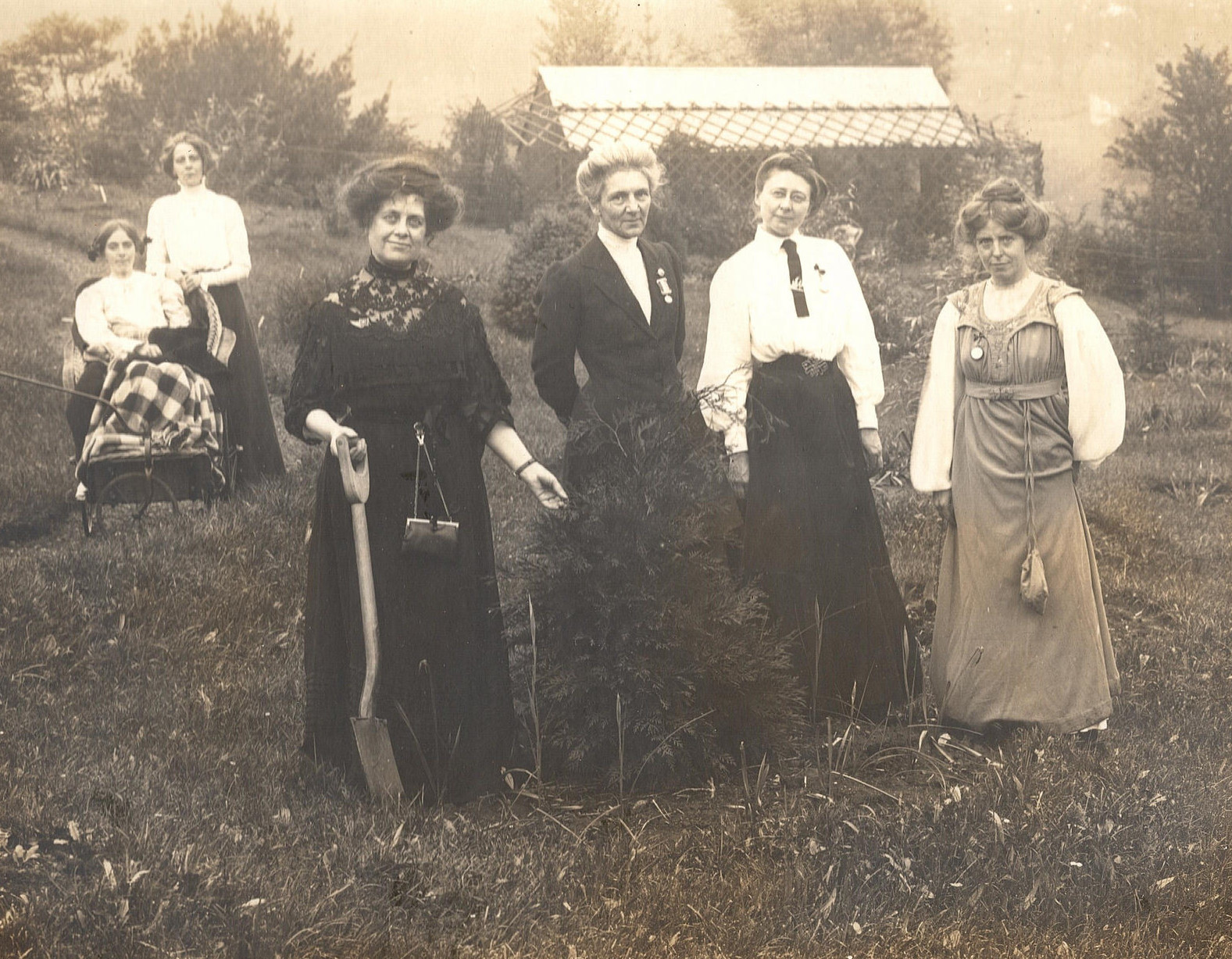
- Jenny (seated) and Kitty Kenny with other suffragettes including Annie Kenney (far right) at Blathwayt's
- Born: Jane Kenney; 1884; Lees, Oldham, United Kingdom of Great Britain and Ireland
- Died: 1961 (aged 76–77)
- Occupations: Suffragette and Montessori teacher
- Organization: Women's Social and Political Union
- Parent(s): Father: Horatio Nelson Kenney (1849–1912); Mother: Ann Wood (1852–1905)
- Relatives: Nell, Annie, Kitty and Jessie (sisters)

Jane "Jenny" Kenney (1884–1961) also known as Jennie, was a British suffragette and Montessori teacher, who supported her sisters Annie Kenney and Jessie Kenney in the Women's Social and Political Union. She later became a joint principal of an independent school in New York, USA.

== Life and career ==
Jane Kenney was born in Lees, Oldham, Lancashire, the eighth child of a family of twelve siblings (eleven of whom survived infancy) of Horatio Nelson Kenney (1849–1912) and Ann Wood (1852–1905) both cotton workers. Her father was from Ashton-under-Lyne whose parents were blacksmith's labourer, William and Agnes. Her mother's father was James Wood, a cotton mill worker. Her parents were married in April 1873 at Leesfield parish church, and are buried at Greenacres cemetery, Oldham.

Although they lived in poverty, and were largely home educated due to working from a young age, both their parents encouraged them to read and debate. Kenney began working in the cotton mill as a card room hand, but later became a teacher as did two other girls. One brother became a businessman, and another brother Roland became the first editor of the Daily Herald, and later worked in the UK diplomatic service. Their mother died young at fifty-three, at their home at 71 Redgrave Street, Oldham. Kenney was a Montessori teacher, as was her older sister Caroline (Kitty). Jane taught in Accrington, then went to Rome as a student with Maria Montessori 1914, becoming Montessori 'demonstrator' in England.

== Suffragette activism ==
Kenney joined the suffragettes, following leading activists, her sisters Annie and Jessie of the Women's Social and Political Union ( WSPU)

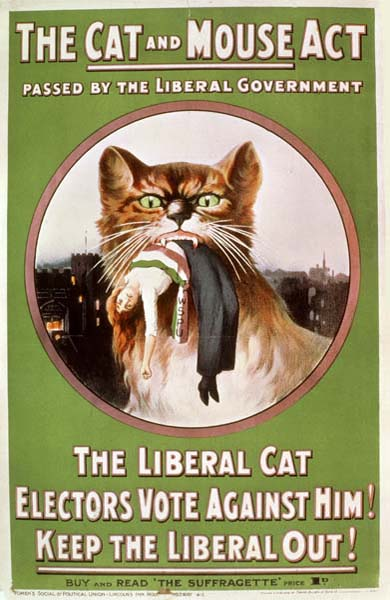
Cat and Mouse Act poster

Kenney offered refuge or rest for women released following imprisonment, hunger strike and force-feeding, under the Cat and Mouse Act, where she and her sister Caroline (Kitty) ran a Montessori school, at Tower Cressy, Campden Hill, from around 1915. The grand house had been acquired by the Pankhursts, including using money from the WSPU surplus funds to be fitted out for an adoption home and nursery, causing some controversy. There was also a tension with Nurse Pine who was there to nurse the women, but did not approve of the liberal education methods of Montessori.

== Move to USA ==
In 1916 Jenny and her sister Kitty went to the USA, appointed by Jessica Garretson Finch as joint teachers in charge of the preparatory school for female pupils moving on to the Lenox School, New York. They retired as joint principals in 1929 (by which time the school had grown to 170 students and 24 staff on the faculty) and then taught in Philadelphia before settling in California.

Jane Kenney died in 1961.
