= Nell Kenney =

British suffragette

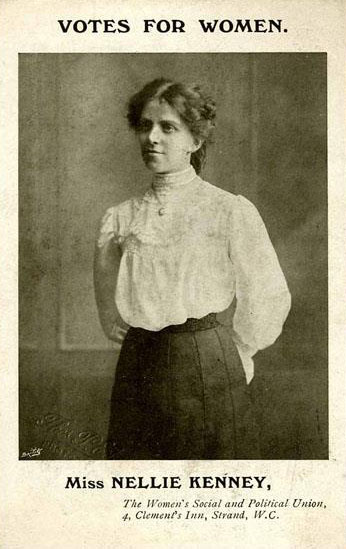
- Postcard of Miss Nellie Kenney, c. 1906
- Born: Sarah Ellen Kenney; 1876; Lees, Lancashire, United Kingdom of Great Britain and Ireland
- Died: 1953 (aged 76–77)
- Resting place: Montreal, Quebec, Canada
- Other names: Sarah Ellen Clarke; Nellie Kenney
- Occupation: Suffragist
- Spouse: Frank Randall Clarke
- Children: 3 Beatrice, Dorothy & Lawrence
- Relatives: Annie, Jessie, Jenny (Jane) and Kitty (sisters)

Sarah Ellen Kenney Clarke (1876–1953), known as Nell Kenney or Nellie Kenney, was a British suffragette best known as a sister of prominent suffragists Annie, Jessie, Jenny, and Kitty Kenney.

== Life ==
Kenney was born in 1876, in Lees, the third daughter of Horation Nelson and Agnes Kenney who later lived at 71 Redgrave Street, Oldham. She was one of a family of twelve siblings, eleven of whom survived infancy. Nell, like others in her family went to work at a young age in a British cotton mill.

Her mother died at the age of fifty-three in January 1905, and left Nell's younger sister Annie in charge of the six siblings and father (who had nursed his wife in her last illness). Her sisters Jenny (Jane) and Caroline (Kitty) became Montessori teachers as well as suffragettes and emigrated to the USA in 1916.

Only a few months later, Nell was the recipient of a noteworthy letter from her sister Annie, after Annie's release from Strangeways Prison in October 1905. Annie's arboretum was established by the Blathwayt family where recovering suffragettes could stay and plant a commemorative tree.

Nell was also an active suffragette. In 1907, she was arrested and sent to prison for demonstrations at the House of Commons. She also organized Women's Social and Political Union activities in the West Midlands.

She met her husband, Frank Randall Clarke (1872–1955), at a suffragette rally. The couple married around 1908 and emigrated to Montreal, Canada. They had three children: Beatrice (born 1910), and Dorothy (born 1911)and John Lawrence (born 1914). Frank Randall Clarke was involved in work with disabled people.

Nell died in 1953 and is buried in Montreal. Some of her papers are included in the Kenney Papers collection at the University of East Anglia Archives.

== See also ==
- List of suffragists and suffragettes
