= Kitty Kenney =

British suffragette

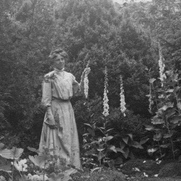
- Kenney by Colonel Linley Blathwayt at Eagle House
- Born: Caroline Kenney; 1880; United Kingdom of Great Britain and Ireland
- Died: 1952 (aged 71–72); United States of America
- Education: Maria Montessori
- Occupation: Headteacher
- Known for: Suffragette
- Relatives: Sarah (Nell), Ann (Annie), Jessica (Jessie) and Jane (Jenny) (sisters)

Caroline "Kitty" Kenney (1880–1952) was a sister of Annie Kenney, one of the most well-known British suffragettes to go on hunger strike, for whom the Blathwayts planted commemorative trees in their Eagle House garden in Batheaston, Somerset. Another sister, Jessie, was abroad when her involvement in explosives was discovered by the authorities.

== Biography ==
Caroline (Kitty) was the sixth child of 12 siblings, 11 of whom survived infancy, and one of the seven daughters of Horatio Nelson Kenney (1849–1912) and Anne Wood (1852–1905). Her sisters included Sarah (Nell), Ann (Annie), Jessica (Jessie), Alice and Jane (Jennie). Annie and Jessie took leading roles in the Women's Social and Political Union. Kitty and Jennie had been trained by Maria Montessori. They were employed; they ran a recovery centre for suffragettes in Kensington at a gothic pile known as Tower Cressy. The suffragettes needed to convalesce after they had been imprisoned and force-fed.

== Suffragette's Rest ==
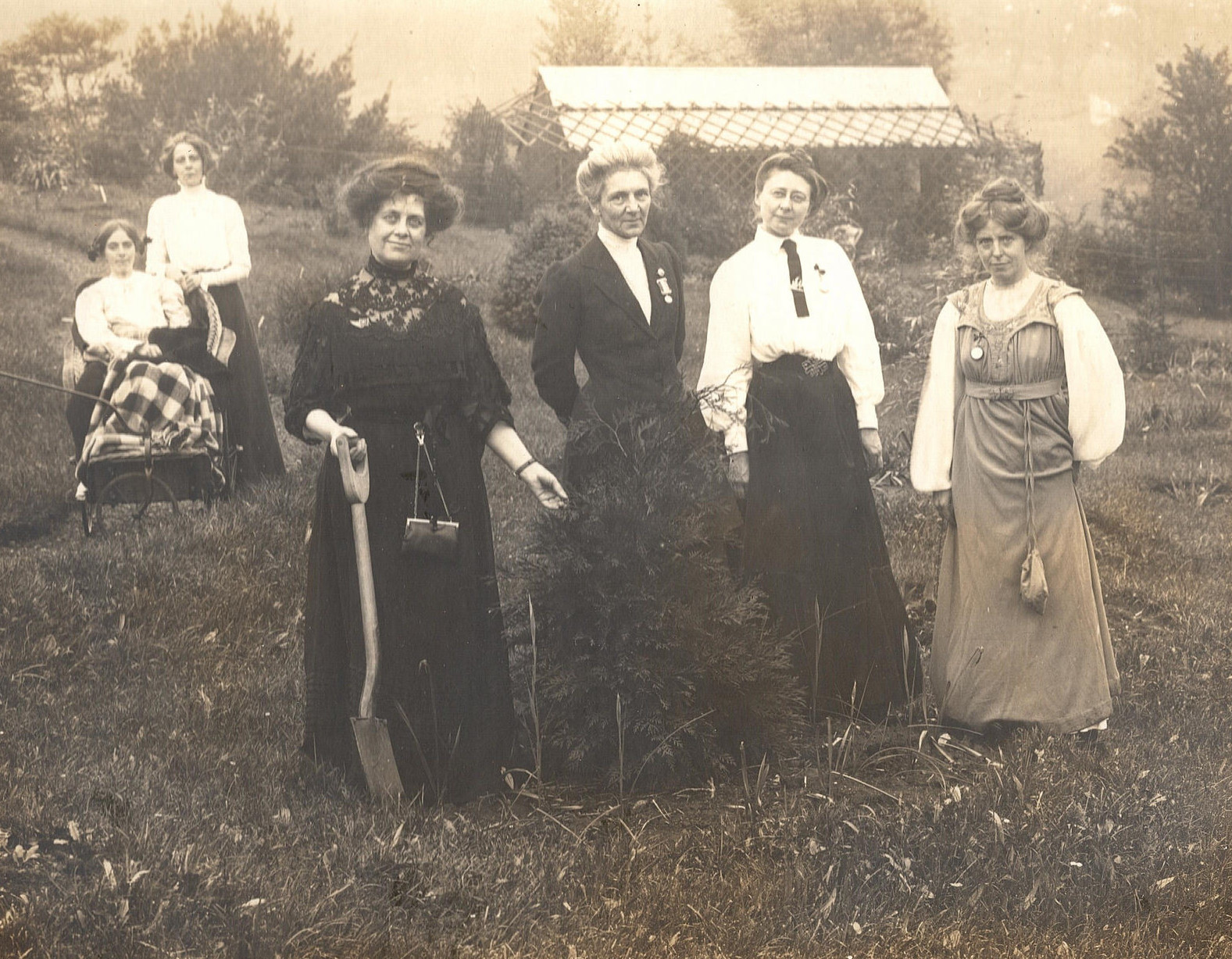
Jennie and Kitty Kenney, Florence Haig, Marion Wallace-Dunlop, Mary Blathwayt and Annie Kenney at Eagle House

In August 1909 Kitty was first invited to Eagle House, home of the Blathwayts and also known as the Suffragette's Rest, to join her two sisters.

During the summer of 1910, Kitty and her sister Jennie, who were both teachers, joined Annie at Eagle House to recuperate from illness. Both had surgery and further nursing care from the Blathwayts and remained at Batheaston for some months.

Kitty Kenney had been given a Hunger Strike Medal 'for Valour' by WSPU.

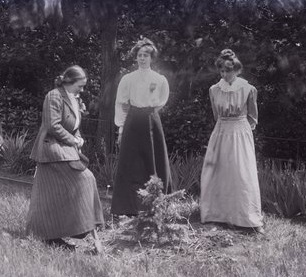
Adela Pankhurst, Kitty and Annie Kenney, 1910

== America ==
In 1916 the Lenox School, a primary school to prepare girls to enter the Finch School, was founded in New York. The Lenox School employed Kitty and Jennie Kenney as joint heads until they retired in 1929.

Kitty moved to Philadelphia and then finally to California. She died in 1952.

== See also ==
- Women's suffrage in the United Kingdom
