= Alice Morrissey =

British suffragette (1868–1912)

- Born: Mary Alice Connolly c. 1868
- Died: 1912
- Organization: Women's Social and Political Union
- Known for: Socialist activist and suffragette
- Political party: Independent Labour Party
- Spouse: John Wolfe Tone Morrissey (m. 1891)

Mary Alice Connolly Morrissey (c. 1868 – 1912) was a British Roman Catholic socialist leader and suffragette activist from Liverpool, who was imprisoned in the campaign for women's right to vote.

== Life ==
Born into a Catholic family, Mary Alice Connolly's brother became a priest. In 1891, Connolly married John Wolfe Tone Morrissey, who was elected as Liverpool's first socialist councillor. They both had a public political profile and worked together, locally and nationally until her sudden death in 1912. Morrissey was also, in her own right, a branch convenor for political organisations in Merseyside, as well as a Poor Law Guardian. She co-founded the Liverpool Women's Social and Political Union (WSPU) branch and was imprisoned twice for suffragette activism.

== Suffrage and socialism ==
Morrissey was a socialist in the Independent Labour Party (ILP), a devout and active Catholic and also joined the movement for votes for women, firstly in the Liverpool Women's Suffrage Society (a branch of the National Union of Women's Suffrage Societies (NUWSS), the suffragists) in 1904. Morrissey quickly left that society, along with Dr Alice Ker, as Morrissey saw it as undemocratic and class led. Morrissey was forthright in criticising the lack of a campaign to go out and educate women across all areas of the city to be ready to use the vote. Morrissey went onto become a militant suffragette leader in starting up, alongside Mabel Labouchere (who was branch secretary until 1907), the Liverpool branch of the Women's Social and Political Union (WSPU) the suffragettes. Morrissey was considered a friend of the WSPU leaders, the Pankhursts and Hannah Mitchell. However her public profile focussed on her role in the local labour movement, but The Labour Leader praised not her socialist fervour or strength of her case for female enfranchisement, but for her care for the 'creature comforts' of ILP potential recruits at the 'Socialist Socials' in the early 1900s.

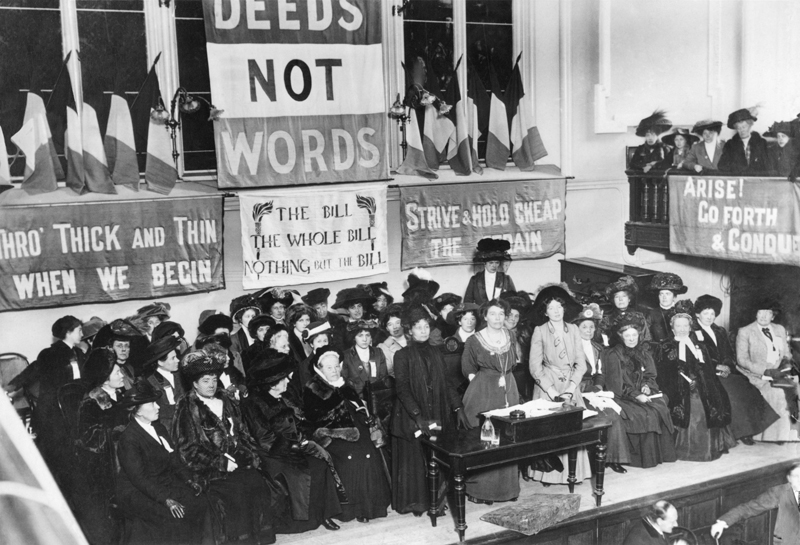
Suffragette meeting in Caxton Hall, Manchester

In 1906, Morrissey was among the women protesting and heckling during a speech by the then Liberal Prime Minister Sir Henry Campbell-Bannerman to an audience of around 6,000 at the Sun Hall. Morrissey and Patricia Woodlock also held large open outdoor meetings, but were less often invited to the more elite 'at home' drawing room discussions amongst middle-class women of WSPU.

Although both suffrage organisations and political parties discouraged dual membership because of conflicting policy perspectives, social activism and suffragette activism were equally important to Morrissey, who served as the ILP branch secretary (1907–08) and first female delegate to the Liverpool Labour Representative Committee. Morrissey was a strong campaigner for John Hill, ILP candidate in the by-election for Kirkdale constituency in September 1907. Morrissey spoke along with other socialist women including Mary Bamber at ILP public meetings and was praised by The Labour Leader, for that and cited as an example in complaints about the attitude of some WSPU members who were not seen positively supporting ILP candidates, who were actually sympathetic to their cause. But in Liverpool the two movements sometimes held joint protest events and their local leaders appeared to recognise the individual women's rights to hold opinions for both causes.

Morrissey led ILP meetings with Woodlock, Emma Hillier, Hattie Mahood, and others to build up socialist support for women's suffrage, but the women did not have the power to control and plan their activities in ILP compared with the WSPU. The suffragette movement recognised Morrissey's roles as an "agitator, orator, organiser and due two prison terms, a martyr." When Ada Flatman left the Liverpool WSPU, suddenly in late 1910, following a disagreement on tactics, Morrissey volunteered as interim WSPU secretary and organiser. Morrissey also became District Secretary of the Women's Cooperative Guild (WCG) in 1911. Morrissey and her husband toured around the south of England for ILP propaganda just before she died suddenly in 1912.

== Faith and politics ==
The Catholic Church did not take a political stance on women's suffrage at the start, rather its spiritual leaders pronounced concerns about the impact of political engagement in the role of women in civil society, for example Cardinal Manning the Archbishop of Westminster (a former Anglican) said in 1871 at St. Mary Moorfield that he hoped English womanhood would "resist by a stern moral refusal, the immodesty which would thrust women from their private life of dignity and supremacy into the public conflicts of men." His successor, Cardinal Vaughan, was more open to change and was reported as saying "I believe that the extension of the Parliamentary Franchise to women upon the same conditions as it is held by men would be a just and beneficial measure, tending to raise rather than to lower the course of national legislation." Morrissey was among the Catholic community who agreed with the more liberal approach, and was seen as principled in her prison experience, as reported in the Catholic press.

Morrissey and fellow Catholic WSPU leader, Patricia Woodlock, were imprisoned in March 1907, for suffragette activism. Other Catholic women activists locally included Florence Barry, daughter of a Persian Austrian merchant, Bertha Quinn a clothing worker of Leeds, Violet Bryant a nurse of Newcastle, and an Augustinian nun, Mother Mary Frances (of St Augustine's Priory girls school in Ealing), who chained herself to railings, broke windows and was imprisoned for the cause. Other Catholic women led debates and discussions instead, such as Gabrielle Jeffery, Mary Kendall, Alice Meynell, Elisabeth Christitch, and Leonara De Alberti (who became the editor of the Catholic Suffragist) establishing the first Catholic Women's Suffrage Society in 1911. By 1919, Christitch was given a Vatican Papal audience with Benedict XV the head of the Catholic faith, who was reported as having said "we should like to see women electors everywhere."

Despite sectarian tensions in Merseyside, Catholic and Protestant Church League for Women's Suffrage members worked effectively together, with joint events held occasionally. Eleanor Rathbone, who opposed WSPU militancy, nevertheless worked alongside individual WSPU members in Merseyside who engaged in society across political, religious and class divides.

== WSPU activism and prison ==
Morrissey established the Liverpool branch of the Pankhurst's WSPU with Patricia Woodlock and Emma Hillier, neither of whom were establishment figures: Woodlock the daughter of an impoverished artist and Hillier self-funded with a range of careers from missionary to dressmaker.

Morrissey's first arrest was at Belle Vue Manchester in June 1906, when she and her husband were heckling at a Liberal Party rally, and this was treated sympathetically by the socialist press. Morrissey was imprisoned in Holloway, and on her release was quoted in "Catholic Suffragist Released," in the Catholic Herald, 5 April 1907 saying 'so little deterred was she by her recent experience that she hoped they would not rest until they had 76 women out of every large town in goal." And the same publication printed Morrissey's prison-letter in an article "Votes for Women", on 26 April 1907 reporting Morrissey as writing that no nation was free while its women lived in "political silence," and adding "history teaches us that it is only by some people making sacrifices, that we will be freed."

In 1907, the three leaders set the focus and agenda for the Liverpool WSPU branch, homed in premises accessible to all at 6 Colquitt Street. As two had socialist backgrounds, they aimed to educate working women, holding street meetings in working class areas, factory gate meetings at lunch time, inviting former mill worker suffragette Annie Kenney to take a week of campaigning in the city. When Mary Gawthorpe led the Lancashire branches of WPSU there was support for these methods across the industrial north west. By 1908 the numbers attending had grown and in one case estimated as over a thousand. Under the branch leadership of Alice Davies, Morrissey was mentioned for organising Emmeline Pankhurst's visit to the Hardman Hall in 1912.
