= Hattie Mahood =

British Baptist deacon and women's suffragist (1860–1940)

Harriet Emma Mahood
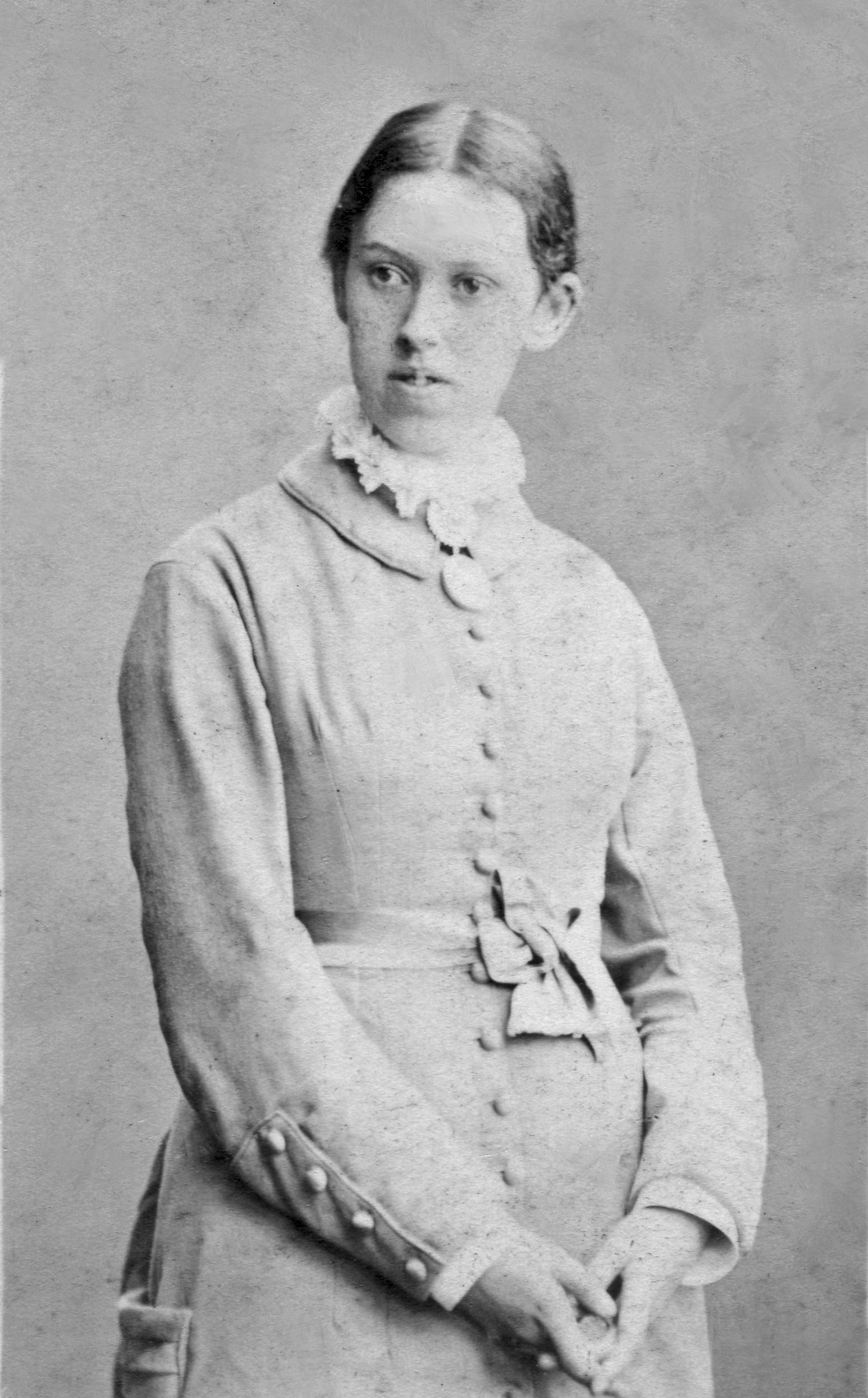
- Mahood as a young woman
- Born: Harriet Emma McDougall; 23 November 1860; Liverpool, England, UK
- Died: April 1940 (aged 79); Lathom Park, Ormskirk, England, UK
- Known for: Baptist deacon, suffragist, temperance activist

Harriet Emma Mahood (1860–1940), also known as Hattie or Harriett, was the first female deacon in the Baptist Church, a British constitutional women's suffrage campaigner and a strong supporter of the Temperance Movement. A Blue Plaque has been installed in her home town, and her work is also commemorated on a suffrage statue in Liverpool.

== Life ==
=== Early life and marriage ===
Harriet Emma McDougall was born in Liverpool on 23 November 1860. Her father was a Temperance Hotel keeper and she became a Temperance activist. At the age of 21, she married the hotel's manager, William Mahood. Instead of continuing in the hotel business, they started a floristry and fruit business, first in the Liverpool area and later in London. They had three sons. By 1894, Mahood was back in Liverpool where she was involved with the Mission of Love which provided accommodation and food for the homeless.

=== Early articles and religious background ===
An article by Mahood appeared in 1901 in The Forum periodical. Its title was “The Liberal Party: a menace to English democracy”. This was one of a number of articles that she contributed to The Forum and Nineteenth century and after; another was “The Modesty of Englishwomen”. This article was also favourably reviewed in The Manchester Courier and Lancashire General Advertiser of 3 April 1901, which stated that: "Mrs Mahood has some searching criticism of modern ideals" and she is quoted as condemning "an extreme want of reserve, self-respect and dignity….of the girls of today."

Mahood was a member of the congregation of the Baptist Pembroke Chapel, Liverpool under 'outspoken' pastor Reverend Charles F. Aked and through a report made to the chapel by Emily Hobhouse, she heard of the conditions prevailing in the Concentration Camps that the British had set up for Boer men, women and children in South Africa. Mahood subsequently wrote to the Daily News saying "During the early stages of the war fever I was hopeful that the spectacle of Englishmen going to war with the Boers in order to obtain the franchise for the Uttlanders of the Transvaal would have been too much for the sense of humour of women, the ‘Uttlander of society’ at home." The connections between temperance and contemporary societal issues were the subject of a discussion opened by Mahood at the spring conference of the Cheshire County Union of the British Women’s Temperance Association in 1907.

=== Activism 1908-1912 ===
The following year, in 1908, she was one of the speakers in favour of the Licensing Bill going through Parliament. For example, in the Parr Hall, Warrington, where a crowd of hundreds attended, Mahood was reported as supporting this Bill because its provisions ‘meant a drastic step in temperance reform’ and ‘the evils of drink had long been a curse in the land'. She also addressed this topic at the local Clarion Club in the Clarion Café in Kensington, Liverpool.

At the Wirral Women’s Suffrage Society, Mahood moved the vote of thanks to Edith Turner Bright and speaker Mrs Abadam at its meeting in New Brighton in April 1908, when the society there affiliated to the NUWSS and was declared as constitutional and non-party. Mahood spoke outside St George’s Hall Liverpool in June and, alongside Ada Broughton, in Seacombe in July 1908.

"Suffragist protest in court" is the title of a newspaper article from the same year, which covers a court case in which Mahood was one of sixteen local women who were formally applying for the right to a Parliamentary vote. They were represented by Mr. W. Swancott Morgan, with arguments to show that women were entitled to the vote. Mr Morgan presented historical evidence in favour of this argument, but the case was ultimately rejected.

Mahood was appointed the first female Deacon in the Baptist Church in England in 1910. The news item reporting this appointment also notes her membership of the Pembroke Chapel, and describes her as an "ardent advocate of women's suffrage".

"The ethics of militant tactics" was the subject of a talk also in 1910 by Mahood in New Brighton. In June, she spoke at Birkenhead along with suffrage leaders Dr Alice Ker and Ada Flatman at the town's Park Gates. She took part in two major suffrage events in the summer of 1910. The first was again at the Park Gates, Birkenhead after a procession through the town of all the local men's and women's suffrage societies, and other reform organisations such as the Independent Labour Party, the Artists’ Suffrage League and the Pembroke Social Reform League; many of the organisations’ contingents carried banners. Mahood was on the second platform, and moved support for the Conciliation Bill. The Birkenhead News reported the demonstration extensively. Mahood was asked: "Do women aspire to enter Parliament if they get a vote?" She answered: "When you have got one right, there is no reason why we should not ask for another." Later that same month, Liverpool was the scene of another rally, which attracted a huge crowd in front of St. George's Hall in a demonstration organised by the WSPU. Mahood said of the event that "they must agitate and carry out their programme to final and practical success". She said she believed in the justice, the chivalry and the fair play of the British people; the audience replied, "hear, hear".

Suffragette leader, Flora Drummond was the guest of the Wallasey branch of the WSPU in March 1911, when it was noted that Mahood was joint Honorary Secretary of this branch along with Mrs Heathcote. That year, Mahood spoke again in Birkenhead on "the moral effect of the struggle for the vote," and she was chief speaker in Southport in May.

Mahood refused to take part in the 1911 census; her name was instead signed by her son, Ronald, with whom she lived.

=== Decline in health and end of active political involvement ===
Her name is again (after some years) mentioned in connection with the Mission of Love in 1912, when her support in the "cleaning and clothing of poor children" is noted in the local press. Krista Cowman’s analysis of Engendering Citizenship The Political Involvement of Women on Merseyside, 1890 – 1920 states that Mahood "gave up the WSPU, socialism and Pembroke chapel following a breakdown in health in 1912." The following year, she wrote a long article, "The Stumbling Block in English Politics", on the suffrage cause, for The Forum periodical.

=== Letters to the editor ===
Mahood was an avid writer of letters to the editor, some refuting points raised by anti-suffrage correspondents with arguments and emotion. In 1913, she exchanged letters on the subject of the cat and mouse act with a Mr Hayward. In one letter Mahood stated that there was one ‘one remedy to stop the suffragist agitation, viz, votes for women.’ Mahood returned to the subject more strongly on 23 July 1913, when she asserted that "in dealing with the militant suffragettes, the authorities had resorted to barbarism".

=== World War I ===
During World War One, in 1916, she applied to a local tribunal for exemption from military service of her working foreman and only man employed (Jas. Ashcroft) at Mahood Bros where he worked as a nurseryman. In her application, she noted that her two sons were her partners in the business and were on active service abroad. The tribunal granted exemption (until the end of the following month). Also that year, Mahood presided over a meeting of smaller tenants of the Burscough estates and explained what actions she had taken in support of them. Her activities from then until her death in 1940 are not known.

== Death and legacy ==
She lived the rest of her life at the nursery in Burscough, dying in 1940 at her son Wilfred’s house, Boscobel, Lathom Park. Her 1940 obituary noted that she was descended from the Penderels' of Boscobel House, who had sheltered Charles II of England in his flight after the Battle of Worcester, and notes that Mahood herself had visited the location many times; her son's house where she had lived was itself called "Boscobel". The obituary also noted that she had been a deacon of the Pembroke Chapel and had been editor of Doctor Aked's "Plain Truth"; and that she made regular contributions of magazine articles to The Forum and Nineteenth century and after; and it stated her active involvement in the suffrage movement.

In 2018, to mark the centenary of the Representation of the People Act 1918, Mahood’s contribution was featured in an exhibition at the Chapel Gallery, Ormskirk (from October 2018 – January 2019) and many of her letters were on public display.

A booklet about her was also produced by the Images of Burscough local heritage group, thanks to financial support from the National Lottery heritage Fund.

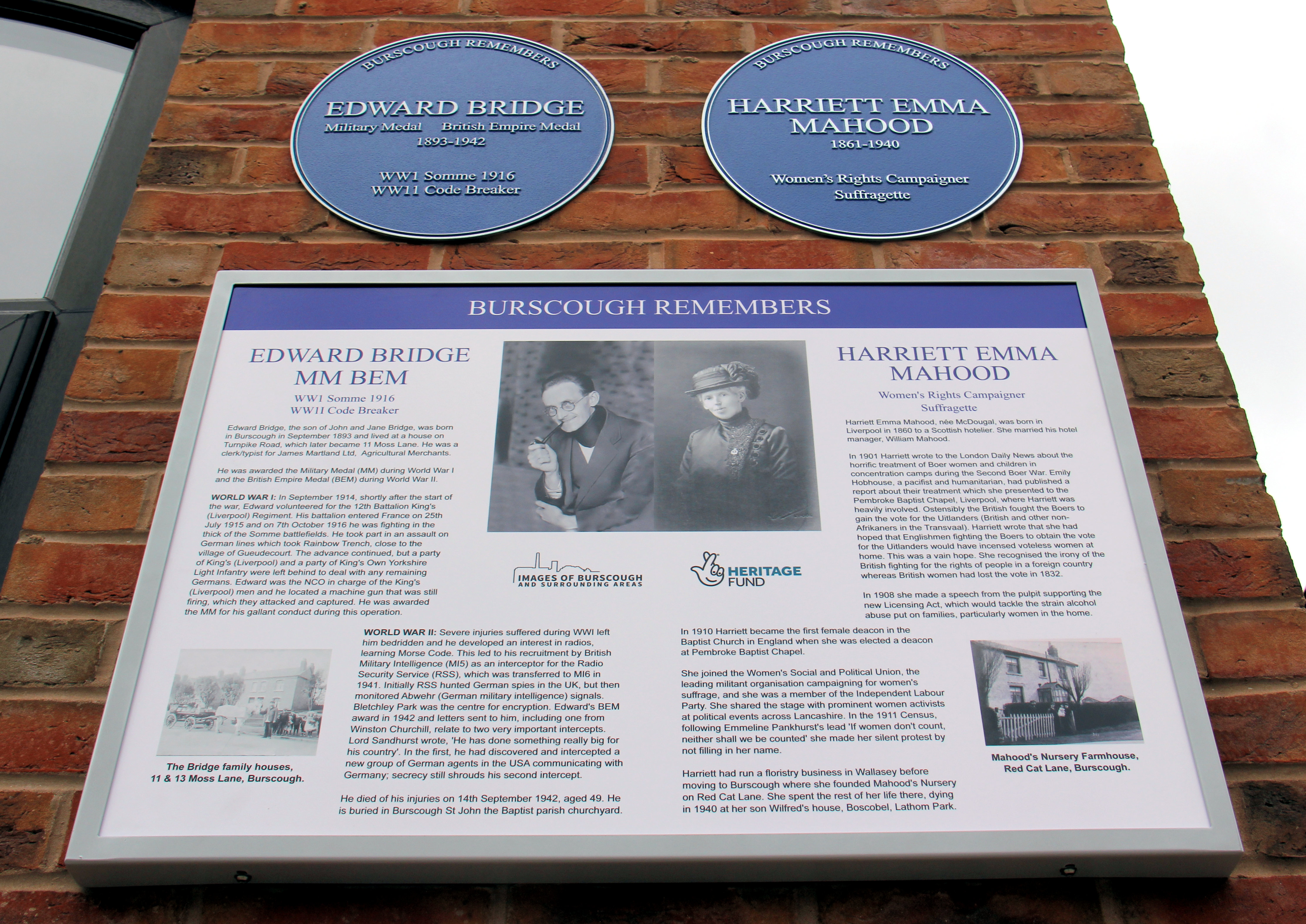
Blue Plaque for Harriet Emma Mahood by Images of Burscough; includes notice details and National Lottery Heritage Fund logo: original image by Michael Dawson

More permanently, a Blue Plaque has also been placed on a wall in Burscough in her honour; a video of its installation was made.

Mahood's name is also on the base of a statue dedicated to Mary Bamber and other local suffrage campaigners in Liverpool Museum.

A short film about Mahood, written and presented by Daniel Frampton, has been produced and can be viewed online.
