= Vic Fischer =

American politician (1924–2023)

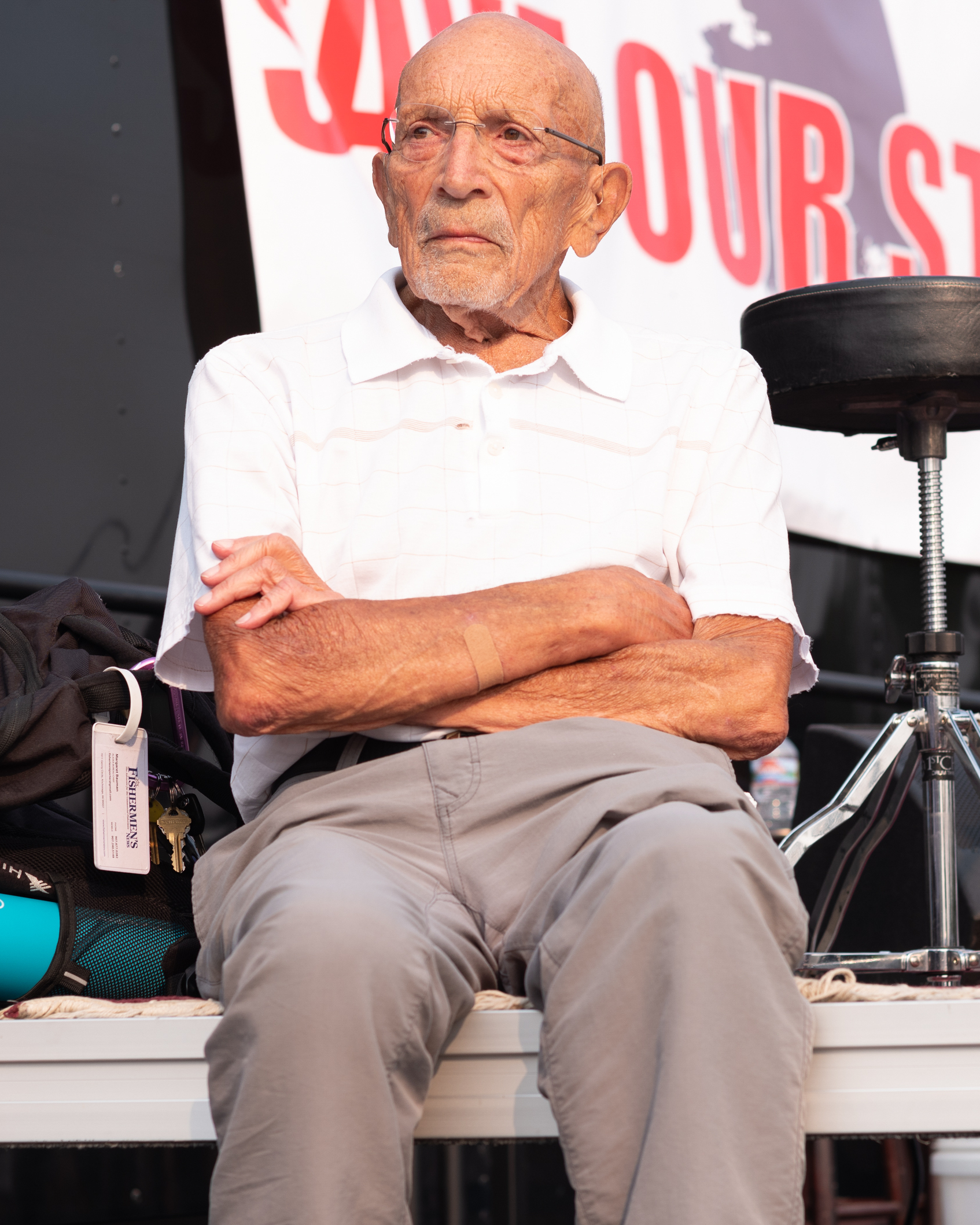
- Fischer in 2019

Member of the Alaska Senate
- In office January 3, 1981 – January 3, 1987
- Preceded by: Bill Sumner
- Succeeded by: Rick Uehling

Member of the Alaska Territorial Legislature from the 3rd district
- In office January 3, 1957 – January 3, 1959 Serving with Seaborn Buckalew, Ken Johnson, Irene Ryan, Russell Young, Dorothy Awes, Helen Fischer, Earl Hillstrand, Irwin Metcalf, James Norene
- Succeeded by: Legislature abolished

Delegate to the Alaska Constitutional Convention from the 18th district
- In office November 8, 1955 – February 5, 1956 Serving with Dorothy Awes, Seaborn Buckalew, William Egan, Helen Fischer, John Hellenthal, Victor Rivers, Edward Davis, Marvin Marston, George McLaughlin, Chris Poulsen, Barrie White

Planning Director of Anchorage
- In office 1950–1955

Personal details
- Born: May 2, 1924 Berlin, Brandenburg, Prussia, Germany
- Died: October 22, 2023 (aged 99) Anchorage, Alaska, U.S.
- Party: Democratic
- Spouse: Jane Angvik (m. 1981)
- Education: University of Wisconsin–Madison (BA); Massachusetts Institute of Technology (MCP); Harvard Kennedy School (MPA)

Victor Fischer (May 2, 1924 – October 22, 2023) was a German-born American politician from the state of Alaska. A member of the Democratic Party, he served as a delegate to the Constitutional Convention that drafted Alaska's constitution in 1955 and 1956. After the death of its Secretary Katie Hurley in 2021, Fischer was the last surviving participant in the constitutional convention. Fischer later served in the Alaska Senate, as president of the University of Alaska Institute of Social and Economic Research, and as assistant secretary of the Housing and Home Finance Agency.

== Political career ==
Fischer served as Anchorage's Planning Director from 1950 to 1955. Fischer was a vocal supporter of Alaskan statehood, serving as vice president of the pro-statehood group Operation Statehood. He was elected as a delegate to the Alaskan Constitutional Convention in 1955 and was the chair of the convention's Local Government Committee, which established the borough system. He was also elected to the final session of the Alaskan territorial legislature in 1956 and unsuccessfully sought a seat in the Alaska Senate in 1960.

Two years later, Fischer was appointed director of the Office of Metropolitan Development in the Housing and Home Finance Agency, serving in that role until 1966, when he became director of the University of Alaska Institute of Social and Economic Research. During his 10 years as director, Fischer secured funding for the Alaska Federation of Natives and helped write the environmental impact statement for the Trans-Alaska Pipeline.

Fischer returned to elected office in 1980 when he ran for and won a seat in the Alaska Senate, unseating incumbent Republican Bill Sumner. Fischer was re-elected in 1982 and 1984, but lost his seat to Republican Rick Uehling in 1986, after which he never ran for office again. A lifelong liberal activist, Fischer continued campaigning for Democratic candidates and causes until the end of his life; he was the co-chair of an unsuccessful attempt to recall Alaska governor Mike Dunleavy in 2019.

== Personal life ==
As a child, Fischer and his brother were shuffled between Germany and Russia, as his parents faced persecution under the Soviet Union; the family fled to the United States in 1939. In 2000, Fischer was granted Russian citizenship by Russian president Boris Yeltsin; he was encouraged to run for governor of Chukotka, the region of Russia directly across from Alaska across the Bering Strait, but declined to do so. Fischer was married to fellow politician Jane Angvik from 1981 until his death. They had one daughter, Ruth.

Fischer entered hospice care in 2023 due to poor health and died on October 22 of that year, aged 99.
