= Carrie Reichardt =

British artist

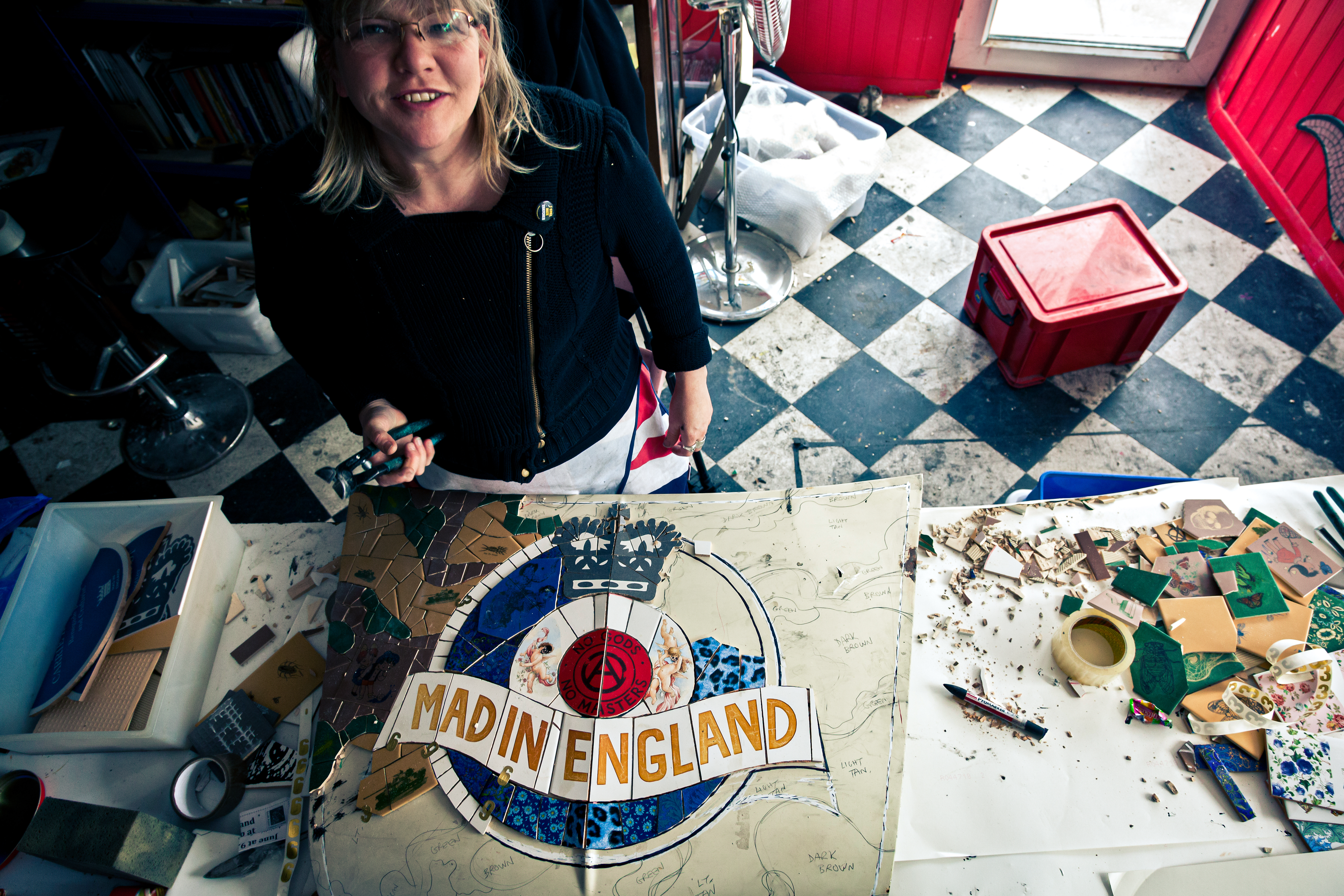
- Carrie Reichardt in her Studio
- Born: London, England
- Education: Kingston University (1987–88); BA - First Class, Fine Art, Leeds Metropolitan University (1988-1991); Ceramics classes, Richmond Adult Community College (2002-2010)
- Movement: Craftivism
- Children: 3
- Website: carriereichardt.com

Carrie Reichardt is a British artist known for her provocative protest art and collaborative large-scale pieces around systemic injustice and social activism.

A notable example of her mosaic style, The Treatment Rooms a.k.a. Mosaic House, is also Reichardt's home base and studio.

A member of the Craftivism movement, Reichardt uses murals, ceramics, screen-printing and graphic design in her work. She is an advocate of the movement and curated one of the few exclusively Craftivist exhibitions in the UK.

== Biography ==
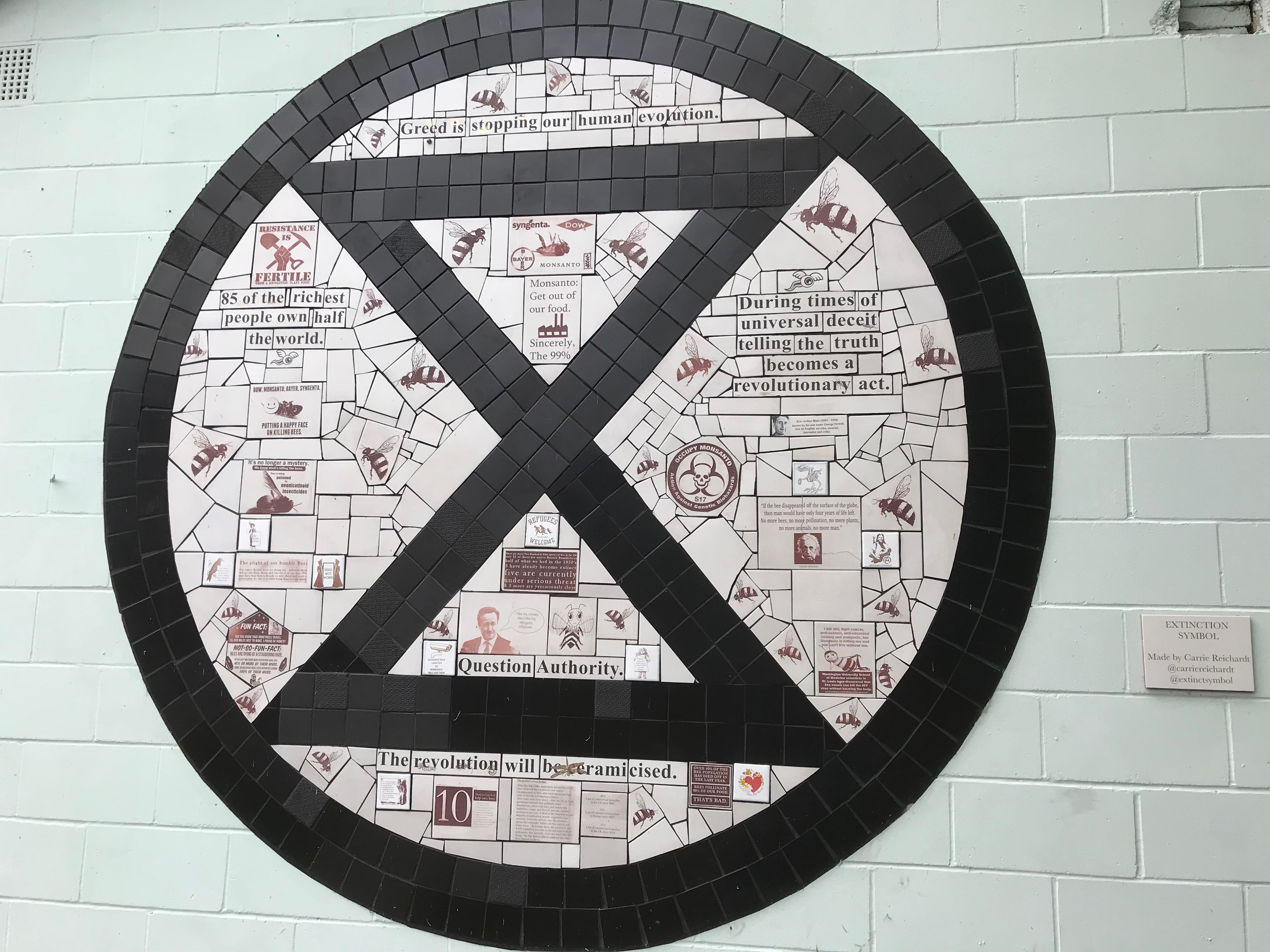
Bees by Carrie Reichardt.

Reichardt trained at Kingston University and received a degree in Fine Art from Leeds Metropolitan University. In 2009 she was invited to become Artist in Residence at Camberwell Art College as part of the Artists Access to Art Colleges programme.

She followed this by a period as Artist in Residence at the Single Homeless Project. She has exhibited at the Whitecross Street Party in Islington as part of her ongoing collaboration with the SHP.

Carrie Reichardt has spoken on the use of craft and art as protest, most recently for National Museums Liverpool’s International Women’s Day lectures in March 2012. She has also represented the UK as part of a group of international artists invited to mosaic the Argentinian Government building in Buenos Aires.

== Notable work ==
Reichardt is best known for her anarchic crockery, where vintage floral, kitsch, royal and religious crockery is given a new twist by re-firing with layers of new ceramic decals. They are modified in a "radical use of traditional things", along with skulls, cheeky slogans and political statements.

- The Tiki Love Truck – commissioned by ‘Walk the Plank’, specialists in outdoor performance. This mosaic-covered pick-up truck, was dedicated to the memory of a death-row inmate. Winning first prize at the inaugural parade in Manchester, the truck has since participated in the Illuminated Parade in Blackpool, and the Glowmobile Parade in Gateshead.
- Trojan Horse –a life-sized resin horse, with a skull for a face and coated in a mosaic ofinformation about the abuse of horses, made in collaboration with sculptor, Nick Reynolds. This protest against equestrian cruelty was displayed at the Cheltenham Festival Races, an event symbolic of the British establishment and an international centre of horse racing. The project was featured in The Guardian
- The London Elephant Parade 2010 – Carrie’s mosaic elephant, ‘Phoolan’, was part of the largest ever public art event – taking place outside London’s Natural History Museum
- The Milan Elephant Parade – this joint project with Reynolds was inspired by the revolutionary spirit spreading across the world and conveyed the message that ending capitalism is the only true way to save the elephant and the planet. The elephant was displayed outside the Triennale di Milano Museum of Art.
- Mary Bamber, a life-sized ceramic-adorned figure of the revolutionary socialist, Mary Bamber, now on permanent display at the Museum of Liverpool.

Carrie Reichardt’s work has featured in the press including, The Observer, The Guardian, The Evening Standard, Tile and Stone and in several books including; ‘1000 Ideas for Creative Reuse,’ Garth Johnson, ‘Mural Art No 2’, Kirikos Iosifidis and ‘The Idler 42 - Smash the System’ – Tom Hodgkinson.
