= Phyllis Le Cappelaine Burke =

Social reformer and housing commissioner (1900–1969)

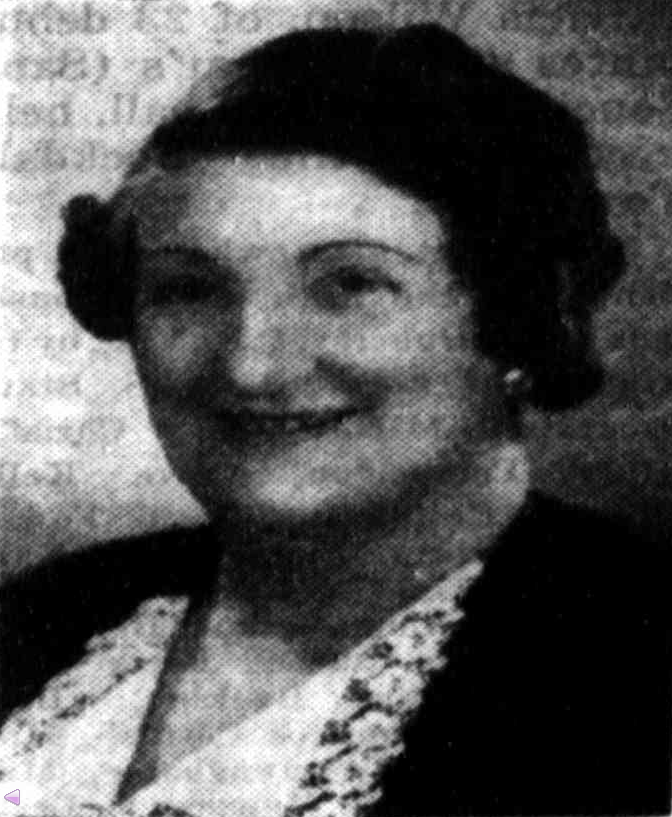
- Phyllis Le Cappelaine Burke in 1944 (from Catholic Weekly)
- Born: Phyllis Le Cappelaine Taylor; 27 January 1900; Maldon, Essex, England
- Died: 20 August 1969 (aged 69); Randwick, New South Wales, Australia
- Occupations: market researcher, social reformer
- Known for: founder of Catholic organization Altair, served on public commissions for housing, women's rights

Phyllis Le Cappelaine Burke (27 January 1900 – 20 August 1969), was an English-born Australian market researcher, housing commissioner, civic volunteer and philanthropist. She studied economics at the University of Sydney, graduating with a bachelor's degree in 1922. She served for twenty years on the Housing Commission of New South Wales, and supported numerous social reform causes through her voluntary activities. A devout Catholic, in 1943, she founded Altair, a discussion group for Catholic women who were University graduates. She was also a foundation member of the Sydney chapter of the St. Joan Social and Political Alliance.

== Personal life and education ==
Phyllis Le Cappelaine Taylor was born on 27 January 1900, in Maldon, Essex, England. Her parents, John Le Cappelaine Taylor (d. 1947) and Bridget Emily Taylor (née Dooley), emigrated to Australia when Phyllis was an infant.

As a young woman, Taylor attended a Catholic school for girls run by the Sisters of Mercy in North Sydney. The Monte Sant'Angelo Mercy College, as it was known, had been established in 1873. The girls were taught subjects as varied as English, history, geography, math, art, music and needlework. After graduating from secondary school, Taylor attended the University of Sydney, where she earned a Bachelor in Economics in 1922.

Taylor married John Murray Burke on 31 July 1922, in a ceremony held at St. Patrick's Cathedral in Sydney. John Murray Burke had served as a private in the infantry in the Australian armed forces during World War I. After the war, he worked as a mercer, selling silk and fabrics. The couple had nine children together.

== Career ==
Drawing on her economics training, Burke worked as a market researcher for various firms, conducting both political and commercial surveys. She was a long-time member of the Economics Society of Australia and New Zealand.

After Australia entered World War II, Burke took on several volunteer roles to support the war effort and related causes on the home front. The government renewed the national War Savings Campaign in an effort to encourage Australians to purchase war bonds to help the government raise funds. Burke was appointed as the women's organizer for the campaign in New South Wales. She travelled across the state, and spoke at various functions to encourage women's participation. She also contributed to public initiatives on curbing venereal disease among the military, considering it a public health threat to women. She was later appointed to the Commission of the Peace for New South Wales in 1944.

In 1945, she joined the Housing Commission of New South Wales, and continued on this commission for twenty years, retiring in 1965. The Housing Commission had been established in 1941, as a reorganization of an earlier Housing Improvement Board. It was tasked with ensuring that public housing was "adequate" and available on "reasonable terms or at reasonable rentals." The Commission worked to expand and improve the quality of public housing. As a Commissioner, Burke urged consideration of women's needs and perspectives in the development and implementation of housing projects. She lobbied for more modern designs in public housing to reduce time needed for homemaking.

Burke was active in a variety of women's organizations. In addition to Catholic women's organizations, she joined the National Council of Women of New South Wales, and was a member of the women's group Soroptimist, as well as the Business and Professional Women's Club of Sydney. She contributed articles for the magazine Australian Women's Digest, addressing contemporary housing issues. In 1945, she served on the Australian Broadcasting Company's advisory committee on women's programming.

Burke was strongly anti-communist, and was wary of Jessie Street's leadership of the United Associations of Women; while she attended some of their public lectures, she chose not to become a member. Street was a left-leaning feminist who was Australia's first woman delegate to the UN. She held sympathetic views of the Soviet Union; although she did not espouse openly communist views, she was a socialist and a leader in the labour movement.

Burke was skilled at raising funds for charitable organizations and humanitarian efforts. She was in charge of promoting the 1946 UN appeal in NSW, raising funds to help refugees and communities recovering from the ravages of World War II. She later served a similar role for the United Nations' appeal for children. Responding to the needs of children was a particular focus of her philanthropic work; she supported organizations such as The Smith Family, an educational charity that helped disadvantaged children, and the New South Wales Society for Crippled Children, which aided children affected by polio. She also advocated for increased governmental support for large families, to reduce poverty. Burke also raised funds for the Australian Red Cross and the Royal Society for the Blind.

=== Catholic women's organizations ===
A devout Catholic, Burke believed that Catholic women had a role to play in the public sphere, as well as in the home and family. She established a discussion group for university-educated Catholic lay women in New South Wales in 1943, called Altair. Other notable members included Mary Tenison Woods, the first woman lawyer to be admitted to the bar in Australia, Norma Parker, one of the first social workers in Australia, and Jean Daly, a women's rights activist who later represented Australia on the UN Commission on the Status of Women. After the 1944 Social Justice Statement was published by the Australian Catholic Bishops Conference, the members of Altair expressed their concern that the Bishops' statement did not reflect a broad enough view of women's role in society. A Social Justice Statement has been issued annually by the bishops every year since 1940, to coincide with a Social Justice Sunday. Their letter to the bishops went unanswered.

Wishing to be connected to a wider movement among Catholic women, the Altair members, led by Tenison Woods and Parker, founded the Sydney chapter of the St. Joan Social and Political Alliance, which launched in 1945. Burke was a foundation member and served on committees with the organization. Founded in 1911 in England as the Catholic Women's Suffrage Society, the international organization was renamed the St. Joan Social and Political Alliance in 1923. The organization advocated for equal rights for men and women, including the ordination of women, and encouraged Catholic women's participation in civic life and in social reform movements.

Norman Gilroy, then the Archbishop of Sydney, opposed the new chapter of the St. Joan's Alliance, and made it clear that he would disapprove of Catholic women in his diocese joining the group. To minimize their exposure, he prevented information and advertisements about the group from being included in the regional Catholic newspaper, the Catholic Weekly.

Many of the women in the Sydney chapter of St Joan Social and Political Alliance were interested in international affairs and, like Burke, supported the work of the United Nations.

== Death and legacy ==
Burke died at age 69 on 20 August 1969, in Randwick, New South Wales. She is buried at Waverley Cemetery. Her husband survived her, as did all her nine children.

In 1968, Phyllis Burke Court was opened in Artarmon, a suburb of Sydney. It was named by the Housing Commission in her honour.

== See also ==
- Public housing in Australia
- Women in the Catholic Church
- Catholic Church in Australia
