= Dorothy Awes Haaland =

American lawyer and politician

- Born: Dorothy Awes; October 3, 1918; Moorhead, Minnesota, U.S.
- Died: February 23, 1996 (aged 77); Kirkland, Washington, U.S.
- Occupation: Lawyer

Dorothy Awes Haaland (October 3, 1918 – February 23, 1996 ) was an American lawyer and politician. She served in the final Alaska Territorial Legislature when Alaska was still the Territory of Alaska. In 2009, she was added to the Alaska Women's Hall of Fame. She was one of the first woman to be admitted to the Alaska Bar Association.

== Early life and education ==
Dorothy Awes was born in 1918 in Moorhead, Minnesota. She attended the University of Iowa College of Law and received her degree from there. In 1945, she moved to Alaska, when she was working for the Office of Price Administration.

== Career ==
In 1946, she started working in Cordova, Alaska as Justice of the Peace and a commissioner. She served in that position until 1948. She relocated to Anchorage, Alaska and ran a law firm from 1950 until 1955. That year, she served as a delegate at the Alaska Constitutional Convention, alongside Helen Fischer.

In 1956, she married Ragnar Haaland. In 1957 she served one term in, and the final year of, the Alaska Territorial Legislature. She became assistant Alaska Attorney General in 1960. She retired in 1976. Haaland co-founded the National Organization for Women chapter in Anchorage. She served on the board of the Women's Resource Center and was president of St. Joan's International Alliance.

== Later life and legacy ==
Haaland recorded an oral history regarding Alaska statehood in 1981. It resides in the University of Alaska Fairbanks. In 1984, she was honored alongside Alaska statehood founders, including Robert Atwood, and fellow delegates at the University of Alaska Fairbanks. Around 1994, she suffered a stroke and moved to Bothell, Washington, to live with her son. She died at a hospital in Kirkland, Washington, on March 1, 1996.

In 2009, Haaland was placed in the Alaska Women's Hall of Fame.

== See also ==
- List of first women lawyers and judges in Alaska
