= Leonora de Alberti =

English historian and suffragist (1870 – 1934)

- Born: 1870; Marylebone, London, England
- Died: 1934 (aged 63–64)
- Occupations: Historian, translator and suffragist
- Employer(s): Public Record Office; The Catholic Suffragist
- Organization(s): Catholic Women's Suffrage Society; League of Nations

Leonora de Alberti (1870–1934) was an English-born historian, translator and suffragist. As well as writing on Spanish history and producing a Spanish-English and a Portuguese-English dictionary, she edited the journal of the Catholic Women’s Suffrage Society (later St Joan's International Alliance).

== Early life and family ==
Alberti was born in Marylebone, London, the seventh of ten children of Eugenio de Alberti and his wife, French-born Amalia de Acuñaga, who had moved to London in 1866. Her sister Amalia de Alberti was a journalist and translator whose main achievement was a three-volume translation of Romain Rolland’s L’Ame enchantée.

== History and language publications ==
In 1909, Alberti collaborated with economic historian Annie Wallis Chapman on a paper for the Royal Historical Society on English traders and the Spanish Inquisition, which became the book English Merchants and the Spanish Inquisition in the Canaries in 1919. By this time she had worked as an editor for the Camden Society.

Alberti produced Spanish-English and Portuguese-English pocket dictionaries for Hill in 1919 and 1920.

In 1925, Alberti assisted with translation for Lucien Wolf's Jews in the Canary Islands.

== Suffragism ==
In 1913, partly in reaction to what she perceived as the too moderate views of other Catholic suffragists like Margaret Fletcher, Alberti published a pamphlet, Woman Suffrage and Pious Opponents, arguing that Catholic women did not need to oppose women’s suffrage on pious grounds.

From 1915, while working part-time at the Public Record Office, Alberti belonged to the Catholic Women’s Suffrage Society and was the inaugural editor of its journal The Catholic Suffragist. Women’s suffrage was the main focus of the journal, but Leonora also wrote articles against laws which discriminated against women and reactions to sexist publications.

In the 1920s, Alberti served as honorary secretary for the Council for the Representation of Women in the League of Nations.
