= Mary Tenison Woods =

Australian lawyer and social activist (1893–1971)

Mary Tenison Woods CBE
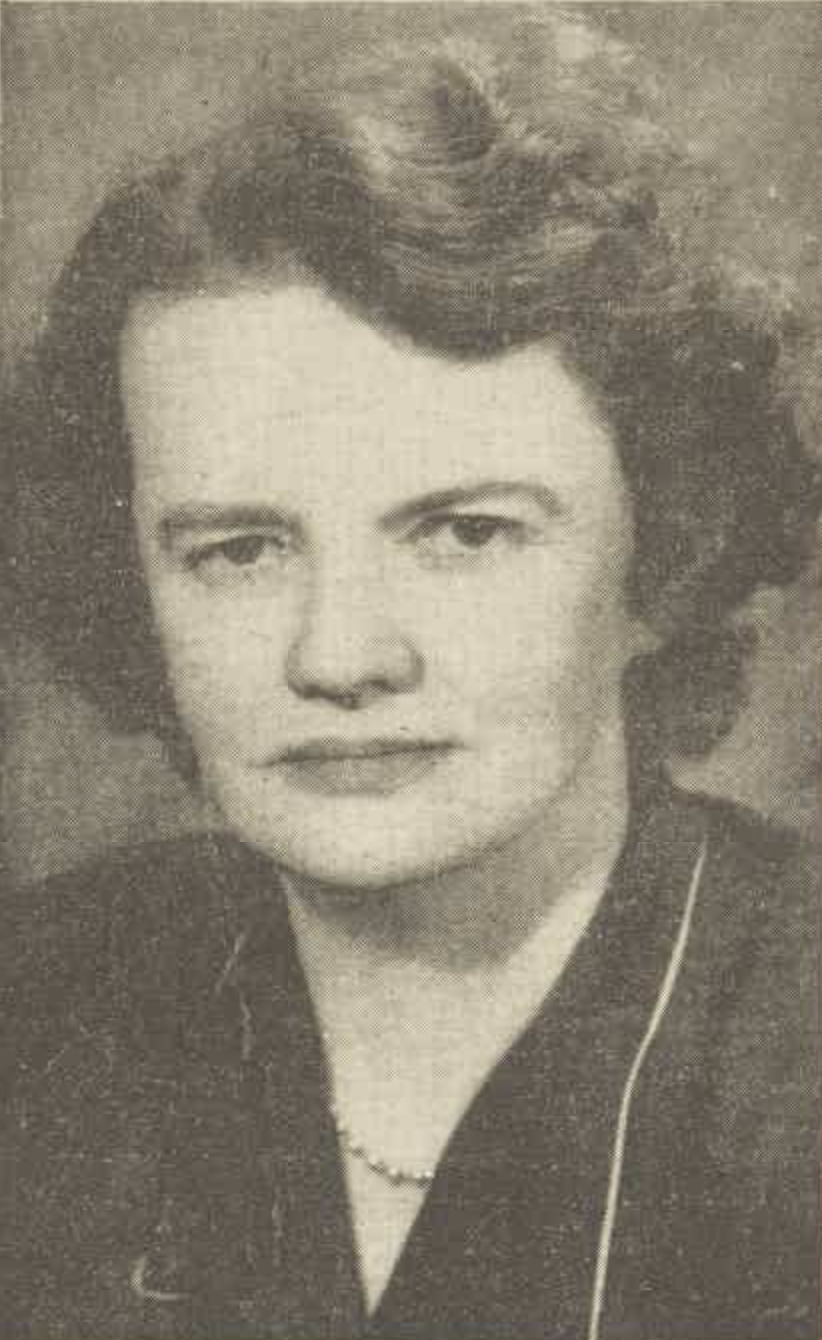
- Mary Tenison Woods in 1950
- Born: Mary Cecil Kitson; 9 December 1893; Caltowie, South Australia
- Died: 18 October 1971 (aged 77); Ryde, New South Wales
- Education: LLB, University of Adelaide (1916)
- Occupations: Lawyer, social activist
- Known for: First woman to be admitted to practice law in South Australia
- Spouse: Gordon Tenison Woods (m. 1924; div. 1933)

Mary Cecil Tenison Woods (née Kitson) CBE (9 December 1893 – 18 October 1971) was a South Australian lawyer and social activist. She was the first female lawyer and public notary in South Australia. She wrote nine legal textbooks and from 1950 until 1959 served as Chief of the United Nations Commission on the Status of Women. She was an early advocate for child welfare and juvenile justice in Australia.

== Early life and education ==
Mary Cecil Kitson was born on 9 December 1893, the fourth of seven children to John Kitson, a police officer, and Mary Agnes McClure, in the Mid North South Australian town of Caltowie. They moved to Adelaide, where John was a Detective Inspector, and Mary and her sister attended St Aloysius College, where she was head prefect and dux.

The University of Adelaide had been open to female students since the 1880s, but few women studied law as they could not practice. Tenison Woods was one of the first, beginning her degree in 1912, and the first South Australian woman to graduate with a Bachelor of Laws in 1916.

== Career ==
=== Legal practice ===
Tenison Woods was the first woman admitted to practice law in South Australia on 20 October 1917, after the passing of the Female Law Practitioners Act of 1911. After completing her articles with Poole and Johnstone in 1917, she was named managing clerk of the firm. Thomas Slaney Poole had been one of her University lecturers and was soon after promoted to the Supreme Court. In 1919, she became a partner, with the firm changing its name to Johnstone, Ronald and Kitson. Her brother, Augustine, was articled to the firm. It was seen as appropriate for Tenison Woods to work on court cases with children involved, although at the time there were no separate courts or differentiation of charges for children. She later said, "I was shocked at what I saw ... frightened little children were treated as adult criminals, being called on to plead guilty or not before His Sovereign Majesty, and so forth. I got interested in child welfare right away, and that interest increased with the years."

In 1921, Tenison Woods applied to become a public notary, a role that had been restricted to men. This led to debate around the meaning of the word 'person' in the relevant Act, which Poole, hearing her application, declared to mean 'man'. Supporters, including Edward Charles Stirling who had introduced women's suffrage into the South Australian parliament, encouraged parliament to pass the Sex Disqualification (Removal) Act in 1921, allowing Woods to be appointed to the office.

After her marriage in 1924, Tenison Woods was no longer allowed to remain in the partnership. She and recent graduate Dorothy Somerville then formed the first Australian law firm composed solely of female partners, called Kitson & Somerville. After her husband's disbarring and abandonment of her in 1927, Tenison Woods left the firm to join Bennett, Campbell, Browne and Atkinson in 1928, where she was able to ensure a more secure income.

=== Research and writing ===
Tenison Woods received a grant from the Carnegie Corporation to study delinquency in South Australia. Her research led to the establishment of a Children's Court with a specially appointed magistrate. She published her first book, Juvenile Delinquent, in 1925.

After her divorce, Tenison Woods moved to Sydney in 1933, where she worked as a legal editor for Butterworths. She wrote seven legal textbooks including War Damage Legislation, Ex-Servicemen's Legislation, and Landlord Tenant and Land Sales Legislation. She also wrote a book of anecdotes with Marjorie Robertson titled Leaves From a Woman Lawyer's Notebook.

From 1935 to 1940, Tenison Woods taught on the legal aspects of social work at Sydney University and was a member of the University Board of Social Study and Training. She was appointed Chair of the Delinquency Committee of the Child Welfare Council of NSW. During World War II, she was on the board of the Women's Australian National Services.

In 1942, Tenison Woods received funding from the Children's Advisory Council, the Australian Council for Educational Research and the Australian Trained Social Workers' Association to undertake a comparative study of British child welfare policies and practices. After her return, as Chair of the Children's Advisory Council, she urged the Minister for Education, Clive Evatt to undertake reform of the entire NSW welfare system. When no action was taken, she wrote two articles for the Sydney Morning Herald in 1944 highlighting problems at the Parramatta Girls Home and the Gosford Farm Home for Boys, which were influential in leading to the creation of a separate Department of Child Welfare.

In 1945, Tenison Woods was invited to speak at an International Labour Organization conference in Montreal, but did not receive a permit to travel from the Department of External Affairs in time to attend. In 1946, she travelled to London and met with women pioneers in a number of fields, reporting to the BBC and the ABC on her meetings. In 1947, she was guest speaker at the first Australian Conference of Social Work.

=== Advocacy for women ===
Alongside Jean Daly, Phyllis Burke and others, Tenison Woods formed a group called "Altair" in 1944, with the object of monitoring public officials and convincing legislators and church officials to include women's views on political and social issues. They were supported by Archbishop Norman Thomas Gilroy, however he did not support their decision in 1946 to form a NSW section of the St Joan's Social and Political Alliance. Gilroy forbade members of the Legion of Catholic Women from joining. The group had consultative status at the United Nations, and in 1950, Tenison Woods was nominated to become a member of the Status of Women office.

Tenison Woods was appointed chief of the Status of Women Commission in 1951 and moved to New York City. She stayed in the role until 1958, working with women lawyers across Europe and Asia, providing information and support on women's rights issues. During her term the Convention on the Political Rights of Women and the Convention on the Nationality of Married Women were adopted.

=== Later life ===
Tenison Woods returned to Australia in 1959. She wrote two further textbooks for Butterworths. She was Honorary Solicitor to the SA Women's Hockey Association from 1925 until 1971 and to the Australian Croquet Council from 1925 until 1971. She was a foundation member and later life member of the Lyceum Club in Adelaide. When Roma Mitchell was appointed Australia's first female QC in 1962, Woods sent her a congratulatory telegram saying "you are indeed making history."

== Honours ==
The Law Society of South Australia called Tenison Woods an "authoritative and widely published voice" on child welfare and an advocate for the advancement of women. She was awarded an OBE in 1950 and a CBE in 1958 for her child welfare work. There is a Mary Kitson Street in Watson, ACT named after her.

== Personal life ==
Tenison Woods married lawyer Gordon Tenison Woods at St Laurence's Church, North Adelaide, on 13 December 1924. He was a great-nephew to Julian Tenison-Woods, was two years younger than Mary, and had been an editor of the Adelaide University magazine alongside her. In 1926, he was struck off the roll of legal practitioners for misuse of trust funds. One of the complainants was his father. He then abandoned Tenison Woods and their son, who had cerebral palsy, moving to New Zealand. She obtained a divorce in 1933, and moved with her son to Sydney.

Tenison Woods retired to Sydney and died in Ryde, New South Wales on 18 October 1971.
