= Patricia Woodlock =

British suffragette (born c. 1873)

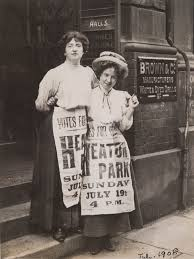
- on the left (Mabel Capper is on the right)
- Born: Mary Winifred Woodlock; 25 October 1873; Liverpool, England
- Died: 1961 (aged 87); Wandsworth, London, England
- Occupations: Artist and suffragette
- Known for: Suffragette activism and hunger strike
- Movement: Women's Social and Political Union, Catholic Women's Suffrage Society
- Awards: Hunger Strike Medal for Valour

Patricia Woodlock (born Mary Winifred Woodlock; 25 October 1873 – 1961) was a British artist and suffragette who was imprisoned seven times, including serving the longest suffragette prison sentence in 1908 (solitary confinement for three months); she was awarded a Women's Social and Political Union (WSPU) Hunger Strike Medal for Valour. Her harsh sentence caused outrage among supporters and inspired others to join the protests. Her release was celebrated in Liverpool and London and drawn as a dreadnought warship, on the cover of the WSPU Votes for Women newspaper.

== Early life ==
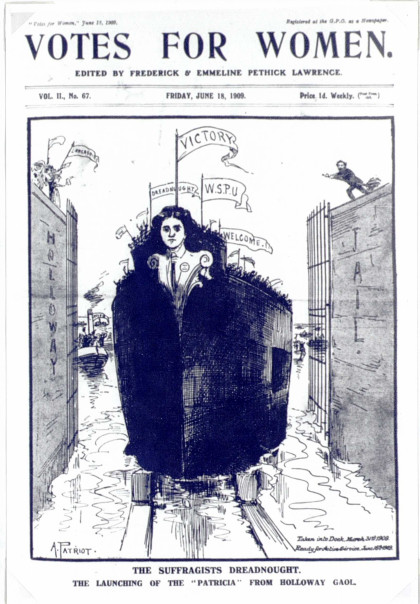
Woodlock as a Dreadnought on the cover of Votes for Women

She was born Mary Winifred Woodlock in 1873 to an Irish socialist father David Woodlock, originally from Tipperary, who was also an artist, and his wife, Mary Teresa (née Martin). Known as "Patricia", she had three younger siblings: a decade younger sister, Evangeline; an eight years younger brother, Charles; and a two years younger brother, David Sarsfield Woodlock. Charles Woodlock reportedly became a Jesuit priest. Patricia was educated at Mount Vernon Convent. Woodlock became a member of the Independent Labour Party.

Her family home was 46 Nicander Road, Sefton Park. At the time of her arrest in 1907 she lived at 2 South John Street, and later at 27 South Humber Street, Liverpool.

== Suffragette activism ==
In 1906, Woodlock was a founder member with Alice Morrissey, of the first Women's Social and Political Union (WSPU) branch in Liverpool. She became a Liverpool WSPU organiser in 1909.

Woodlock was also associated with the Catholic Women's Suffrage Society, and with local women's church suffrage groups were able to cross the religious divide of the time, although the local press prioritised news on women engaging in violent sectarian protests.

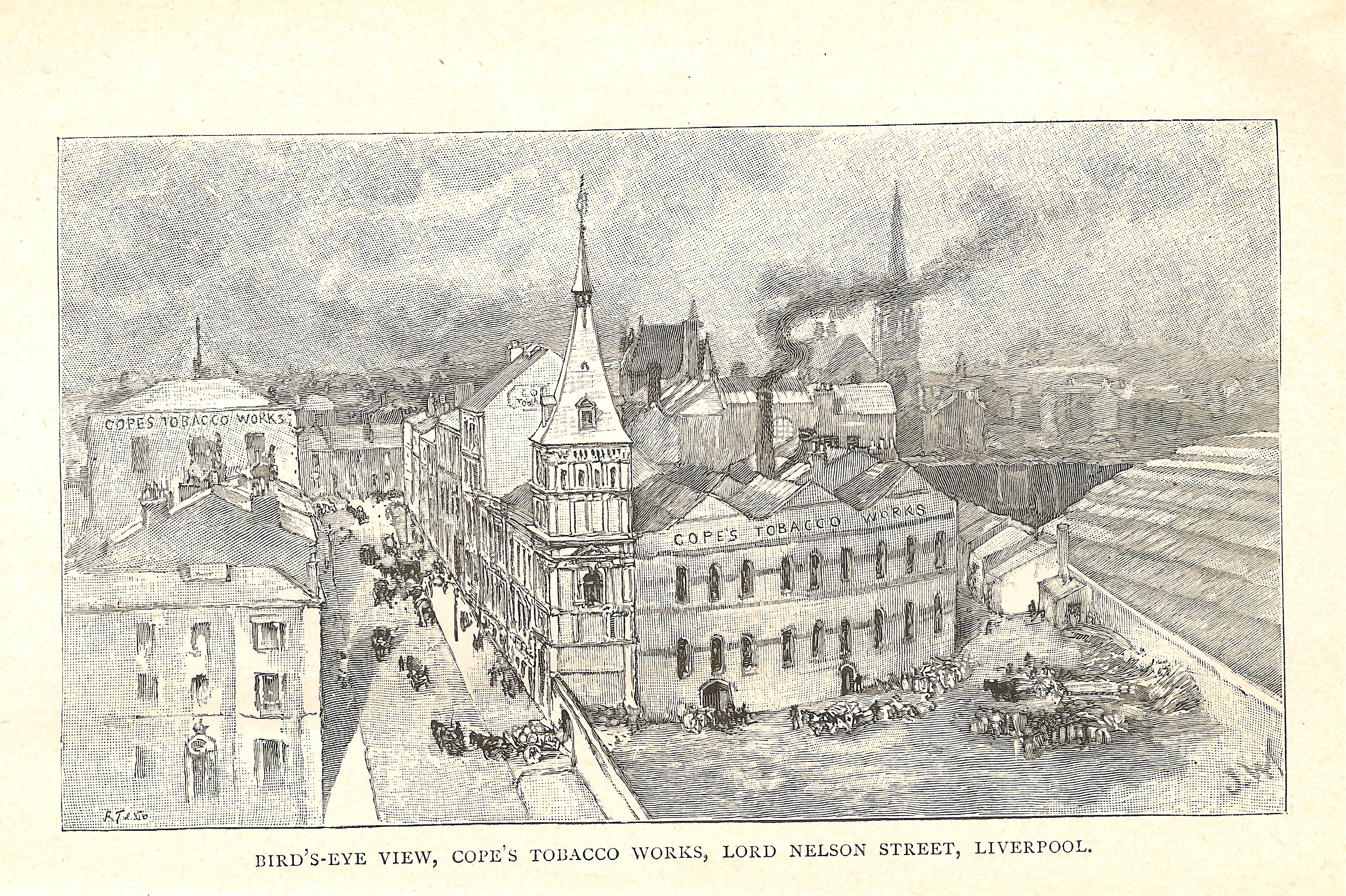
Cope's Tobacco Works, Nelson Street, Liverpool

In Summer 1907, and again in September, Woodlock, Hillier and Morrissey held weekly meetings at a house in Colquitt Street, outdoor meetings at well-known socialist venues, Wellington Column and Islington Square, and lunchtime factory-gate meetings where many women worked, including Cope's tobacco and Crawford's Biscuits. Annie Kenney, a working-class suffragette leader, came to speak. Open-air meetings after working hours were held more than once a week eventually, and one event in 1908 had over 1,000 attending. Some spontaneous support from working-class men arose, for example, when Woodlock and others were being arrested while protesting at David Lloyd George's appearance in Sun Hall, Kensington, Liverpool. An "obvious foreigner", according to Liverpool Weekly Mercury, a Mr Salinger was remanded in court after having been arrested for interfering with the police on behalf of the women but he was then released.

Woodlock was arrested and imprisoned twice, once serving 14 days, before being sentenced to one month imprisonment for protesting in Parliament Square, London in 1907, with Aeta Lamb and Emma Sproson. The event was reported widely, including the Evening Express listing the names of 62 women who were arrested. At her trial, Woodlock said it was 'an honour for me to go to prison on behalf of my sisters.' Woodlock was described as "diehard" and one of "the most unruly and turbulent of spirits". A WSPU celebration meal for Woodlock and others released was held at the Holborn Restaurant, with a menu of seven courses.

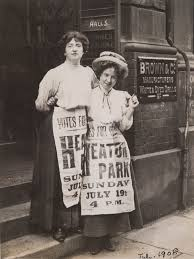
Woodlock (left) and Mabel Capper advertising WSPU event

Woodlock took part in women's suffrage publicity and protest events, such as advertising for rallies in Heaton Park, Manchester on 11 and 19 July 1908 by dressing as human advertising boards with Mabel Capper and attempting to enter the male-dominated Manchester Royal Exchange. The July park events were well supported and altogether attracted 60,000 attendees. These gatherings got favourable or neutral treatment in the press news pages but no mention in the more specific 'women's' pages at the time. In February 1909, Woodlock was a "group captain" of those who organised a large suffrage event in the Sun Hall, when Christabel Pankhurst spoke. In March 1909, Woodlock, with Alice Burton, Bessie Morris, Ada Broughton, and Cecilia Hilton, was one of the Liverpool delegates to the "Women's Parliament" in Caxton Hall, London, volunteering after hearing Emmeline Pankhurst speaking to the branch in Liverpool.

Woodlock's prison sentences that year included the longest given to a suffragette (three months solitary) at the time, as a persistent offender, for obstruction offences at the protest on the visit of the Prime Minister, H. H. Asquith to Birmingham in September 1909.

Woodlock, with Mary Leigh and Charlie Marsh, were force-fed on hunger strike in the Winson Green prison. Woodlock was visited by Emmeline Pethick-Lawrence, after some weeks of solitary confinement, and Pethick-Lawrence wrote in Votes for Women, that she found Woodlock smiling and at peace. Comparing Woodlock's demeanour to a lively women's gathering at an ice-rink, Pethick-Lawrence said that Woodlock was 'the heart of our Movement,... the centre, the pivot upon which every part of it turns. Woodlock was visited and encouraged by Christabel Pankhurst.

Support for Woodlock and outrage at her sentence locally in Liverpool, pushed the sales of Votes for Women up to 700 copies in one week. In support of Woodlock, Mary Phillips hid overnight under the Liverpool St. George's Hall stage where honorary degrees were to be awarded to two Cabinet Ministers the next day. Phillips jumped out and shouted 'Votes for Women' and an objection to Woodlock's imprisonment. This action was welcomed by Christabel Pankhurst as a 'splendid protest' showing ' pluck and ingenuity'. Elsie Howie, Jessie Kenney and Vera Wentworth, pursued the Prime Minister H. H. Asquith on holiday in Devon asking why he was able to be on holiday whilst Woodlock was still in prison, on a 'monstrous sentence'. The women chased him at the golf course and also decorated his Clovelly Court rhododendron bushes and garden with circular green, white and purple cards saying 'Release Patricia Woodlock' and various other suffragette materials.

To mark Woodlock's eventual release, Christabel Pankhurst wrote an article for the 14 June 1909 WSPU newspaper 'Votes for Women', showing Woodlock as a battleship dreadnought and saying she was

'..one of those who are the great strength of the women's movement, for she is fearless, loyal and unselfish, ready to do the smallest or greatest service, as a speaker and above all as a fighter.'

When the 'Liverpool Prisoners' were released there was a WSPU celebration, headed up by Emmeline Pankhurst at the Royal Albert Hall. Woodlock was praised over and over again in a speech by Pankhurst for having 'taken a place in the front line of fighting' and that she (Pankhurst) had been inspired by Woodlock's resolve in solitary confinement. Pankhurst had Woodlock beside her in an open carriage procession to and from the venue. Woodlock was given silver Holloway brooch, and a Hunger Strike Medal 'for Valour', an illuminated scroll and was called a 'brave pioneer'.

There was a further reception on the prisoners' return to Liverpool, led by Bertha Elam, a new WSPU member, who was said to be directly inspired to join the suffrage movement, by Woodlock. Emmeline Pankhurst travelled from London to attend that event with Woodlock and the WSPU fife and drum band who were playing to welcome the released women at a public celebration event.

In September 1909, Woodlock was arrested again, for hurling roof slates at Prime Minister Asquith as he attended an all-male budget event in Birmingham. Woodlock, Evaline Hilda Burkitt, Mabel Capper, Mary Leigh, Charlotte (Charlie) Marsh, Laura Ainsworth and Ellen Barnswell were all singing protests loudly in transit and on arrival at prison, refusing to undress to wear prison clothes, and were demanding to be treated as 'political' prisoners in what was known as the 'First Division'.

In November 1909, after release, Woodlock and Laura Ainsworth approached the prison doctor, Dr. Ernest Helby, in the street. He had force-fed Woodlock and others and the two women demanded the immediate release of fellow suffragette Charlie Marsh. Later that day Dr. Helby's windows were smashed, but no legal action was taken for the incident and Marsh was quietly released later.

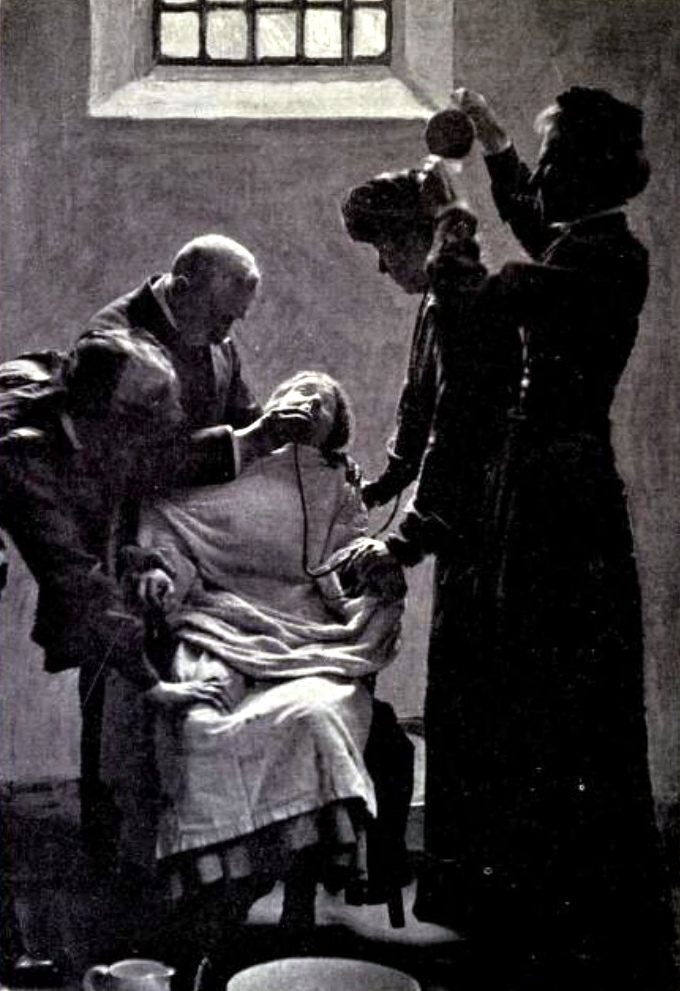
Force feeding of suffragettes on hunger strike

After the police aggression and brutal violence against the suffragette crowd in London in November 1910, known as 'Black Friday', Woodlock, was arrested with other protestors, who were all released without charge, and she no longer took part in further physical or militant protests.

== WSPU leadership ==
When Ada Flatman became the Liverpool WSPU paid organiser, she asked Woodlock to take responsibility for the stocking and setting up the new WSPU shop, whilst she was away. It proved a useful development with 50 new members one month and profits of £120 from sales during April–November 1909. However, there were disagreements on priorities for branch activities such as street meetings for working women, or more 'At Homes' among the wealthier women, which were by invitation, but helped fundraising.

Woodlock continued to speak at many suffrage events and was described as a brilliant speaker. She was chosen as one of the leaders addressing the crowds at the women's Hyde Park Rally in 1910. She took over as temporary organiser of the Liverpool WSPU branch, joined by Ada Broughton and Helah Criddle, after a downturn in WSPU activity and income, when the shop had closed and Alice Davies, current organiser was in prison. It was to reopen in 1912 under Helen Jollie's more successful approach to organising the fundraising campaign.

A postcard of Woodlock signed 21 November 1910 was produced by WSPU headquarters.

In 1910, Woodlock and Ada Flatman and Jennie Baines were main speakers at a Liverpool event for 'Jane Warton' – who was WSPU leader Lady Constance Lytton in disguise – her aim was to experience arrest, hunger strike and force-feeding (as an ordinary working woman). That event was attended by 300 men and women, who processed on to the Prison Governor's house to call for 'Liverpool to be the first 'to wipe out the stain' of force-feeding.

On the night of the 1911 Census, Woodlock was at her family home at 46 Nicander Road, Setton Park in Liverpool, but was not 'absent' from the census list like others who protested this way, perhaps because her father completed it. In 1912, local suffragette and physician Alice Ker wrote to her two daughters encouraging them to go to Woodlock at the WSPU offices and to offer their help to the cause.

Woodlock was imprisoned seven times and awarded a WSPU Hunger Strike Medal for Valour. Like all suffragette prisoners, she was given amnesty by the Home Secretary at the outbreak of the First World War, when WSPU stood down its militancy actions.

== Later life ==
Woodlock was still living in Liverpool in 1930, but seems to have had no further involvement in leading women's rights movements, apart from maintaining a membership of the Liverpool branch of the United Suffragists, with Alice Ker and Isabel Buxton. Woodlock also joined the Votes for Women Fellowship, led by the Pethick-Lawrences, and subscribed to The Catholic Suffragist before and after the First World War began. Catholic Women's Suffragist Societies offered relief work and philosophical and feminist speakers as a social and educational twice-weekly club with entertainment and mutual support for women affected by the war, but there is no record of Woodlock addressing these groups.

Woodlock died, aged 87, in Wandsworth, South London in 1961.

== Further information ==
In 1909, the WSPU rented a houseboat named in Woodlock's honour. The boat flew the suffragette colours of purple and green and was moored near the Henley Regatta course.
