= Jessie Stephenson =

British suffragette (1873–1966)

- Born: Sara Jessie Stephenson; 1873; Louth, Lincolnshire
- Died: 1976 (aged 102–103); Cromer, Norfolk
- Occupation: suffragette
- Organization: Women's Social and Political Union
- Known for: suffragette activism including 1911 census boycott

Sara Jessie Stephenson (1873–1966) was a British suffragette and a member of the WSPU who organised census boycott in Manchester.

== Early life ==
Sara Jessie Stephenson was born in Louth, Lincolnshire in 1873 the daughter of a farmer in Lincolnshire, England.

Despite her parents' initial reluctance, she wanted more than a domestic life and travelled in France and Germany teaching English.

== Suffragette activism ==
Stephenson joined the Women's Social and Political Union (WSPU), and donated some of her earnings from teaching to their cause, before returning to work in London for a barrister. She lived in rooms at the Twentieth Century Club at Notting Hill, as did fellow activist Ada Flatman.

Stephenson became actively involved in 1907, cycling around during her holiday with a banner 'Keep the Liberal Out' and 'Votes For Women', annoying a local minister and schoolteacher. This was in support of the WSPU in the Jarrow by-election with Christabel Pankhurst, Nellie Martel and Mary Gawthorpe. On return, her employer called her "one of the shreiking sisterhood".

A year later Stephenson was a chief marshal for the Paddington section of the women's large Hyde Park march (known as "Women's Sunday") and a main speaker (on platform 20) at that event, wearing white and a sash in the WSPU colours of purple, white, green. She took note on arriving of 'rough' men threatening concealed missiles or to set off bells to disrupt the event.

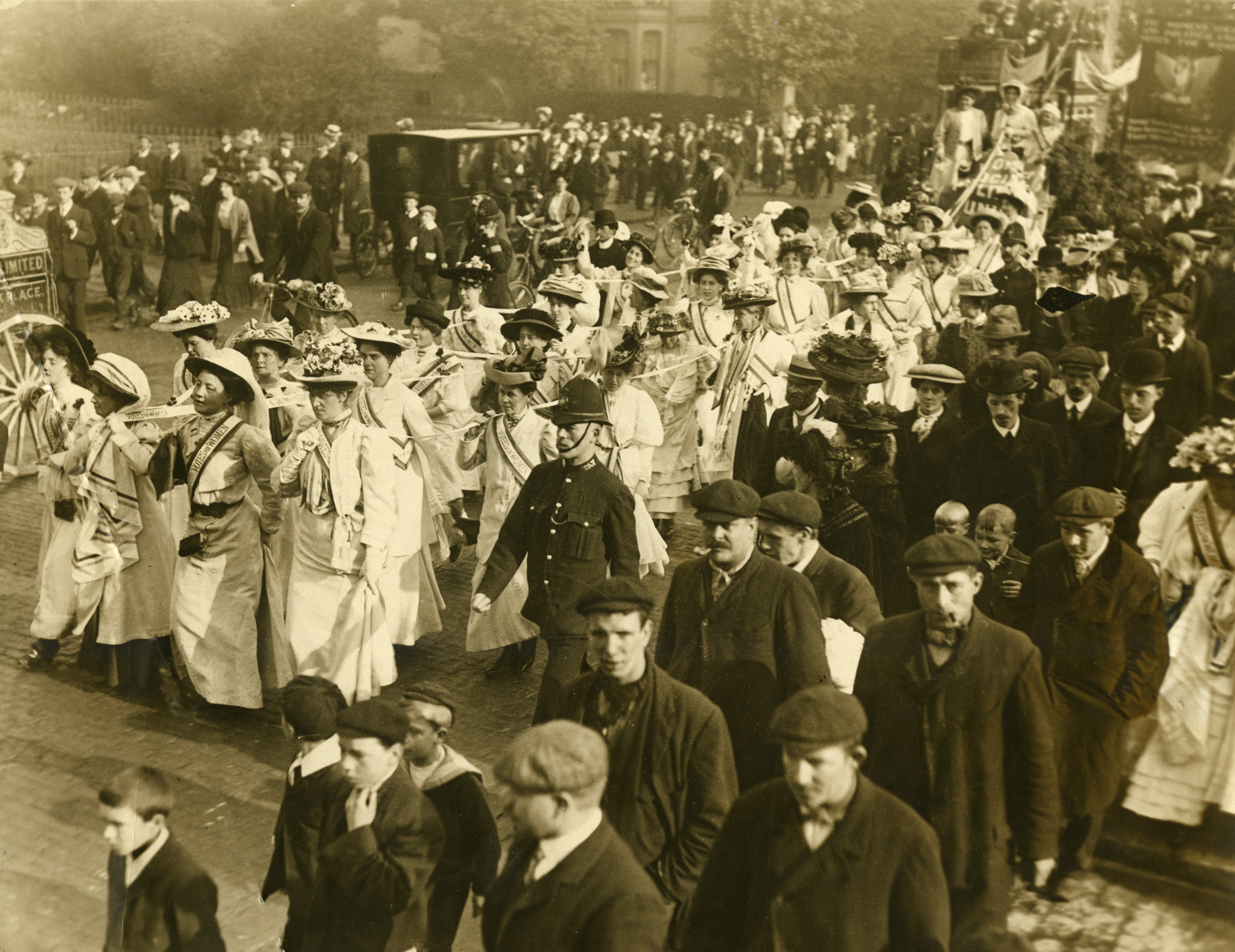
Processing suffragettes, c.1908. (22301202314)

Stephenson was also in the women's delegation with Emmeline Pethick-Lawrence, Florence Haig, Maud Joachim and Mary Phillips that attempted with Emmeline Pankhurst to enter the House of Commons, but was not one of those arrested then.

She was imprisoned however in November 1910, for a month, for breaking a window, at the home of Herbert Samuel, Liberal MP, telling his maid who answered the door that 'Suffragettes do not injure flesh and blood", following the harsh treatment of women protesters on Black Friday. The arrested women sang in the Black Maria police van on the way to Holloway Prison, where Stephenson wrote to Margaret Travers Simons to secretly send news from outside prison.

Stephenson described the treatment of women on arrival having their hair let down and searched, undressing to be searched, but since the change in rules, then allowed to wear their own clothes unlike most other prisoners. She was also allowed to get a letter from her barrister, saying she would lose her job and accommodation if she did not pay the fine to be released, but she refused and completed her sentence with the other imprisoned suffragettes. Fifteen, including Stephenson and Mary Clarke, were released just before Christmas, to be met by Emmeline Pankhurst, Mabel Tuke and a group of three hundred supporters.

At the celebration meal they all attended at the Criterion, Piccadilly for the release of prisoners, Stephenson was given a job offer as a paid organiser for WSPU and was placed next to Christabel Pankhurst, and made a speech reported inVotes for Women 30 December 1910 "Thank God for Mrs. Pankhurst."

Stephenson then organised the 1911 census night protest in Manchester.

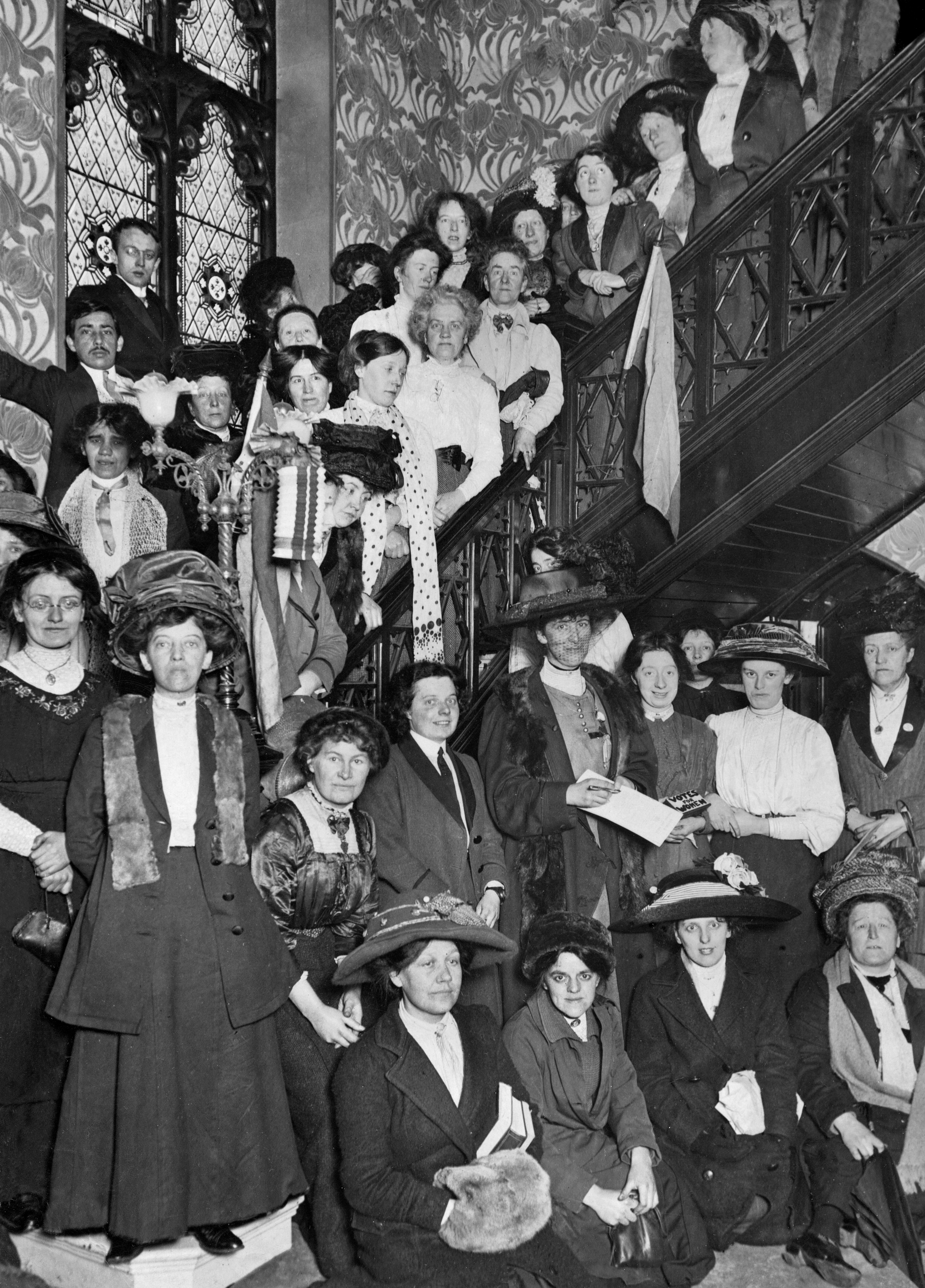
Suffragettes boycotting 1911 census in Manchester

== Right to vote granted ==
In 1918, after the First World War was almost over, and women had been pressed into roles previously unheard of in Britain whilst the men were at the front, the right for (some) women to vote was granted. Stephenson was clear in her writing "No Other Way' that the suffragist (non militant National Union of Women's Suffrage Societies) approach would not have achieved this alone:

Governments are not philanthropists - certainly not to non-voters - seldom give what they are absolutely not forced to, and I say with positive certainty - the Government would not have granted women's suffrage with such a harmless and poorly backed demand [of the NUWSS] ... . As it was the Government returning, all tired, to home affairs after the Great War, to a country recently ablaze from end to end with enthusiasm for women's vote, and likely to burst into still more desperate enthusiasm if denied, faced with this threat, passed the Electoral Bill in January [1918].

Stephenson's two volume memoirs 'No Other Way' were released in 1932. She also said:

Woman now has in her hands the key, to get repealed the scandalous laws made against her in the past ... We surviving warriors, battled, mauled and mostly worn out, look confidently to her to steadily and surely march towards the greatest reform the world has ever faced ... I have dreamt of since my early girlhood, which will, which must come.

Stephenson died in Norfolk in 1966.
