= Bill Sumner =

American politician (born 1934)

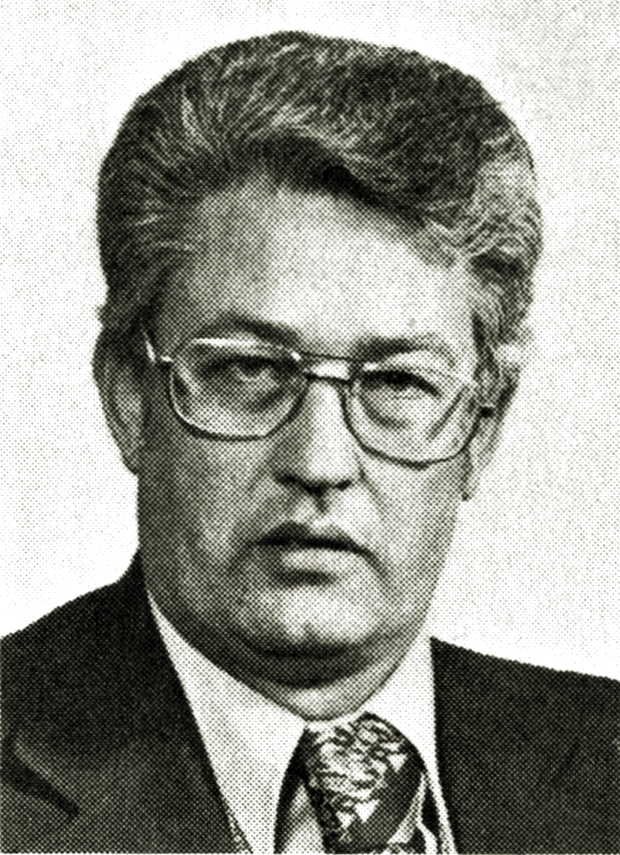
- Sumner in 1977

Member of the Alaska Senate
- In office 1977–1980

Personal details
- Born: March 16, 1934 (age 92) Gainesville, Florida, U.S.
- Party: Republican

William B. Sumner (born March 16, 1934) is an American politician. He served as a Republican member of the Alaska Senate.

== Life and career ==
Sumner was born in Gainesville, Florida. He served in the United States Navy.

Sumner served in the Alaska Senate from 1977 to 1980., losing reelection to Democrat Vic Fischer.
