= Jean Mary Daly =

Australianwomen's rights activist (1897–1986)

Jean Mary Daly OBE (10 December 1897 – 23 November 1986) was an Australian women's rights and social justice activist. Her work primarily focused on women's welfare and the importance of women in public life.

== Early life ==
She obtained a BA from University of Sydney in 1918. She married Harry John Daly on 6 October 1921 at St. Martha's Catholic Church, Strathfield.

== Career ==
Daly was a founding member of Altair, a discussion group created in 1943 to present the views of Catholic women on social issues to the Catholic Church and the government. One of Altair's earliest causes was a submission to the Department of Post-war Reconstruction stressing the importance of family structures in population policy.

In 1946, Daly became a founding member of the New South Wales branch of St. Joan's Social and Political Alliance. She encouraged women to play a more active role in public affairs as Catholic citizens. Eventually, she was elected branch president. Daly subsequently joined the revived Liaison Committee of Women's International Organisations Australia Group. This move was seen as controversial as then-Cardinal Norman Gilroy had advised Catholic women not to join and Catholic Weekly refused to advertise the group.

She attended the International Federation of University Women regional meeting in Manila in 1955 as an observer, and remained for the PPWA conference.

During the 50s and 60s, Daly was a columnist for Catholic Weekly. She regularly wrote about "the importance of women taking their place in public life".

=== United Nations ===
After 1948, Daly began to work internationally, serving as treasurer of the New South Wales Council for the Australian National Committee for the United Nations. In 1949, she attended UN sessions and inspected the UN's work in Paris and Rome, while participating in conferences and meetings in Amsterdam, New York and London. She represented Australia on the UN Commission on the Status of Women in 1951 and 1955. In 1952, she organized the Australian delegation to the Pan-Pacific Women's Association (PPWA) conference at Christchurch, New Zealand. By 1954 she had been elected president of the New South Wales division of the Australian Association for the United Nations. In 1957 she was an observer at the UN seminar, held in Bangkok, on civic responsibilities and increased participation of Asian women in public life.

== Recognition ==
In 1967, she was appointed Officer of the Order of the British Empire (OBE) for her work regarding the welfare of women.

== See also ==
- Phyllis Le Cappelaine Burke
- Mary Tenison Woods
- Women in the Catholic Church
