= Jane Angvik =

American politician (born 1948)

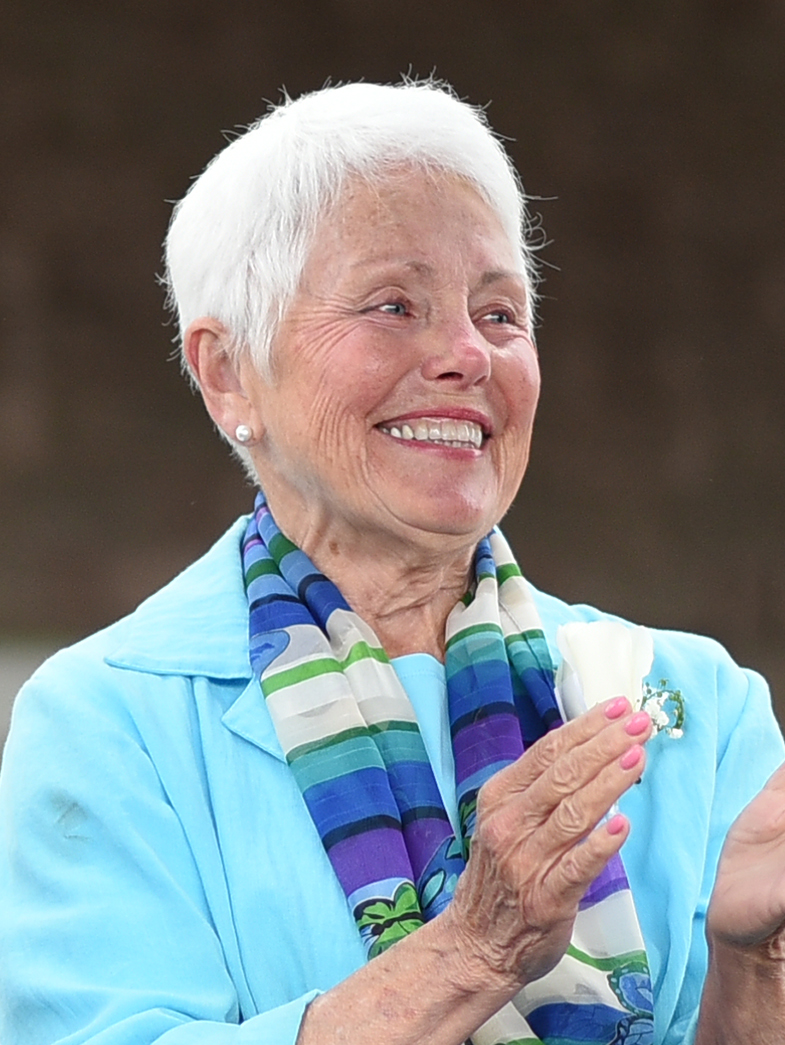
- Born: August 4, 1948 (age 78); Saint Paul, Minnesota, U.S.
- Education: University of Minnesota; Harvard Graduate School of Education
- Occupations: Politician, community organizer
- Office: Chair of the Anchorage Assembly
- Term: 1984–1985
- Political party: Democratic
- Spouse: Vic Fischer
- Children: 1

Jane Ruth Angvik (born August 4, 1948) is a politician and community organizer in Alaska. She served on the Anchorage Charter Commission and the Anchorage Assembly. Angvik was the director of lands in the Alaska Department of Natural Resources and commissioner of the Alaska Department of Commerce and Economic Development. She is a member of the Alaska Women's Hall of Fame.

== Biography ==
Angvik was born in 1948 in Saint Paul, Minnesota. She received her Bachelor's Degree in Arts from the University of Minnesota-Twin Cities. She also received her master's degree in administration and public policy from Harvard University Graduate School of Education.

Angvik began public life in the 1960s, where she worked for the Minneapolis Model Cities program. The program tackled areas with high rates of poverty, crime, unemployment, and aimed to improve community development. Angvik moved to Alaska in the early 1970s and continued her public life. In 1975, Angvik was elected to the Anchorage Charter Commission, which wrote the charter for the Municipality of Anchorage. She was elected as a member of the Anchorage Assembly in 1979 and 1982, and served as the chair of the Assembly from October 1984 to October 1985. In 1986, she ran for lieutenant governor. She also was the state Commissioner of Commerce and Economic Development until December 1990 and was the state Director of Lands in the Department of Natural Resources.

Angvik helped in the development of the Alaska Native Heritage Center between 1990 and 1995. She also helped create the Alaska Women's Political Caucus, now known as Alaska Women for Political Action. In 2019, she was a primary sponsor of the Fair Share Act to raise taxes on oil companies, which became Ballot Measure 1 in 2020 and was unsuccessful in the election.

Angvik has been active with the Girl Scouts of Alaska, and was the capital campaign chair to help construct Camp Singing Hills.

She was inducted into the Alaska Women's Hall of Fame in 2014 and serves as a board member.

Angvik was married to Vic Fischer from 1981 until his death in 2023. They had one daughter.
