= Florence Barry =

British suffragist (1885–1965)

- Born: 14 May 1885; Birkenhead, Merseyside, England
- Died: February 1965 (aged 79)
- Education: Faithful Companions of Jesus Convent School for Young Ladies; Liverpool School of Social Sciences
- Organization(s): Women's Social and Political Union, Catholic Women's Suffrage Society
- Awards: Pro Ecclesia et Pontifice

Florence Barry (14 May 1885 – February 1965) was a British suffragist, member of the Women's Social and Political Union (WSPU) and leader of the Roman Catholic feminist organisation St. Joan's International Alliance.

== Early life ==
Barry was born in 1885 in Birkenhead, Merseyside, England. Her father Zacharie Balthazar Barry (Bahri) was a Persian immigrant who had been born in Smyrna, became a naturalised British subject and worked as a fruit merchant. Her mother Frances Jane Barry (née Shrodder) was a charity worker of Austrian heritage, who worked for the poor.

== Education ==
Barry was educated at the Faithful Companions of Jesus (FCJ) Convent School for Young Ladies, Upton, Cheshire, and the English Convent at Bruges, Belgium, before attending the Liverpool University School of Social Sciences.

== Activism ==
Barry became active in the women's suffrage movement, and joined the WSPU. In 1912, she became a member of the Catholic Women's Suffrage Society (CWSS), later known as the St. Joan's International Alliance, and was appointed the honorary secretary of the Liverpool branch. She held this post for fifty (50) years. Also in 1912, she attended the Catholic Congress at Norwich. She would argue against ideas that politics and religion shared no common ground, stating that "in the Church we have the corporal and spiritual works of mercy, so surely we should have political works of mercy too."

By 1915, Barry had been appointed to the CWSS National Executive Committee. In 1927, Barry was amongst the signers of a letter to The Times newspaper supporting the vote for women over the age of 21.

Barry also liaised with international Catholic organisations and women's rights activists on other issues, such as communicating with the Trusteeship Council in support of questions they added to a questionnaire about the "physical integrity of women," which meant female circumcision (now known as female genital mutilation). She campaigned against "physical violations" of women.

After being appointed International Secretary of St. Joan's International Alliance, Barry supported the First Secretary of the French Branch, Marie Lenoel, campaigning against prostitution, modern slavery and the slave-trade. She collated evidence which was presented to the Commission Against Slavery and to committees set up by the League of Nations and the British Government.

Pope Pius XII awarded Barry the Pro Ecclesia et Pontifice medal in 1951, which is the highest papal honour that women can receive.

She died in February 1965. A requiem mass was held for her at Westminster Cathedral in London.
