= Gabrielle Jeffery =

British suffragist and Catholic activist (1886–1940)[

- Born: 1886; Devon, England
- Died: 1940 (aged 53–54)
- Organization(s): Women's Social and Political Union, Catholic Women's Suffrage Society

Gabrielle Violet Jeffery (1886–1940) was a British suffragist and one of the founders of the Catholic Women's Suffrage Society (1911–1923), predecessor of the St Joan's International Alliance.

== Biography ==
Jeffery was born in 1886 in Devon. Her father was J. E. B. Jeffery who worked for the Indian Civil Service.

She became active in the women's suffrage movement, and joined the Women's Social and Political Union (WSPU) in 1909. She became a paid WSPU organiser in Newport, Wales.

On 8 December 1910, coincidentally the date of the Feast of the Immaculate Conception, Jeffery was waiting outside Holloway Prison to welcome the release of imprisoned suffragettes. This was common practice for the WSPU at the time. Whilst waiting, Jeffery met Mary Kendall and they discussed the idea of creating a Roman Catholic women's suffrage organization to bring together Catholics, both male and female, to work towards women's suffrage.

Jeffery and Kendall founded the Catholic Women's Suffrage Society (CWSS) in 1911. Jeffery served as honorary secretary and treasurer. It was the only organized group of Roman Catholics in England established to actively and publicly participate in the campaign for women's enfranchisement, and the founders hoped that the organisation would give Catholic women a respectable way of becoming active in the movement. Over time the Society extended its interests and campaigned on other women's issues such as equal pay.

Jeffery died in 1940.
