= Alice Stewart Ker =

Scottish suffragette (1853–1943)

Alice Stewart Ker MRCPI
- Born: Alice Jane Shannan Ker; 2 December 1853; Deskford, Banffshire, Scotland
- Died: 20 March 1943 (aged 89)
- Citizenship: British
- Education: Bern and King's and Queen's College of Physicians
- Occupation: Physician
- Known for: 13th woman in the UK to be on the British Medical Association register, suffragette
- Spouse: Edward Stewart Ker (m. 1888–1907; his death)
- Children: 3

Alice Stewart Ker MRCPI (née Alice Jane Shannan Ker; 2 December 1853 – 20 March 1943) was a Scottish physician, health educator, and suffragette. She was the 13th woman on the registry of the British Medical Association.

== Early life and education ==
Alice Jane Shannan Ker was born on 2 December 1853 at Deskford in Banffshire, Scotland. She was the eldest of the nine children of Margaret Millar Stevenson (1826–1900), daughter of James Cochran Stevenson, Liberal MP for South Shields, and Reverend William Turnbull Ker (1824–1885), a Free Church minister.

At the age of 18 she moved to Edinburgh to study "University Classes for Ladies" including anatomy and physiology. While in Edinburgh, she met Sophia Jex-Blake, who was campaigning to have the University issue medical degrees to women. When Jex-Blake's petition was rejected by the University, Ker left Edinburgh to complete her medical training in Ireland where she was awarded her licentiateship from the King and Queen's College of Physicians of Ireland.

== Career ==
After completing her training, she returned to Edinburgh sharing a practice with Jex-Blake for a year. She was the 13th woman to be registered as a doctor in Britain. She then undertook further studies for a year in Bern, Switzerland, funded by her campaigning aunts Flora and Louisa Stevenson. When she returned to Britain she worked as a house surgeon at the Children's Hospital in Birmingham, and from there became a general practitioner in Leeds. In 1887, she returned to Edinburgh working as a self-employed doctor, and taking the Royal College of Surgeons Conjoint Examinations, one of only two women in that year to pass the finals.

She married her cousin, Edward Stewart Ker (1839–1907), in 1888, and they moved to Birkenhead. Together they had two daughters Margaret Louise (born 1892) and Mary Dunlop (born 1896); their son died in infancy. Her practice was in Birkenhead, where she was the only woman doctor in the area. It was successful and she had many additional duties having become the medical officer to female staff working at the Post Office as well as the Honorary Medical Officer to the Wirral Hospital for Sick Children, the Wirral Lying-In Hospital, the Birkenhead Rescue Home and the Caledonian Free Schools in Liverpool. She also gave talks and lectures to working-class women in Manchester on topics of sexuality, birth control and motherhood. These talks were published in 1891 work, Motherhood: A Book for Every Woman.

=== Suffrage movement ===
In 1893, Ker became involved in the Birkenhead and Wirral Women's Suffrage Society, and after her husband's death in 1907, her interest in women's suffrage became an increasing priority for her. She became chair of the local Suffrage Society but finding them too moderate, in 1907 with Alice Morrissey, she joined the more progressive Women's Social and Political Union. Ker worked with Ada Flatman who was a WSPU employee. Flatman and Patricia Woodlock organised the WSPU shop which raised substantial funds for the cause.

In March 1912, she was imprisoned after being among 200 women breaking windows at Harrods Department store, an action organised by the Women's Social and Political Union. She was force fed whilst in Holloway prison, and as result she was released with ill health before the end of her two-month sentence. She wrote poetry while in prison, contributing to "Holloway Jingles, a collection published by the Glasgow branch of the Women's Social and Political Union. In Holloway, she was a co-signatory on The Suffragette Handkerchief. She received a Hunger Strike Medal from the leadership of the WSPU. Ker was still working as a doctor but she was asked to leave one hospital. She moved to Liverpool, where she wrote to her two daughters to seek out Patricia Woodlock and offer their services to the cause of women's rights to vote. Margaret indeed followed in her mother's footsteps, and in November 1912 was sentenced to three months in prison for placing a "dangerous substance" in a post box in Liverpool

== Personal life ==
Ker was a vegetarian and anti-vivisectionist. She died on 20 March 1943.

== Legacy ==
The name Alice Ker Square was given to a public square during redevelopment of central Birkenhead in the early 2020s.

== Selected works ==
- 1891, Motherhood: A Book for Every Woman
