= Ada Flatman =

English suffragette (1876–1952)

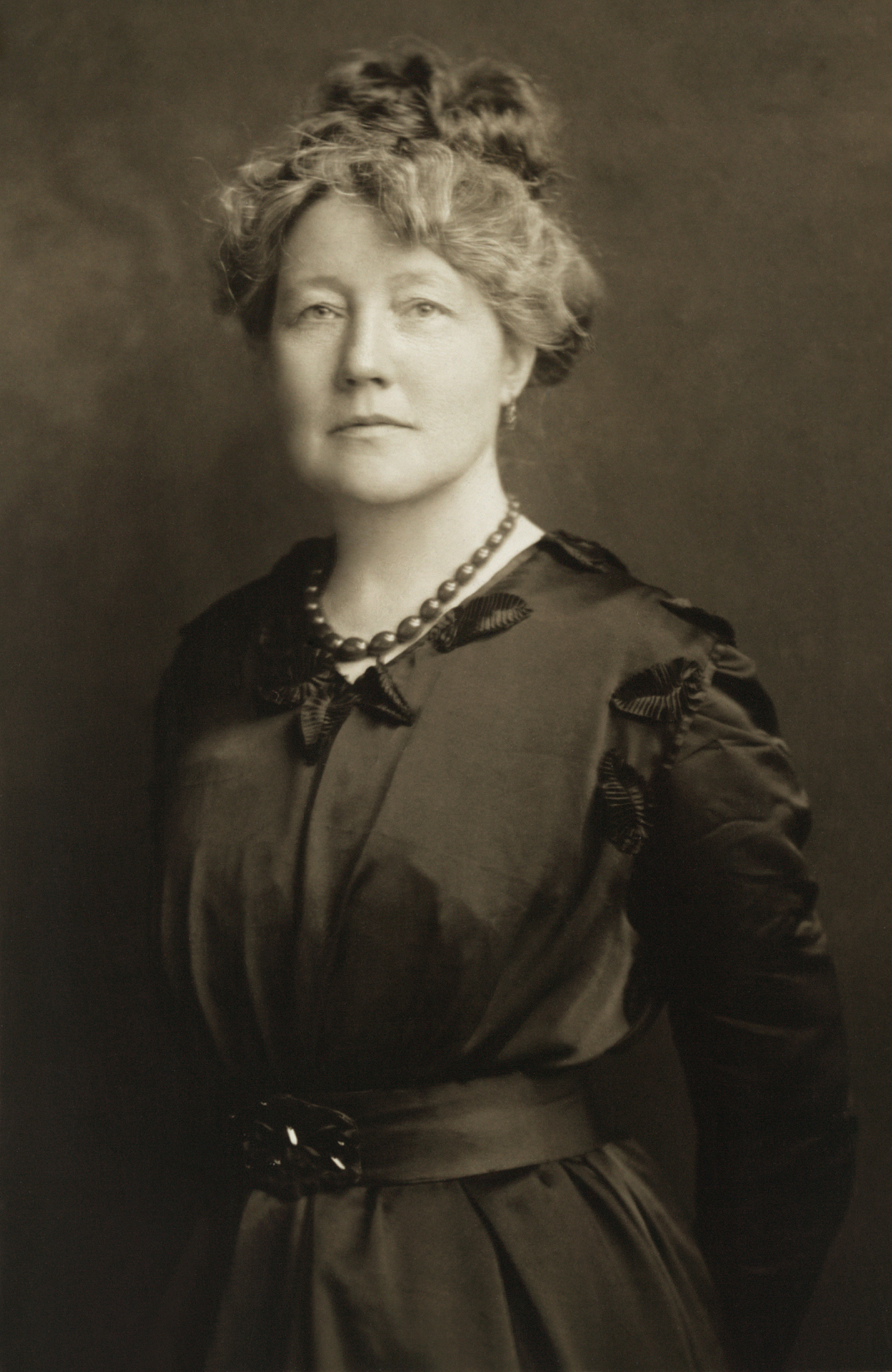
- Flatman, c. 1917
- Born: Ada Susan Flatman; 1876; Suffolk, England
- Died: 1952 (aged 75–76); Eastbourne, Sussex, England
- Occupation: Suffragette

Ada Susan Flatman (1876–1952) was a British suffragette who worked in the United Kingdom and the United States.

== Early life ==
Ada Susan Flatman was born in Suffolk in 1876. She lived in the same Twentieth Century Club Notting Hill rooms as fellow activist Jessie Stephenson. She was of independent means and became interested in women's rights.

== Activism ==
Flatman was sent to Holloway Prison, after she took part in the raid on the Houses of Parliament in 1908, led by Marion Wallace Dunlop, Ada Wright, and Katherine Douglas Smith, and a second wave by Una Dugdale.

The following year she was employed by the Women's Social and Political Union (WSPU) to organise their activities in Liverpool, taking over from Mary Phillips. Flatman arranged humble lodgings for Constance Lytton when she came to Liverpool disguised as a working woman, aiming to get arrested for suffragette activism to created suitable publicity.

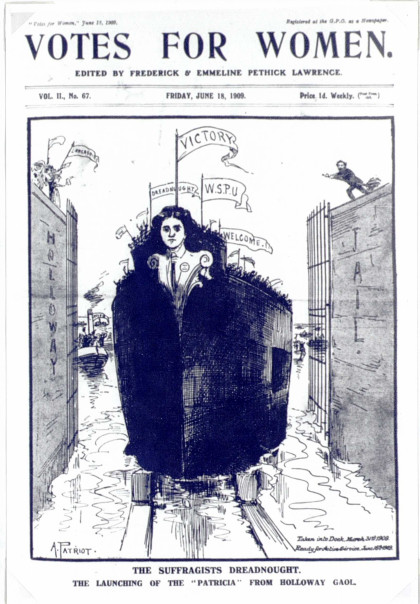
May 1909 front cover of Votes for Women depicting Patricia Woodlock as a dreadnought

In Liverpool she worked with Alice Stewart Ker, but it was Flatman who was trusted by Emmeline Pethick when Liverpool requested that they be allowed to open a WSPU shop. The shop was set up for her by Patricia Woodlock and became a success and it raised substantial funds for the cause. Flatman later organised the publicity surrounding the release of Woodlock who had completed a prison term in Holloway. A 1909 copy of Votes for Women depicted "Patricia" as a dreadnought.

By May 1909, Flatman travelled to Bristol where the anti-suffrage politician Augustine Birrell was at the Royal Hotel to give a speech to the local Chamber of Commerce. Flatman checked into a room at the hotel the night before the event and successfully evaded detectives assigned to follow her. After the speech's were given and a guard turned his head to speak to someone, Flatman pushed over a 10 foot barricade and ran into the room, shouting "give votes to taxpaying women!" She threw hundreds handbills in the suffragette colours of green, purple and white into the crowd which asked for Liberal men to support women's enfranchisement. She was dragged out of the event.

During the August 1909, Flatman took part in a summer campaign on the Isle of Man, and was nearly knocked off a pier when attacked by anti-suffragists. In December 1909, she was one of the group of suffragettes in the Royal Albert Hall to protest against David Lloyd George's position regarding women's suffrage. In a contemporary newspaper account in the London Evening Standard, suffrage campaigner Frances Ede described how stewards dragged Flatman from her seat and removed her "with quite needless violence".

In July 1910, Flatman was a key speaker at one of the platforms in the 10,000 women's rally at Hyde Park in London. Flatman suddenly stepped down as Liverpool branch co-ordinator in 1910, over a difference in approach to campaigning. Alice Morrissey took over as volunteer branch organiser from her, until another staff member was appointed.

In the following year, Flatman became the honorary secretary for the WSPU in Cheltenham. Shortly after her appointment, Flatman organised for Emmeline Pankhurst, Evelyn Sharp and Constance Lytton to visit and deliver talks in Cheltenham. The talks were well attended and reported on by the local and regional press, particularly Lytton's comment that women's rights in Britain were "still in the Stone Age". Flatman also started organising local "at homes".

When the 1911 census was taken, Flatman organised "a midnight super party" at her home at Bedford Lodge, College Road, Gloucestershire, so that a group of suffragettes could evade enumeration. When the Liberal Government Minister Charles Hobhouse spoke in Gloucester's Shire Hall, Flatman vainly tried to ask him questions about women's suffrage but was ejected.

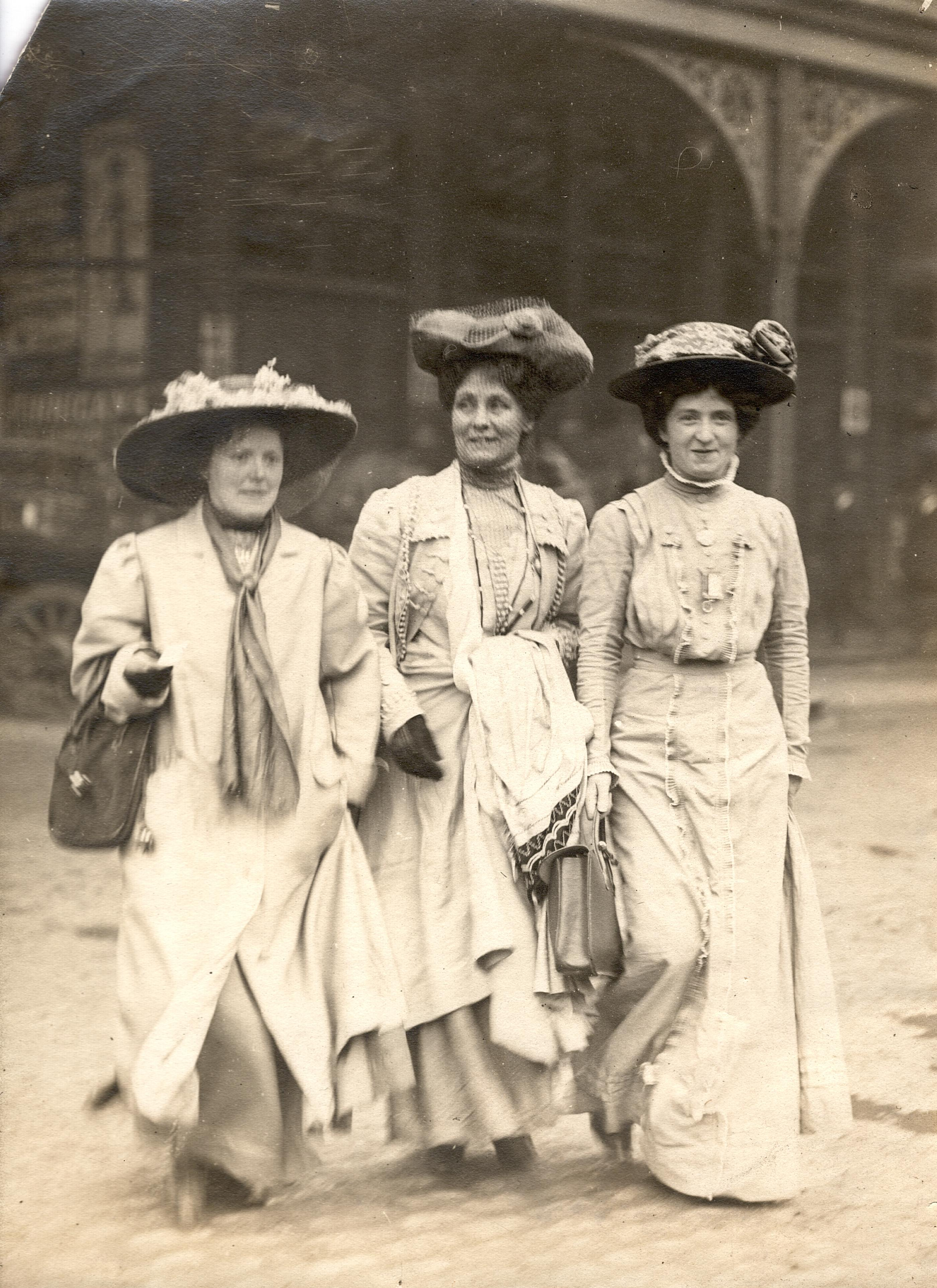
Mary Gawthorpe, Emmeline Pankhurst and Ada Flatman

== Move to the United States ==
When the First World War started in 1914, the leading suffrage organisations agreed to suspend their protest until the war was over. Many activists disagreed; Flatman, living in Bristol, was one, joining the Women's Emergency Corps, founded by Evelina Haverfield. She decided to carry on her work in the United States, emigrating to work for Alice Paul's newspaper The Suffragist in 1915, becoming its business and advertising manager.

Flatman was in Chicago in 1916, working as an outdoor organiser for the Women's Party Convention taking place there. The New York Herald stated that she inaugurated the campaign of erecting billboards singlehandedly; noting that she did so dressed wholly in the suffrage colour of purple. The report further noted that Flatman was directing anti-Wilson billboard squads throughout the suffrage states with a view to them pasting a total of one million.

== Later life ==
After the war, Flatman was keen to continue her suffrage work, but organisations in America and South Africa did not accept her offers of assistance. Full women's suffrage was achieved in the U.S. in 1920 and in the UK in 1928. Flatman returned to England in the 1930s, and was a peace campaigner. Flatman died in Eastbourne, Sussex, in 1952.

== Legacy ==
Flatman supported the work of Edith How-Martyn in documenting the movement in the Suffragette Fellowship. She left £25 in her will (out of an estate of £250) to the fellowship.

Flatman's reminiscences were recorded by the BBC. She had also kept a scrapbook of her suffrage adventures, now held by the Museum of London, and also donated a breakfast loaf that she had brought out from Holloway Prison and preserved as a relic of the cause.
