= Mary Bamber =

Mary Hardie Bamber (née Little; 18 January 1874 – 4 June 1938), often known as Ma Bamber, was a Scottish socialist, trade unionist, social worker, and suffragist. Her daughter Bessie Braddock was a prominent Labour Member of Parliament (MP).

Bamber was active in Liverpool and nationally for the best part of fifty years, present at key moments in Merseyside labour history, in the forefront of several prominent disputes. As a Labour councillor and a Justice of the Peace she promoted the dissemination of contraceptive advice as a mechanism to empower women.

Privately educated and living in one of the most affluent parts of Edinburgh, Bamber's early life was very different from that of the poor in Liverpool she was ultimately to live among. However, when still a girl, her lawyer father, Andrew Little, took to the drink and one day walked out on the family never to be seen again. Her mother Agnes Glanders Little (née Thomson)'s life up until then had been poor preparation for the rigours of single motherhood with six surviving children to provide for. She worked hard charring and in other jobs to support her family, making a close acquaintance with near destitution and, when her eldest son got a job with a printer in Liverpool, the family came with him. The Liverpool they came to, dominated as it was by casual labour and irregularity of income, was characterised by poverty, ill health, squalid housing conditions and hand-to-mouth subsistence.

During the winter of 1906–07, she was on the rota of women who made soup to sell at a farthing a bowl from a Clarion caravan parked by St George's Hall on Lime Street. She visited the sick, collected for the unemployed and kept open house for travelling socialists. She frequently spoke at outdoor meetings, often at the Wellington monument or on street corners. Sylvia Pankhurst described her as the "finest, fighting platform speaker in the country". In a city that was dominated by sectarianism, she refused any religious identification and was a regular heckler at both Catholic and Protestant political rallies. However, it was through her work as a trade union organiser that Bamber became most visible. In the years leading up to the First World War, she worked tirelessly as an official for the Warehouse Workers Union. She travelled the length of the dock road, organising women from Johnson's Cleaners and Dye Works in the North end to Wilson's Bobbin Works in the South.

Bamber was often up before dawn to catch bag women – who made and mended the millions of sacks used to contain and transport the products which passed through the port – as they walked to work. Like employment in rope manufacture, which also drew Bamber's attention, this was heavy, filthy, poorly paid work often undertaken by only the most desperate such as women caring for dependents, married women, or elderly single women. Bamber gave a great deal of time - often fruitlessly in terms of actual recruitment - to talking to these women, pressing leaflets on them and persuading them to come to meetings. Bamber spoke at meetings with the Liverpool Independent Labour Party and Women's Social and Political Union organiser, Alice Morrissey attracting crowds.

Though her work as a trade union organiser was central to Bamber's politics, it was interwoven with other activity. She was present at the 'Bloody Sunday' demonstration during the 1911 Liverpool general transport strike. In 1919, she stood as the Labour Party candidate in the Protestant stronghold of Everton ward. Campaigning on everyday issues such as milk, education and municipal laundries, she won by a tiny majority. The same year, she became a founder member of the local Communist Party and in 1920 she attended the Second Congress of the Third International in Moscow. She was a local committee member on the National Unemployed Workers Committee and, in September 1921, was one of those arrested at the occupation of the Walker Art Gallery. She did not seek a second term as city councillor and by 1924 she had left the Communist Party, saying that it interfered with her work as an organiser. She was present at all the key demonstrations held during the 1920s and into the thirties. She spoke at her last meeting just two weeks before her death at age 64.
