= Helen Fischer =

American politician

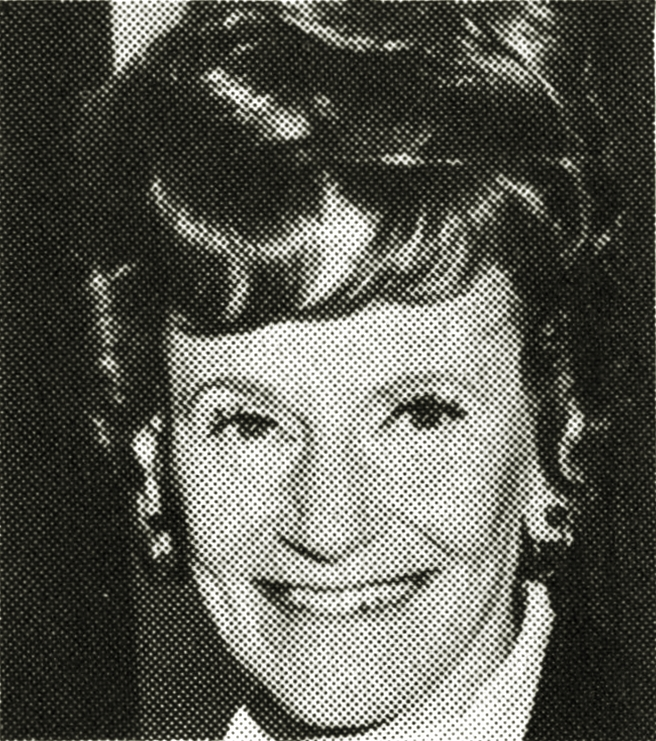

Member of the Alaska House of Representatives from the 10th district
- In office January 26, 1959 – January 22, 1961

Member of the Alaska House of Representatives from the 12th district (8th district 1971–1975)
- In office January 11, 1971 – June 30, 1976

Personal details
- Born: Helen Marie Schmid; June 2, 1912 Sleepy Eye, Minnesota
- Died: November 29, 1986 (aged 74) Palm Springs, California
- Party: Democratic
- Spouse(s): Edward Anthony Fischer (m. 1933)
- Profession: Businesswoman, politician

Helen Marie Fischer (née Schmid; June 2, 1912 – November 29, 1986) was an American politician and activist. She fought for Alaska Statehood and women's rights. A Democrat, she served in the Alaska Territorial House of Representatives in 1957–1959 and then the Alaska House of Representatives 1959–1961 and 1971–1975 before and after Alaska became a state. In 2009, she was inaugurated into the Alaska Women's Hall of Fame.

== Personal life ==
Helen Fischer was born in Sleepy Eye, Minnesota on June 2, 1912, and studied journalism at the University of Minnesota. She married Edward Antony Fischer in 1933, with whom she had three children. Fischer moved to Alaska in 1945, and, later in her life, purchased a house in California with her husband. She moved there permanently around 1983. She died on November 29, 1986, in Palm Springs, California a few days after a fall where she broke her hip.

== Career ==
=== Alaska Constitutional Convention and statehood ===
From 1955 to 1956, Fischer was a delegate at the Alaska Constitutional Convention representing the city of Anchorage. Fischer was one of six women at the convention. During the writing process she advocated for gender to be considered a protected class in Alaskan bill of rights, saying that such protection was necessary "because there are still states in the Union where women are not allowed to serve on juries". She was the first secretary for "Operation Statehood". As part of her role, she campaigned for Alaskan statehood with Bob Bartlett in Alaska and Washington D.C.

=== Alaska House of Representatives ===
From 1957 to 1959, she was a member of the Territorial House of Representatives, and then from 1959 to 1961, she served as one of the first members of the new Alaska House of Representatives. She was reelected in 1971, and held the office until her retirement in 1976. As a member of the legislature, she created a bill to establish a State Department of Tourism.

=== Other work ===
Fischer held a variety of other positions in her career. She was a chairman for the third district of American Cancer Society, on the board of trustees for the Alaska Pacific University, and on the first board of the Alaska Center for Children and Adults, then known as the Alaska Crippled Children's Association. She worked for the U. S. Treasury for twelve years as the director of the Alaskan Savings Bond division. From 1956 to 1963, she was the Alaskan representative for the Democratic National Committee.

She was one of the proponents of the 1970s attempt to change the Alaskan capital from Juneau to Willow. The attempt was ultimately unsuccessful, being rejected by voters in 1982.

== Legacy ==
In 2009, she was inaugurated into the Alaska Women's Hall of Fame due to her work in politics and Alaska's journey to statehood.
