= St. Joan's International Alliance =

Feminist Catholic international women's organization

St. Joan's International Alliance is a non profit women's organisation. St. Joan's is a feminist Catholic organisation, with a focus on women's equality. It is named after St. Joan of Arc. The organisation has played a major role in influencing the ordination of women and general human rights. Their mission is "to secure the political, social and economic equality between men and women and to further the work and usefulness of Catholic women as citizens".

== History ==
=== The Catholic Women's Suffrage Society ===
The organisation was founded in London, England in 1911 as the Catholic Women's Suffrage Society, with a focus on organising Catholic women in England to support women's suffrage.

==== Founding ====
Prior to the founding of the Catholic Women's Suffrage Society, Catholic suffragettes had participated in other suffrage organisations, such as the Women's Social and Political Union (WSPU), the Women's Freedom League (WFL), and the National Union of Women's Suffrage Societies (NUWSS).

The roots of the Catholic Women's Suffrage Society began when young Catholic suffragettes Gabrielle Jeffery and May Kendall met on 8 December 1910, coincidentally the date of the Feast of the Immaculate Conception. Jeffery and Kendall met while waiting outside Holloway Prison to welcome the release of imprisoned suffragettes, a common practice for the WSPU in England at the time. Jeffery and Kendall developed the idea of creating a Catholic women's suffrage organisation to bring together Catholics, male and female, to work towards women's suffrage. Together with seven other Catholic suffragists, they held their first meeting on 25 March 1911 and created the Catholic Women's Suffrage Society. Early members of the CWSS, in addition to Jeffery and Kendall, included Alice Abadam, Florence Barry, Beatrice Gadsby, Christabel Marshall, Christine O’Connor, Smyth Pigott, Monica Whately, and Kathleen Fitzgerald, who was appointed first chairman of the Society. The purpose of the Society was “to band together Catholics of both sexes, in order to secure the Parliamentary vote on the same terms as it is, or may be granted to men."

The Catholic Women's Suffrage Society chose for its colours blue, gold, and white: blue representing Mary the mother of Christ, and gold and white in reference to the papacy of the Catholic church. In addition, the CWSS chose Joan of Arc as their patron.

While the CWSS was founded in London, additional branches were later created throughout United Kingdom. The first branch outside of London was founded in 1911 in Hastings in East Sussex. In the next several years, other branches sprung up in Liverpool, Brighton, Plymouth, Cardiff, Manchester, Birmingham, Wakefield, Oxford, and Oldham, as well as some Scottish branches.

==== Catholicism and Women's Suffrage ====
The CWSS sought to promote and improve the perception of women's suffrage among Catholics in England. Catholic opinion on women's suffrage was mixed, among both clergy and laypeople. Early on, the Society sought the approval of prominent Catholic clergy, and also worked with other Catholic organisations. For example, in December 1911, the CWSS wrote to prominent members of the Catholic clergy, including the Archbishop of Westminster, asking them to consider the social, moral, and religious importance of extending the right to vote to women. Also, starting in 1911, the CWSS started sending representatives to the National Catholic Congress.

The CWSS also worked to challenge anti-suffrage sentiments among Catholic clergy. The Reverend Henry Day, for example, opposed women's suffrage and denied the equality of men and women, and was often quoted in the press. In response, the members of the CWSS gathered and passed out CWSS leaflets outside the churches where he preached in Manchester and Liverpool, and also denounced Day's words by writing to the press.

==== Activities ====
Soon after its founding, the Catholic Women's Suffrage Society quickly began participating in the women's suffrage movement. On 17 June 1911 the CWSS joined with other women's suffrage organisations in the Women's Coronation Procession. Around eighty members of the CWSS participated in the procession, many representing Catholic societies and wearing religious medals and ribbons. In 1912, the CWSS joined a demonstration of religious suffrage organisations in a demonstration at Trafalgar Square.

The CWSS, like other suffrage organisations, adopted a stance on militancy, a controversial and divisive issue for many suffragists. The Society decided to be non-partisan and non-militant, focusing instead on constitutional methods. Militant members were allowed to join, on the condition that their militant actions did not represent the CWSS. While the Society itself remained committed to non-militant actions, they refused to denounce militant suffragettes, and in fact condemned the mistreatment of imprisoned suffragettes, especially the practice of force-feeding suffragettes on hunger strike.

Unlike some groups that suspended their direct efforts at suffrage during World War I, the Catholic Women's Suffrage Society continued to work towards women's suffrage in England. The CWSS's Annual Report in 1914 states, “it rests with us to see that the position of women is not worse after the war than it was before.” Beginning in 1915, the CWSS created its own journal, the Catholic Suffragist, first edited by Leonora de Alberti, which openly promoted women's suffrage and equal rights.

==== Post World War I ====
In 1918, the Representation of the People Act granted suffrage to British women over the age of thirty. In celebration, the CWSS organised a Mass of Thanksgiving at Westminster Cathedral on 17 February 1918. Catholic and non-Catholic suffragists attended, including Millicent Fawcett and Margaret Nevinson. However, while they celebrated the partial suffrage victory, the CWSS continued to work towards full suffrage for all women, and for women's rights in general. This included issues such as women's representation in national organisations, equal pay for men and women's work, and women holding political office. The CWSS also changed the name of its journal from the Catholic Suffragist to the Catholic Citizen.

The CWSS also began to focus on international organisations and issues, such as international women's suffrage and international Catholicism. In 1920, the CWSS sent delegates to the International Woman Suffrage Alliance in Switzerland. Later that same year, the CWSS met with American and international suffrage leader Carrie Chapman Catt, who stated, “practically the whole world had been won to suffrage with the exception of the Latin Catholic countries,” and encouraged the members to help Catholic women all over the world.

=== St. Joan's International Alliance ===
As of 1923, the organisation had members in 5 continents in 24 countries. That year it changed its name to St. Joan's Social and Political Alliance (SJSPA). The organisation presented a paper about "the Condition of Women", to the League of Nations in 1937. That paper is considered an influence on International matrimonial law. St. Joan's was the first group in Catholicism to work for women priests.

The first chapter in Australia was founded in 1946, in New South Wales by Mary Tenison Woods, the first practicing women lawyer in South Australia, and reformer of the child welfare system in South Australia and New South Wales, and chief of the UN Status of Women. Additional Australia chapters started in 1950 and the first Australian conference was held in 1951 in Sydney. Enid Lyons was the Victoria, Australia founding president. The first German chapter was founded in 1950, starting in West Germany with approximately 50 members. In 1952, the organisation was placed on consultative status with the United Nations, triggered by the organisations involvement in a discussion with the United Nations about female castration. The organisation also became involved in anti-slavery and anti-human trafficking causes. At that time, the United Kingdom founding chapter was known as the Great Britain and Northern Ireland Section of the St Joan's International Alliance.

In 1977, The Catholic Citizen was published in English and French. They also publish materials in Spanish. Since 1967, the organisation has issued resolutions following women and human rights focused declarations by the Vatican. St. Joan's also influenced the Catholic community in Canada to approve of the ordination of women in 1971. Collections and archives related to the organisation are held in the Women's Library at the London School of Economics.

== Notable members ==
Notable members included Alaskan lawyer and politician Dorothy Awes Haaland, who served as president of the Alaskan chapter. Mary Tenison Woods, Anna Maria Dengel, Mary Daly, Elizabeth Farians, Enid Lyons, Ida Raming, and Patricia Woodlock were also a members.

== Bibliography ==
- Daigler, Mary Jeremy. Incompatible with God's Design: A History of the Women's Ordination Movement in the U.S. Roman Catholic Church. Lanham: Scarecrow Press (2012). ISBN 0810884801
