= Frances Gordon =

British suffragette (born c. 1874)

- Born: Florence Graves c. 1874
- Died: Croydon, England
- Known for: Suffragette
- Relatives: Ada J. Graves (sister)

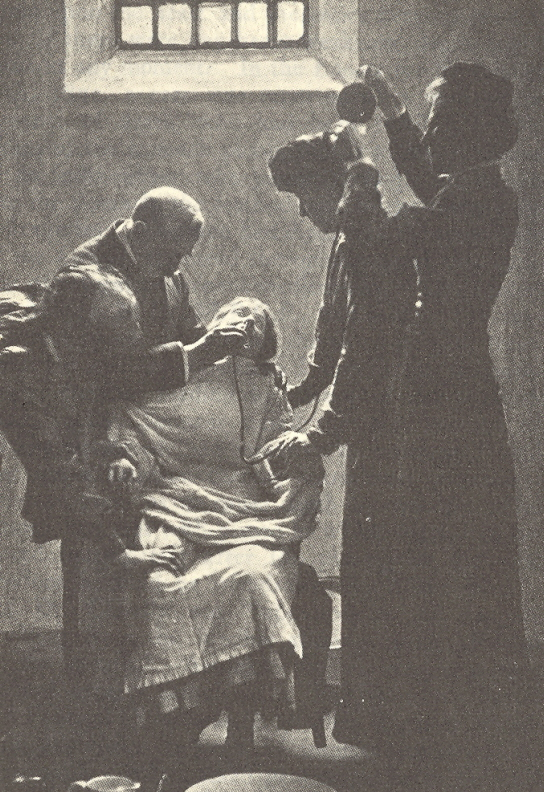
A suffragette on hunger strike being forcibly fed with a nasal tube

Frances Graves aka Frances Gordon (born around 1874) was a British suffragette who became prominent in the militant wing of the Scottish women's suffrage movement prior to the First World War and was imprisoned and force-fed for her actions.

== Campaigning for women's suffrage and arrest ==
Frances (Florence) Graves adopted the alias Frances Gordon while campaigning for women's suffrage. Adopting an alias was not uncommon for campaigners, either to avoid their families being condemned by association or to evade capture by police.

Gordon and Arabella Scott were prominent in the militant wing of the Scottish women's suffrage movement. The pair were arrested after breaking into Springhall House, a mansion house in Lanarkshire, with the intention of setting it on fire on 3 April 1914. The house was not occupied but a caretaker was awoken by a noise at 2:30am and was astonished to find Gordon in the parlour.

The caretaker fired two shots with his revolver to alert the local constable on the beat, the noise of which caused the other suffragettes accompanying Gordon to flee the house. Frightened by the shots, the caretaker was able to lock Gordon in the kitchen and telephone the police. On arrival, the police found three-quarter gallon flasks of paraffin oil, matches and suffrage literature. Gordon was arrested and taken away.

== Trial ==
Gordon was described as a small woman of about forty years of age with a pronounced English accent. The lady owner of Springhall House declined to prosecute Gordon but the public prosecutor decided to proceed with the trial date fixed for 22 June 1914.

At the High Court of Glasgow, Gordon was charged with attempting to set fire to Springhall House. Gordon pleaded not guilty and her counsel attempted to have the case thrown out on a technicality – that housebreaking with intent to set a fire was not a crime in Scotland – but the attempt was unsuccessful and the guilty verdict was returned by the jury. She was sentenced to one year's imprisonment.

The Glasgow Evening Times covering the trial described "Miss Gordon's Remarkable Speech" as she left the court. Shouting to the gallery, she cried "Trust in God, constant war and fight on."

While the Evening Times made no mention of any disturbances, the High Court's own records mention three women being charged with contempt of court "in respect that they interrupted the proceedings of the Court by shouting and yelling (or by throwing missiles in the direction of the bench)". The three women refused to give their names to court officials.

== Imprisonment ==
While imprisoned in Perth prison, Arabella Scott, Gordon and fellow militant suffragette Fanny Parker were subjected to force-feeding. Dr Hugh Ferguson Watson had already subjected Ethel Moorhead to the treatment at Calton Prison in February 1914. The prisoners' mouths were held open by a metal device so that they could be fed by a funnel connected to a Vaseline-coated rubber tube pushed down their throats into their stomachs. The mixture contained eggs, sweetened milk, and meat juice.

Aware of Moorhead's earlier treatment, the Women's Social and Political Union (WSPU) organised a series of protest meetings in Perth to support the women; picketing the prison, singing hymns and shouting support through a megaphone.

In Arabella Scott's autobiography, she describes the experience of being forcibly fed as bits of her broken teeth washed around with blood in her mouth. When she vomited after the tube was removed, "He [Watson] shouted at me 'you did that on purpose'." Parker and Gordon also alleged that this force-feeding involved attempts to feed through the rectum and the vagina which resulted in serious damage.

Gordon's force-feeding was to last ten days. She was fed with the nasal tube and had injections into her bowel three times a day. Christabel Pankhurst reacted strongly to condemn to this news, "To subject her to it without her consent was an act of violence and indecency on the part of the authorities which cannot and will not be tolerated."

On 26 June 1914, Dr. Watson, described as an "ambitious medical officer who had volunteered to force feed women on hunger strike", informed the governor of Perth prison that Gordon was of "a highly neurotic and hysterical temperament. There has been more or less nervous prostration since I told her that I had orders to feed her." Even during her sleep, Gordon "talked much about tubes and feeding". She had a very narrow phalanx and nasal passage and had "great difficulty breathing after the tube is passed."

Watson recorded that as Gordon vomited so much, he decided to feed her rectally through nutrient enemas in addition to food from the nasal tube from 30 June onwards. At first he was satisfied with the results but then he notes that on 3 July "the prisoner's condition now begins to cause anxiety". Gordon's temperature fell to 96.4 Fahrenheit and her pulse could sometimes barely be felt at all.

== Reaction to news of the force-feeding ==
The knowledge that new feeding tubes would not always have been available and that used tubes may have been dirty inside or previously used on diseased or mentally inmates may have increased Gordon's distress and the vociferous condemnations by her fellow suffragettes. When Gordon's 'treatment' was revealed, Dr. Watson was stunned by the furore it provoked in others. Lord Hugh Cecil, for one, told the Scottish Office that he intended to ask a question about Gordon's treatment in the House of Commons.

On 26 June 1914, Janie Allan, a leading Scottish activist in the militant suffragette movement, wrote to the Chairman of the Prison Commission that the burning down of Whitekirk Church in East Lothian, one of Scotland's most beautiful medieval churches, was the direct result of the force-feeding of Ethel Moorhead in Calton Prison and that the Scottish suffragettes would take strong action if the same was proved to have been inflicted on Arabella Scott and Frances Gordon.

Allan also wrote a similar letter to Dr. James Drevon stating that "there are many women who, 6 months ago, were not prepared to do anything violently militant, but who today would not hesitate." As a consequence, the planned tour of Scotland by the King and Queen in mid-July would see protests which "would be regrettable but to those who know how high feeling runs against forcible feeding, such incidents would cause no surprise."

The Scottish Office questioned whether any action could be taken against Janie Allan because of her veiled threats, but the Director of Public Prosecutions advised not.

Christabel Pankhurst went further in her condemnation:

"This women-torturing government composed, not of men, but surely of devils! [Forcible feeding represented] all the barbarity, all the blind, brute force upon which the subjection of women depends... it is the opposition to Votes for Women." .

== Release from prison ==
On 3 July 1914, Gordon was released from prison under the Cat and Mouse Act and taken to Glasgow. It was there she was examined by Dr. Mabel Jones M.D.

The socialist Tom Anderson wrote to the Glasgow Evening Times about the case which quoted from the medical assessment Dr. Mabel Jones conducted on Gordon on her release:

"I saw her (Miss. Gordon) at midnight on July 3. Her appearance was appalling, like a famine victim: the skin brown, her face bones standing out, her eyes half shut, her voice a whisper, her hands quite cold, her pulse a thread, her wrist joints slightly swollen, stiff, and painful, the breath most offensive, and the contents of the bowel beyond control." Reduced to the nearest point of death possible. Such treatment is barbarous and it is performed by civilised men because of a political offence, on women. Is it possible for the race to fall any lower? I don't think so.

On 16 July 1914, Lord Hugh Cecil, John Pratt and Maurice Healy all raised the question of Frances Gordon's treatment in the House of Commons. The then Secretary for Scotland (Thomas McKinnon Wood) replied that:

"On admission she was at once put to bed and treated as a sick prisoner. Her condition required the administration of enemata, and I have no reason to doubt that in the circumstances the doctor treated her case properly and humanely. The doctor states that there was very little difference in her appearance when she was discharged...that she made no complaint of pain; that she was able to converse, and did converse freely with the doctor's assistant who accompanied her on the journey to Glasgow; that it is true that the breath was offensive, but that it had been offensive from the date of admission; and that generally the statement as to her condition is exaggerated."

Lord Hugh Cecil challenged Mr. McKinnon Wood on whether in his answer he was guided wholly by the opinion of the medical officer whose action is called in question, or whether he has any independent opinion. To which Mr. McKinnon Wood responded:

"I must be guided by the report of the medical officer who was responsible for this matter....the reason [that these women prisoners have in all recent cases been sent to Perth prison] is that we have there doctors who are accustomed to deal with those cases and are thoroughly skilled.... I think the only thing I can add to what I have said already in the reply which dealt with most of the details of the woman's condition, is to say that she was able to walk to the cab and from the cab to the railway station, and in the railway train she was able to sit up and, as the doctor puts it, admire the scenery."

Gordon had been given a Hunger Strike Medal 'for Valour' by WSPU.

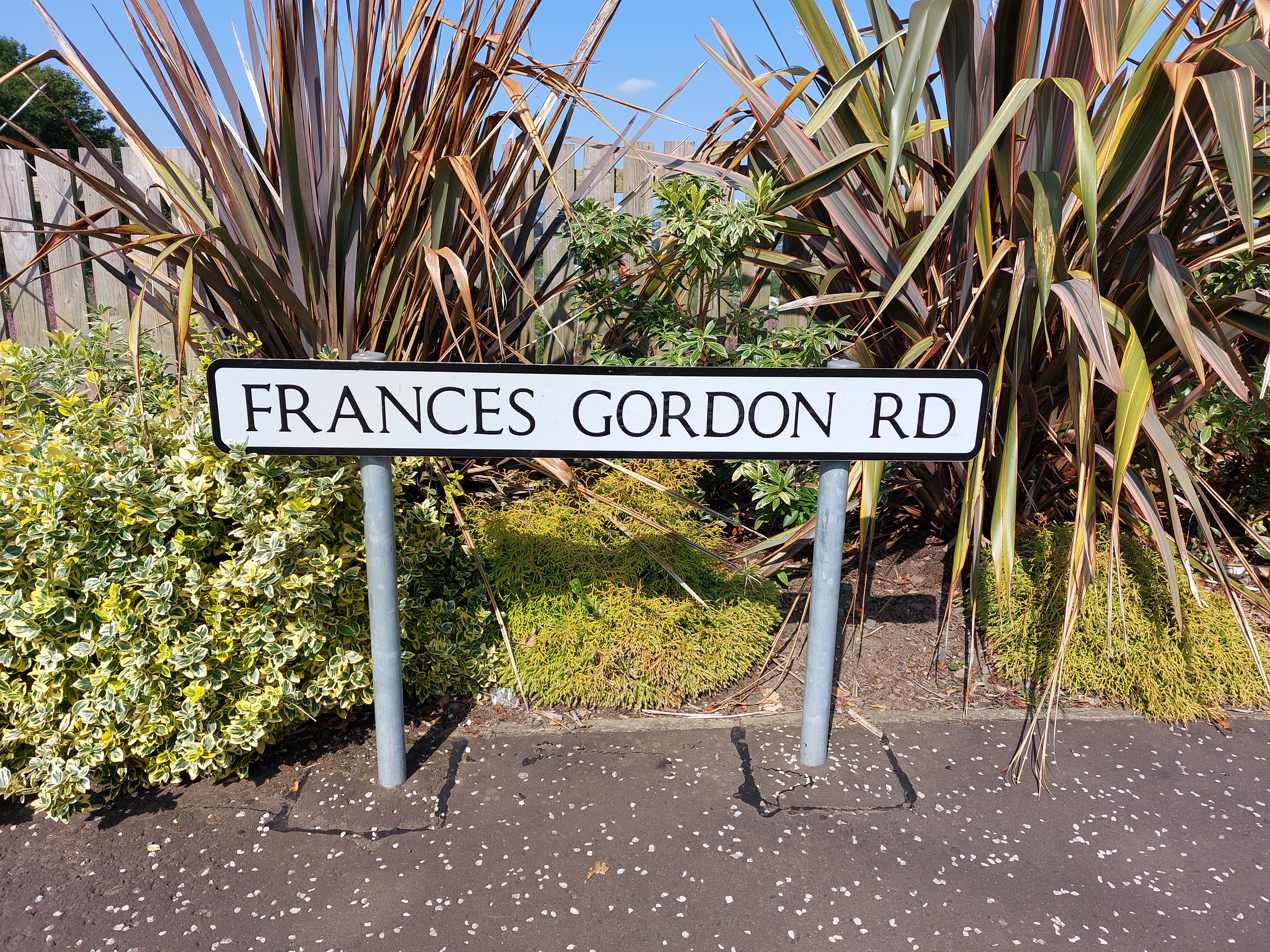
Frances Gordon Road in Perth, Scotland

On 10 August 1914, not long after the outbreak of the First World War, the British government ordered that all prisoners convicted of suffrage agitation be released. Three days after this, Emmeline Pankhurst called an end to all militancy stating "it has been decided to economise the Union's energies and financial resources by a temporary suspension of activities."

== Later life and legacy ==
Gordon was with her sister Ada J. Graves in Kalighat, India when the Srimangal earthquake struck on 8 July 1918. Graves died trying to save her daughter, not realising that the girl had already been taken to safety by a nanny. Gordon survived the earthquake.

In 2010, the story of the four suffragettes – Scott, Gordon, Parker and Maude Edwards – at Perth prison was turned into a stage play, Cat and Mouse, by playwright Ajay Close.

In 2014 a public street in Perth, Frances Gordon Road, was dedicated to her. An adjacent street, Ethel Moorhead Place, was named after fellow suffragette.

== See also ==
- Women's Social and Political Union.
- Suffragette
- Women's suffrage in the United Kingdom
- Arabella Scott
- Fanny Parker
- Ada J. Graves. Sister
