= Maude Edwards =

Scottish feminist and suffragette

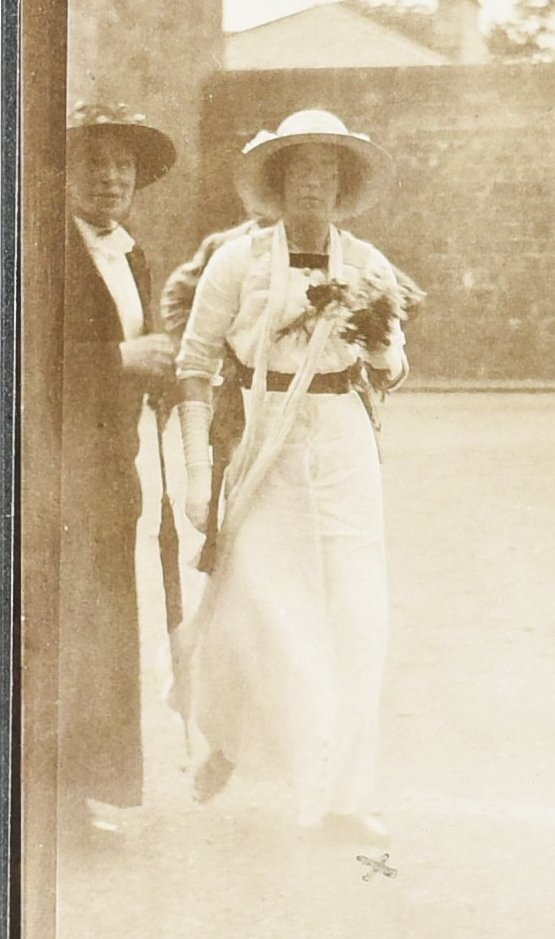
- Photograph of Maude Edwards, suffragette prisoner.
- Known for: Suffragette imprisoned for slashing a portrait of King George V

Maude Edwards was a Scottish feminist and suffragette. She was imprisoned in Perth Prison in 1914 for slashing John Lavery’s portrait of King George V hanging in the Royal Scottish Academy in Edinburgh. She was force-fed in prison despite having a heart condition.

== Campaigning for women's suffrage ==
Maude Edwards was tried before a jury in Edinburgh Sheriff Court charged with slashing a portrait by John Lavery on 23 May 1914. The picture, A Portrait Study of the King for The Royal Family at Buckingham Palace, 1913, was one which the king himself had approved.

The portrait had been hanging in "the Great Room" in the Royal Scottish Academy in Edinburgh, mounted on a special screen surmounted with a gilt curtain and crown. Edwards, described as a "shabbily dressed woman" in a cloak had put watchers off due to the keen interest she took in the exhibits, peering through "her thick spectacles" at the pictures. She had taken a hatchet to the portrait in full view of everyone; striking it "in the left breast and immediately below where the medals and decorations worn by the king are placed." She had acted in response to Mrs Pankhurst’s failed attempt to lead a deputation to the King at the gates of Buckingham Palace and Edwards stated that it had taken a "lot of nerve to do such work".

Since early 1913 militant suffragettes had been trying to bring the suffrage question to the attention of King George V.

- In June 1913, Emily Wilding Davison had died after being run down at the Epsom Derby as she tried to grasp the bridle of the King’s racehorse.
- In October 1913, petitioners disrupted the royal wedding of Princess Alexandra.
- In December 1913, a gala performance of Jeanne d’Arc was commandeered by protesters.

Yet the King was not moved to hear the suffragettes' arguments. So by the time of the aborted Buckingham Palace deputation in May 1914, he'd become deeply unpopular.

The assault by Maude Edwards on Lavery’s portrait of the king, therefore, remains "the most credible example of an attack undertaken to cause symbolic personal harm... the most vehement protests that she could have committed without overstepping the line into actual blood-letting. The fact that her hatchet-blow was aimed at the chest area of the image is perhaps indicative of her intentions."

== The trial of Maude Edwards ==
The indictment read:

MAUDE EDWARDS, 27 Frederick Street, Edinburgh, you are indicted at the instance of the Right Honourable Robert Munro, his Majesty's Advocate, and the charge against you is that on 23rd May 1914, in the Royal Scottish Academy Gallery, The Mound, Edinburgh, you did wilfully and maliciously strike and cut with a hatchet and damage a Portrait of His Majesty King George the Fifth, by John Lavery R S A.

By Authority of His Majesty's Advocate,

[signed] Henry H Brown

Procurator Fiscal

A brief account of the trial was described in the Edinburgh Evening Dispatch.

STORMY COURT SCENES EXTRAORDINARY PROCEEDINGS AT EDINBURGH TRIAL SUFFRAGETTE SENTENCED

Extraordinary scenes were witnessed in Edinburgh Sheriff Court to-day...The accused immediately on being put into the dock commenced a running fire of commentary on the Court procedure, which she kept up during the course of the trial, which lasted for twenty minutes. Over a score of police were on duty in various parts of the Court, while a similar number of plain clothes constables were also prepared for eventualities. On entering the Court loud applause from a large number of suffragettes, who occupied the Court, greeted the accused, while cheers were raised on her name being called.

When asked to answer the indictment, which charged her with having, on 23rd May, in the Royal Scottish Academy, wilfully and maliciously struck and cut with a hatchet and damaged a portrait of his Majesty King George V, by John Lavery, RSA, the accused shouted to his Lordship, "I will not be tried. I am not going to listen to you or anyone whatever."

The Sheriff - I take this as a plea of not guilty. (Applause in Court.)

The courtroom was cleared and a number of Edwards' supporters had to be forcibly ejected, raising a "rousing cheer" as they left. Grace Cadell, doctor and suffrage campaigner, attended the trial and when the Sheriff, Lord Maconachie, ordered the court to be cleared, she was reported by the press to have resisted so strongly that it had required the efforts of three police officers to remove her.

=== Maude Edwards on her own - "a sufficient witness in herself" ===
When the court had finally cleared, the Sheriff then directed a question to the Clerk of the Court to which Edwards responded.

The Sheriff replied "I am not talking to you."

'But I am speaking to you,' replied Miss Edwards, 'and that makes all the difference. One day we shall sit in judgment on you. This is nothing but a Star Chamber. What about Arabella Scott? Why is she being forcibly fed? I am going to talk all day, and it will do you good.'

The first witness was called, but was all but inaudible owing to Miss Edwards' protests. Subsequent witnesses had to give their evidence standing close beside the jury. When it came time for the case for the defence to be heard, Edwards was asked if she had any witness for her defence. She replied that she had none, and that she was sufficient witness in herself.

The jury returned a verdict of guilty, and Sheriff-Principal Maconochie passed sentence of three months imprisonment.

Miss Edwards cried that neither three months nor fifty years' sentence would make any difference to her. She was taken to Calton Gaol, where pickets were already stationed. Within three hours, however, she was removed to Perth Prison.

== Perth Prison ==
Edwards was sent to Perth Prison on 3 July 1914 to serve her three month sentence.

The next day, she was examined by the medical officer who recorded that she was in a ‘somewhat hysterical state’. He paid no heed to her medical certificate that stated she had a weak heart as it was written by a lady doctor who, in his opinion, could not judge the present situation. Edwards went on hunger strike fully expecting that her medical certificate would exempt her from force feeding.

On 5 July, Edwards was force fed hot sweet milk and eggs by tube and her condition was monitored. No adverse effects were recorded so her feeding continued. Five days later, she had had enough and submitted a handwritten request to the Prison Commissioners to be liberated under licence according to the terms of the Cat and Mouse Act.

The note read:

No. 76 HM Prison Perth

July 10th 1914

Prisoner's Name & Reg. No. Maude Edwards

I herewith beg to make an application to be liberated on licence on the understanding that I give an undertaking to refrain from militancy in the future. My special reason for making such an offer is the fact that the medical officer of the prison tells me that excitement is injurious to my health. Maude Edwards.

She was released on 14 July 1914.

== Legacy ==
The story of four suffragette prisoners at Perth prison - Maude Edwards, Arabella Scott, Frances Gordon and Frances Parker and the doctor who force-fed them, Dr. Hugh Ferguson-Watson - was made into a play by Ajay Close. The play is called Cat and Mouse.

== See also ==
- Arabella Scott
- Frances Gordon
- Ethel Moorhead
- The Cat and Mouse Act
- Women's Social and Political Union.
- Suffragette
- Women's suffrage in the United Kingdom
