= Ethel Moorhead =

British suffragette and painter (1869–1955)

- Born: Ethel Agnes Mary Moorhead; 28 August 1869; Maidstone, Kent, England
- Died: 4 March 1955 (aged 85); Blackrock, Dublin, Ireland
- Occupations: Painter, Suffragette
- Known for: hunger strike and force feeding activism, and portraiture
- Movement: Women's Social and Political Union Women's Freedom League National Service Organisation
- Parents: George A. Moorhead (father); Margaret Humphreys (mother)
- Relatives: Alice Moorhead (Sister), George, John, Arthur & Rupert (Brothers)
- Awards: Hunger Strike Medal for Valour

Ethel Agnes Mary Moorhead (28 August 1869 – 4 March 1955) was a British suffragette and painter and was the first suffragette in Scotland to be forcibly-fed.

She was also a patron of This Quarter, a journal published by Ernest Walsh. The journal featured writers such as Ernest Hemingway, James Joyce and Ezra Pound.

== Early life ==
Moorhead was born on 28 August 1869 in Fisher Street, Maidstone, Kent. She was one of six children of Brigadier Surgeon George Alexander Moorhead, an army surgeon of Irish Catholic birth, and his wife, Margaret Humphreys (1833–1902), an Irish woman of French-Huguenot ancestry, whom he had married in India, at Madras Roman Catholic Cathedral on 9 September 1864.

Her maternal grandfather was Captain John Goulin Humphreys, a Napoleonic Wars veteran and in an earlier generation one of her mother's family (Pierre Goulin) fought in the 1690 Battle of the Boyne.

Her older sister Alice Moorhead (1868–1910) was a pioneer of female medicine, trained as a surgeon and physician, and four of her brothers were doctors, as were several male members of her father's family.

Her father was posted with the Berkshire Regiment to Afghanistan as army surgeon in 1870, and she would have seen little of him in her early years, from his time in India in the post-mutiny years to being promoted to Surgeon-Major when Moorhead was just four years old. The family lived in Shoeburyness in Kent and then he was posted to Port Louis, Mauritius and retired as Brigadier-Surgeon in 1880, and they moved to Galway, where the children were schooled. When her brothers George Oliver and Arthur and sister Alice were studying medicine in Edinburgh, from 1888 to 1894, the family were at 20 Windsor Street, Edinburgh. Then the family were in St. Helier, Jersey before going to Glasgow, where another brother, Rupert, studied medicine, before her father settled at 20 Magdalen Yard Road, Dundee from 1900 and so in 1902 lived closer to Alice and her newly created Dundee Women's Hospital. The family then moved temporarily to Pitalpin House, Lochee and in 1907 moved into the newly built 'The Wiesha' at Hazel Drive, Dundee, where Moorhead was able to have a studio.

== Career ==
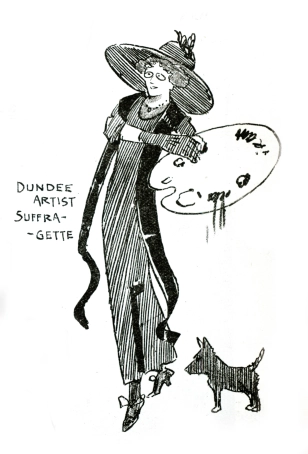
Ethel Moorhead in the March 1912 edition of "Wizard of the North" magazine

After training as an artist, when she was 29, in Paris under Mucha and in Whistler's studio, the Atelier Carmen, between October 1898 and April 1901, with fellow Dundee painter, Janet Oliphant, Moorhead returned to Dundee and set up a portrait studio with Oliphant where she worked for fifteen years, in The Arcade, 4 King Street. Both joined the Dundee Graphic Art Association, Oliphant as an associate, Moorhead as ordinary member up to 1909. Moorhead's first exhibition was a landscape and six other pictures, in the Centennial Exhibition in 1901, with the local press, including the Dundee Advertiser praising her work as among the 'gems of the collection from an artistic point of view.' Her mother died in 1902, and she took over the care for her father from 1908 (after Alice married, with Ethel as a witness) and she often used her father as a model, one titled Brigade Surgeon G. A. Moorhead was described as 'in the way of portraiture.. nothing finer.. a triumph of art' in the Courier, and Moorhead knowing the sitter made a difference, said the Evening Telegraph. The Celtic Annual described her as a 'most refined and distinguished artist' and at her last exhibition with the Dundee Graphic Artists, the pricing for paintings increased.

Her sister Alice died in childbirth in 1910, and her father then died in 1911; both were buried with her mother in Dundee's Western Cemetery.

Moorhead moved to Edinburgh, staying at 12 Queen Street. She exhibited works at even higher prices in Glasgow in 1912, with four paintings at the Glasgow Institute of Fine Arts. One of her portraits,The Conspirator, was chosen to be exhibited in the Royal Scottish Academy along with two others, and three were shown at the Aberdeen Artists' Society and she had works in the Walker Art Gallery, Liverpool. A portrait of a dog by Moorhead (dated 1915 or 1916) is in Missouri, USA.

Moorhead joined her friend Oliphant on the Lochee Day Nursery management committee and volunteered at the Grey Lodge Settlement at Hilltown which provided a variety of social support services, especially for young mothers.

== Suffragette campaigning ==
Moorhead (when aged 41) made her maiden speech at a Dundee Women’s Social and Political Union (WSPU) meeting in March 1910; in December she accused Winston Churchill of 'brutal treatment' of suffragette hunger strikers and threw an egg at him during a meeting in Dundee, and she hit the organisers trying to remove her with an umbrella. In 1911, Ethel Moorhead took part in he WSPU's census resistance: when a registrar visited her family home to correct this, she refused to co-operate and rang a bell to interfere with his attempt to collect information from her father. When he persisted, she snatched the Schedule from his hand and threw it into the fire. In the following year the Dundee branch of the Women's Freedom League congratulated her on becoming Dundee's first tax-resister. Sheriff officers came to take goods in lieu of taxes to be auctioned (a silver candelabra), with Moorhead's supporters waving placards saying "No Vote, No Tax" and making fun of the bidding process.

Moorhead used a string of aliases ('Mary Humphreys', 'Edith Johnston', 'Margaret Morrison'), and carried out various acts of militancy both north and south of the border. They included smashing two windows in London, with Mrs. Enid Rennie from Broughty Ferry (eventually sentenced to two months) and Florence McFarlane, a nurse who lived in the Nethergate, Dundee (sentenced to four months), and Moorhead's target was a Thomas Cook Fleet Street shop (but in the subsequent trial, despite arresting her, their witnesses got confused). On arrest she is reported as saying 'I am a householder without a vote. I came from Scotland at great personal inconvenience to myself to help my comrades.' The women found guilty were taken straight to Holloway Prison where Moorhead noted in her memoirs Incendiaries, that the bed was a 'board for sleeping on had a blanket decorated with arrowheads, the badge of the condemned.' Due to lack of evidence from the shopkeepers, she was one of those who were released after the trial.

Later that year, Moorhead was caught attacking a showcase containing a historical sword at the Wallace Monument near Stirling, with a stone wrapped in a note saying 'YOUR LIBERTIES WERE WON BY THE SWORD. RELEASE THE WOMEN WHO ARE FIGHTING FOR THEIR LIBERTIES. A PROTEST FROM DUBLIN' and was arrested under the name 'Edith Johnston'. This action was defended by Muriel Scott and Elizabeth Finlayson Gauld at an open air gathering a week later.

At her trial 'Johnston" said 'she was not guilty but approved of the woman who had done it.' and “Your liberties were won with the sword. That sword was a mere symbol just as the stones and hammers with which women are fighting for their freedom and which they shall win." She was fined £2 or seven days in prison, choosing the latter, she was in Stirling then Perth prison, where she was given the 'privilege of wearing her own clothes, and having books' but continued to refuse to obey prison rules, and kept complaining and it was said by the authorities that the 'complaint is made for the sole purpose of carrying out the avowed policy of the Suffragists to cause trouble.' Moorhead responded that officials 'should not be encouraged to try to coerce prisoners into submission to Rules which only apply to Criminals.' The women's suffrage supporters had long considered they should be treated as political prisoners.

In October 1912 after being ejected from a meeting in Synod Hall, Edinburgh, where Sir Rufus Isaacs was speaking, Moorhead returned to attack the male lecturer from Broughton School at his work, with a dog whip to attack him in return for having ejected her. Letters to the press objected at the physical violence to eject women who were simply wanting to question speakers, and others from the crowds who cheered on and supported the violence. She was arrested for this attack under her own name, and was fined £1, which was paid, so Moorhead never went to prison for her action.

The next month, 29 November 1912, Moorhead (in the name of 'Mary Humphrys') and Fanny Parker, whom she had befriended in prison before, and Olive Wharry (under the name of 'Joyce Locke') and Emily Davison (under the name of 'Mary Brown') along with minister's daughter Mary Pollock Grant (under the name of 'Marian Pollock') planned that some women may be able to get into the Liberal Association meeting in Aberdeen where Chancellor of the Exchequer Lloyd George was to be speaking. Moorhead and Davison were to attack outside but went for the wrong person, and Moorhead broke a car window, but all of the group were arrested. Again Moorhead conducted her own defence including requesting that Lloyd George be called as a witness. She was fined (40 shillings) or to be imprisoned (ten days) for damage to property, which she chose. This was the first time she went on a hunger strike, but with the others was released early as the fines had been paid, anonymously. Moorhead wrote to the press (The Scotsman) complaining about prison conditions on remand and in the Aberdeen gaol which led to questions to the Secretary of State in Parliament, as the complaint was about pre-trial behaviour by the police.

She had a reputation for wrecking police cells, and carrying out several arson attacks. Moorhead had thrown cayenne pepper at a police constable at an event where Prime Minister Asquith was due to speak, and was taken to Methil and then Dundee prison, where she caused an amount of damage by breaking windows. Early in 1913, she tried to write to Arabella Scott who lived at 88 Marchmont Road, Edinburgh about an incident of an amorous approach by an inebriated prison doctor, which she feared would be used as propaganda. The Dundee Gaol governor did not release it. Again her trial resulted in some disorder from her refusal to recognise the proceedings and a sentence of £20 or thirty days (which she chose). She went on hunger strike and refused to assist a medical examination, after four days, and so she was discharged. In another hearing in Edinburgh, Moorhead said to the judge 'I want to say this is another Court of Injustice' and (addressing Lord Chief Justice) 'you are an unjust old man'

She engaged in repeated complaint correspondence with prison and law authorities about her treatment on remand for protesting for women's suffrage, about the prison conditions, lack of respect from the staff and about the cruelty of the force-feeding.

On 23 July 1913, with Dorothea Chalmers Smith, Moorhead (in the alias 'Margaret Morrison') attempted to set fire to a house at 6 Park Gardens in Glasgow, but they were caught at the scene and the firefighters found flammable materials and a postcard bearing the words: 'A protest against Mrs Pankhurst's re-arrest'. In this trial, Moorhead tried to object that the judge had misdirected the jury and she was removed for contempt of court, but brought back to hear the sentence of eight months imprisonment. At this point she turned to the sympathetic suffragette attendees and shouted "No Surrender" which resulted in chaos in the court as others joined in shouting, throwing apples, singing aloud The Marseillaise and so three more arrests were made. The Glasgow Herald ran a cartoon titled 'Hallowe'en at the High Court'. Moorhead held no formal position in the WSPU, but had achieved great personal notoriety. Her brother Rupert became doctor to the Blathwayt family at Eagle House, the suffragettes rest at Batheaston, near Bath, but was no sympathiser to the suffragette 'hooligans' as he called them in 1908, but he was said to be generous in foregoing fees to poorer patients.

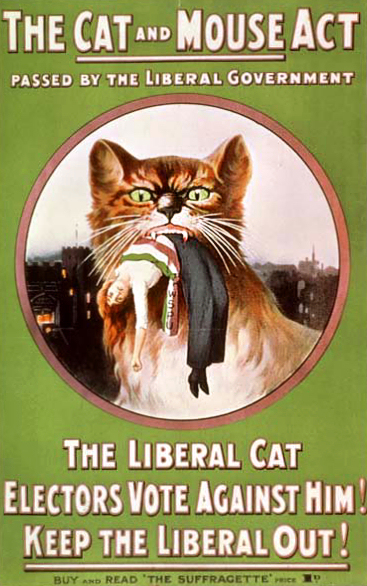
Cat and Mouse Act Poster 1914

Moorhead herself was imprisoned several times and released under the "Cat and Mouse Act" of 1913.

She had become known as the first Scottish suffragette to be forcibly fed, while imprisoned in Calton Jail Edinburgh under the care of Dr Hugh Ferguson Watson, although the initial feeding was performed by Dr James Dunlop, medical adviser to HM Prison Commissioners for Scotland, who was based at Morningside Asylum.

Having been force fed more than 25 times, over a week or so, Moorhead become seriously ill with double pneumonia, and had even been given absolution by the prison chaplain. Her solicitor intervened and she was handed a bunch of sweet peas from fellow suffragette Arabella Scott as she was at last released into the care of Dr Grace Cadell, a fellow activist in the suffrage movement. Arriving at Cadell's home, 145 Leith Walk, 150 police had been awaiting a demonstration, but none arose, although a call had gone out earlier in the Dundee Courier letters page from Emily Pankhurst and Lila Clunas and in The Scotsman an advert inviting 'thousands' to march from Charlotte Square to Calton Prison, along Princes Street in protest at Moorhead's treatment (but she had already been released by the set time). Despite the many well wishers, she was so weak that she only allowed visits from Dr Mabel Jones or her Broughty Ferry friend, Enid Rennie, who had written to Dr. Devon who had been the lead prison doctor who latterly conducted the force feeding, that it was 'a permanent blot on the record of so many fights for liberty in which Scotland has hitherto born a noble part'. Elizabeth Gauld, Janie Allan and others wrote to object and his responses showed he would prefer to consider her 'mad'. The arson at Whitekirk Church was said by Allan to be a revenge for Moorhead's treatment. Her prison force feeding experiences – duly related to the press – caused much protest at the cruelty involved. Her treatment and resultant activism was raised in Parliament, the Secretary of State asked on two occasions about the treatment and 'her life being endangered'.

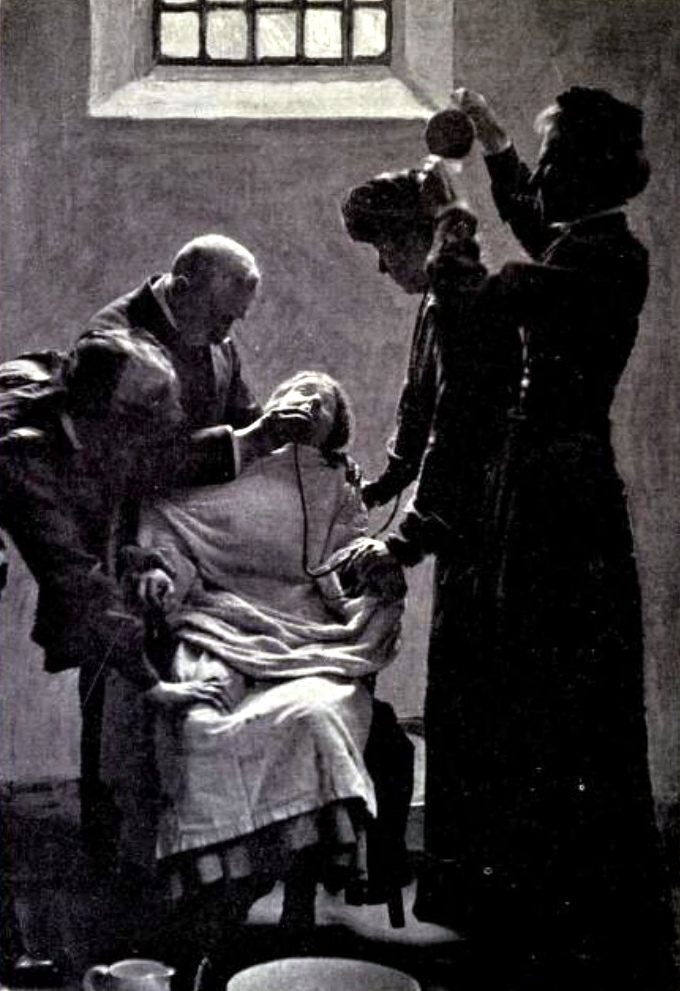
Force feeding of suffragettes

Moorhead 'escaped' re-arrest by leaving Cadell's home in disguise, with Leith Police issuing a warrant.

These prison experiences did not stop her militant activity, however, and along with her friend Fanny Parker she was arrested in July 1914, for trying to blow up the Burns Cottage in Alloway. Moorhead escaped by bicycle as Fanny was said to have allowed herself to be arrested to save her friend. Another arson attributed to her for which she was never caught was at Carmichael (Cairngyffe) Church, Lanarkshire. Her own memoirs were called Incendiaries and did not find favour with her brothers. But brother Arthur, who died in Batheaston, staying with Rupert, in 1916, left her £2152 in trust in his will.

Moorhead had been given a Hunger Strike Medal 'for Valour' by WSPU, with dated silver bars for 29 August 2012, 29 November 1912, 29 January 2013, 15 October 2015. And the silk lined box has imprinted in gold lettering:

'Presented to Ethel Agnes Moorhead in recognition of a gallant action whereby through endurance to the last extremity of hunger and hardship a great principle of political justice was vindicated.'

== Other campaigning and later life ==
During the First World War, Moorhead took on additional organisational responsibilities. Together with Fanny Parker, she helped run the Women's Freedom League (WFL) National Service Organisation, encouraging women to find appropriate war work from an office at 144 High Street, Holburn, London. Their contribution was praised by founder Charlotte Despard at a rally in Kingsway Hall, September 1915 as “The competent women who direct the work inspire an immense confidence by their keen intelligence, lively sympathy and brisk business capacity”.

In the 1920s, she travelled in Europe and lived in 1918–19 at 5 Burgh Quay, Dublin. Moorhead rented a house 'Windgates' in Wicklow. She edited a quarterly arts journal, This Quarter which published work by, among others, James Joyce, Ezra Pound and Ernest Hemingway, Constantin Brancusi, Francis Picabia and Man Ray. By 1920, she was back near Dundee, at Bonnyton House, Arbirlot which her sister Alice's medical partner Dr. Emily Thomson owned. And from 1922 to 1926, at 36 George Street, Edinburgh although she was often in France. Little more is known until she died in Dublin in 1955.

== Legacy ==
A commemorative plaque has been placed close to the site of her studio in Dundee (site of the King Street Arcade at the corner of King Street and St Roque’s Lane, near the underpass).

A film based on her life is available for private view at the National Library of Scotland.

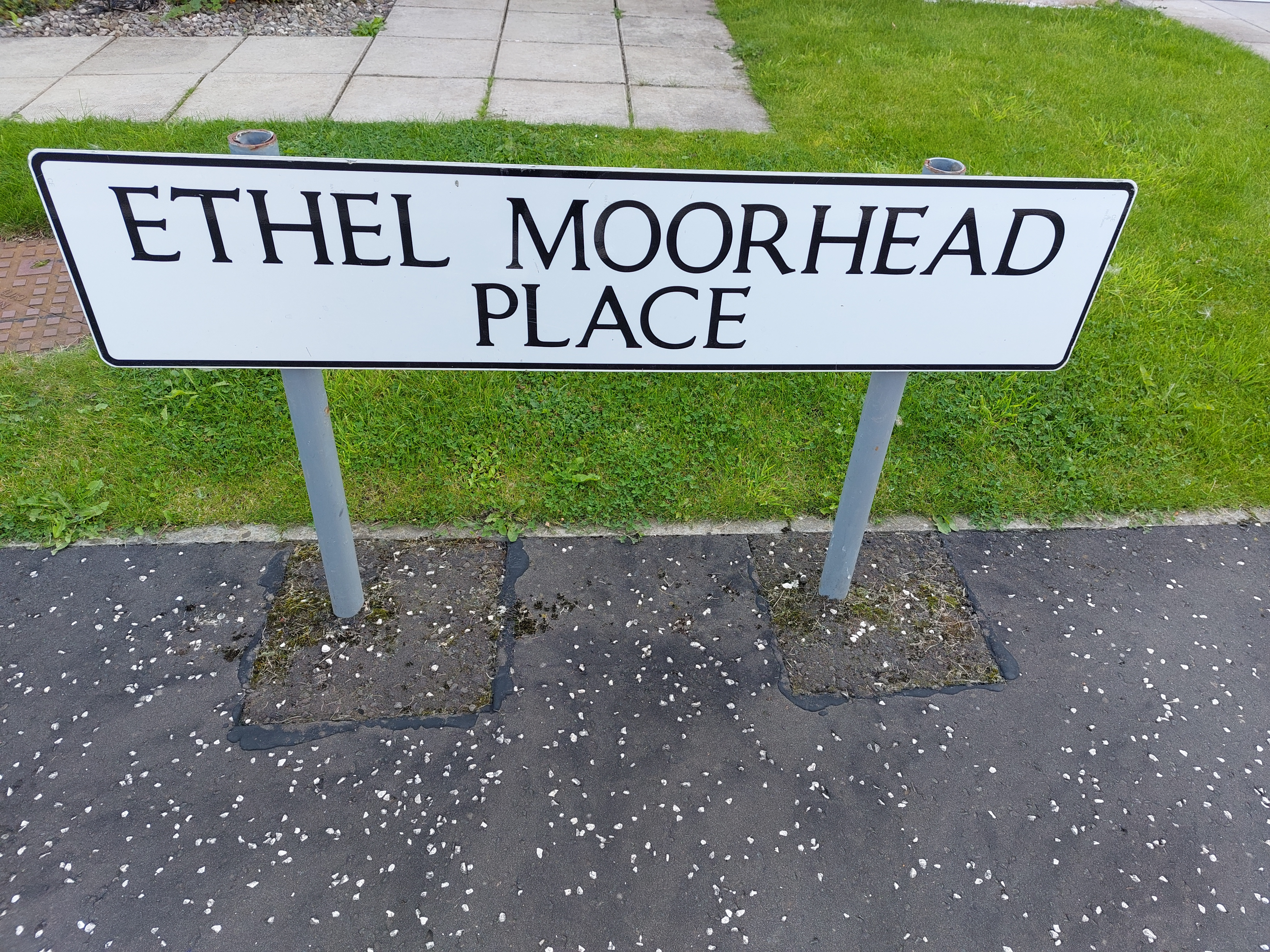
Ethel Moorhead Place in Perth, Scotland

The Scottish Records Office has Moorhead's prison-related correspondence, which was exhibited in 2018, as part of an Edinburgh Festival Fringe exhibition marking the centenary of the Representation of the People Act 1918, at the National Records of Scotland (NRS) called ‘Malicious Mischief? Women’s Suffrage in Scotland’, describing suffragettes and suffragists, their different approach and experiences and the timeline of the case for women's suffrage.

In 2014 a public street in Perth, Ethel Moorhead Place, was named after her. An adjacent street, Frances Gordon Road, was named after fellow suffragette Frances Gordon.

In 2024, a housing development in Hilltown, Dundee was completed which included a pedestrian street named Moorhead Street, commemorating Ethel Moorhead.

== See also ==
- List of suffragists and suffragettes
- Hunger Strike Medal
- Annie Walker Craig, with whom Moorhead conspired to burn buildings in Upper Strathearn, Comrie.
