= Muriel Scott =

Scottish suffragette (1888–1963)

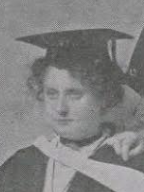
- Born: Muriel Eleanor Scott; 1888; Dum Dum, British Raj
- Died: 1963 (aged 74–75)
- Other names: Jane C. Dark, Ellen Smith
- Education: University of Edinburgh
- Organisation(s): Edinburgh National Society for Women's Suffrage; Women's Freedom League; Women's Social and Political Union
- Known for: suffragette, hunger striker, protest organiser and speaker
- Movement: Women's suffrage
- Criminal status: Imprisoned for obstruction
- Relatives: Sister Arabella Scott

Muriel Eleanor Scott (1888–1963), was a Scottish suffragette, hunger striker, and protest organiser. Her sister Arabella Scott was force-fed many times, and Muriel Scott led protests about this cruel treatment.

== Family and education ==
Muriel Eleanor Scott was born in 1888 in Dum Dum, India (in what was then the British Raj), but her family home was Dunoon, Scotland. Her father Captain William Scott served in India for 25 years and her mother was Harriet Scott née Buchanan. Muriel Scott had seven siblings, two of whom died in infancy: Isabella Harriet Scott *died at birth, Isabella Harriet Scott (*), Alice Margaret Scott, Arabella Charlotte Scott, Agnes Buchanan Scott *died at 8months, William Buchanan Scott, Agnes Mary Scott*. (Note: *often people named a subsequent child after a lost infant.

Scott and her sister Arabella Scott both studied at University of Edinburgh in 1908. Muriel Scott returned to the University to study Russian in 1916.

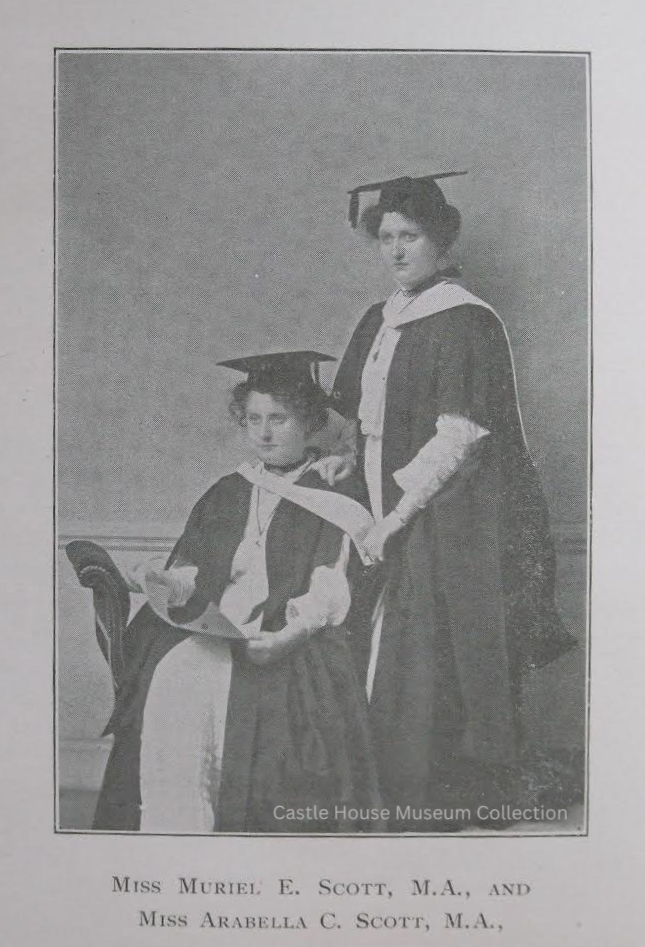
Muriel and Arabella Scott, graduating from the University of Edinburgh. From the Castle House Museum Collection.

== Suffrage activism ==
Whilst students, Scott and her sister campaigned for women's rights and joined the Edinburgh National Society for Women's Suffrage (ENSWS), Women's Social and Political Union (WSPU) and the Women's Freedom League. The Scott sisters spoke at political events across Scotland.

Like other notable suffragettes, Muriel Scott used aliases in case she was arrested, for example Jane C. Dark, Ellen Smith, and also when she was campaigning at by-elections. She spoke against the Liberal Prime Minister Asquith when he was the sitting candidate in an election at East Fife.

Muriel Scott was arrested in London in June 1909 with her sister Arabella, both were charged with obstruction, after attempting to give a petition to Prime Minister Asquith. She was sentenced to 21 days hard labour in Holloway Prison. Scott went on hunger strike but was released, and stayed with an aunt in Kent, prior to returning at her mother's request, home to Edinburgh.

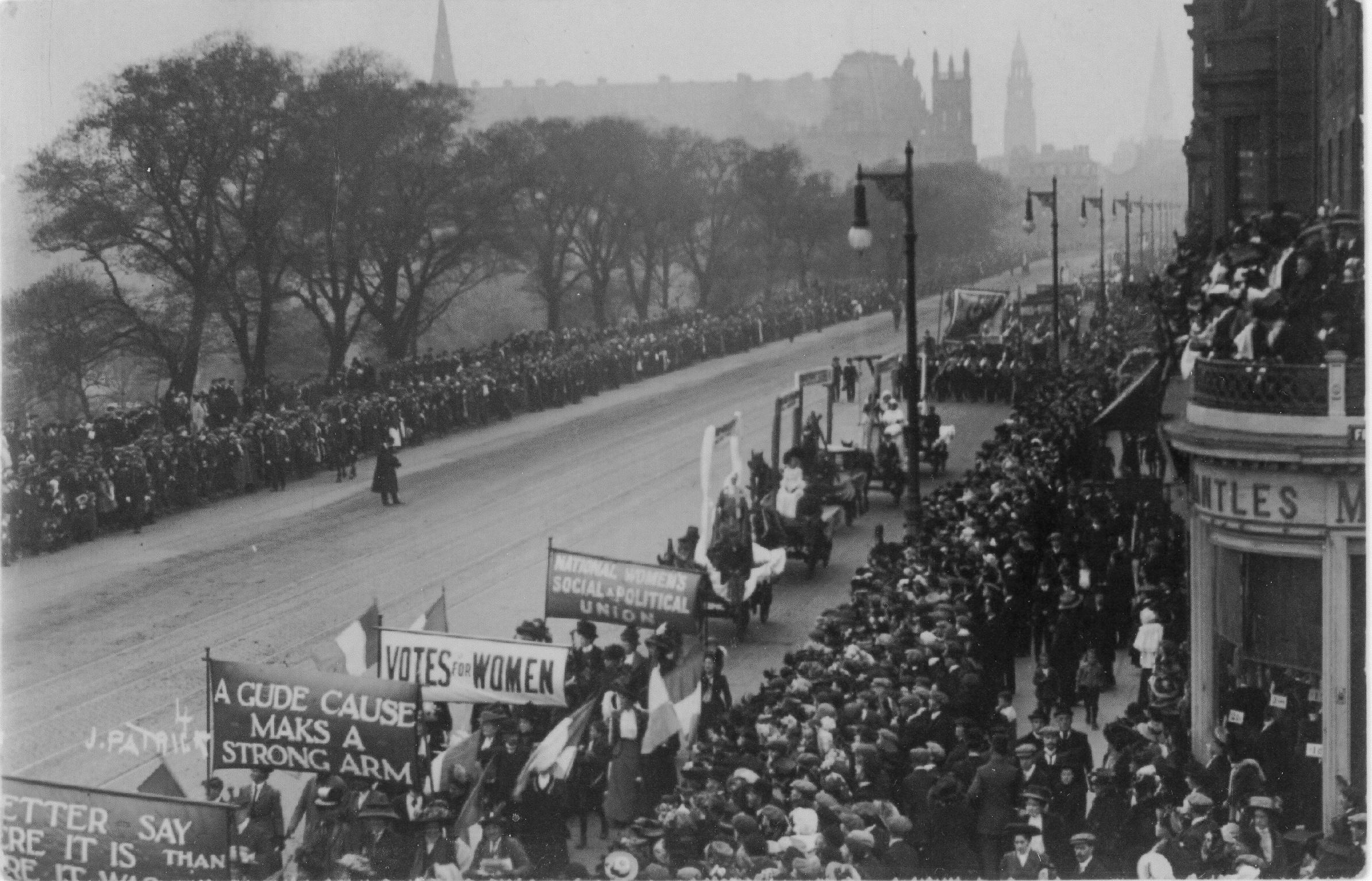
Great Procession and Women's Demonstration 1909, Princes Street Edinburgh

Scott helped to organise the October 1909 Edinburgh suffrage procession, which attracted huge crowds, ten deep along Princes Street, with the march being described as 'a solid phalanx of resolute and unflinching womanhood bent upon obtaining the vote'.

She did not get involved in further militant activities, but organised and spoke at public meetings or interrupted political events, e.g. when she and Arabella padlocked themselves to their seats so that they not be easily ejected. In 1911, Scott was thanked for giving up her school holiday to speak to a crowd of 600 at a Kilmarnock Burghs by-election event. In 1912, Scott addressed a large open air meeting in Dunfermline.

Along with fellow Edinburgh activist, Elizabeth Finlayson Gauld, Scott was in Stirling on 7 September 1912, again speaking outdoors from a hackney cab, which was decorated in the WSPU colours (purple, white and green). The women were defending action by fellow suffragette Ethel Moorhead (alias Edith Johnson), who the previous week had damaged a sword display at the Wallace Monument museum, they stated that: 'the daughters of that brave man (Wallace), the daughters of this great nation, had still a great and overwhelming desire for liberty' Scottish suffragettes often sang at their meetings 'Scots Wha Hae', a political freedom song about Wallace by Robert Burns.

In 1913, whilst living at 88 Marchmont Road, Edinburgh, the suffragette sisters were being kept under surveillance, and the police noted them both leaving, carrying a package. Later Arabella Scott was arrested for setting fire (with others) to the Kelso Racecourse stand.

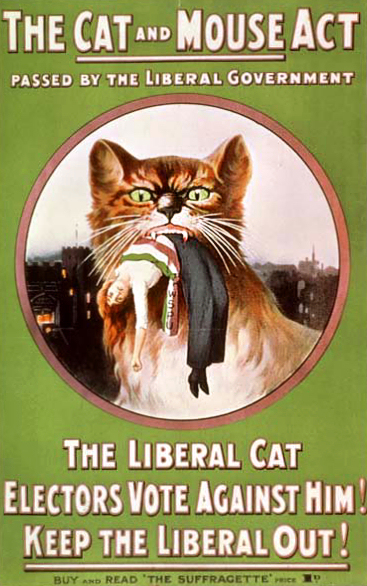
Cat and Mouse Act poster 1914

Arabella Scott was arrested, released and re-captured a number of times, under the 'Cat and Mouse' Act, where starving and force-fed prisoners were allowed out to recuperate but expected to return to complete their full sentences.

=== Perth Prison protests ===
In June 1914, Muriel Scott wrote to the prison authorities asking where they held Arabella. When she found out it was in Perth, and that Arabella was on a hunger strike and was at risk of force-feeding, Muriel Scott led a group of 3,000 protestors to the gates of Perth Prison to object to this cruel treatment. This raised sympathy for the women within the town, and due to the size of the protest, and risk of disturbances, police from across Scotland were called in to help. Arabella however wrote on 21 July 1914, that she did not want any personal attacks on the prison staff.

Her sister was released later, but Muriel Scott told reporters that the protests on the streets would continue every night and that the WSPU were looking for premises in the town.

When World War One was declared in August 1914, the government pardoned all suffragette prisoners, including Arabella Scott.

== Later life and death ==
Scott later returned to university to study Russian in 1916. She died in 1963.

== In fiction ==
- A Petrol Scented Spring (2015) by Ajay Close imagined relations between Scott's sister Arabella and the Perth prison doctor Hugh Ferguson Watson.
