= Arabella Scott =

Scottish suffragette and hunger striker (1886–1980)

Arabella Charlotte Scott
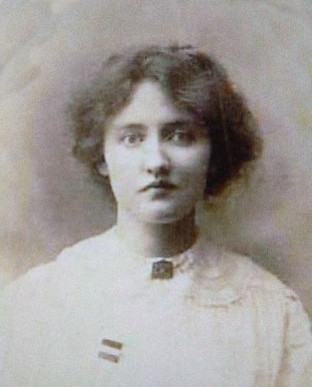
- Born: 7 May 1886; Dunoon, Scotland
- Died: 27 August 1980 (aged 94); Palmdale, New South Wales, Australia
- Education: University of Edinburgh
- Occupation: School teacher
- Known for: Suffragette Hunger Strike Medal
- Political party: Women's Social and Political Union (WSPU), Women's Freedom League (WFL), Edinburgh National Society for Women's Suffrage

Arabella Scott (7 May 1886 – 27 August 1980) was a Scottish teacher, suffragette hunger striker and women's rights campaigner. As a member of the Women's Freedom League (WFL) she took a petition to Downing Street in July 1909. She subsequently adopted more militant tactics with the Women's Social and Political Union (WSPU). She was one of a group who attempted arson at Kelso racecourse in May 1913. She was arrested many times and went on hunger strikes when she was sent to jail. Whilst in Perth Prison in 1914, she was force-fed for an extraordinarily long time under the supervision of Dr Hugh Ferguson Watson, the only prison doctor in Scotland prepared to use this method. She was released under the controversial Cat and Mouse Act. WSPU activism ceased when the First World War began and Scott became a field nurse, later she married emigrated to Australia. She wrote about her experiences in her autobiography A Murky Past.

== Early life and education ==
Arabella Charlotte Scott was born on 7 May 1886 in Dunoon, Scotland. Her mother was a teacher and her father served as a captain in the British army for more than 25 years.

She graduated with an MA from the University of Edinburgh along with her sister Muriel Scott and went on to become a school teacher in Leith, living with Muriel at 88 Marchmont Road in Edinburgh. Scott and her sisters were advocates for women's suffrage and were active speakers in Scotland for the cause, in particular at open air meetings, all over Scotland.

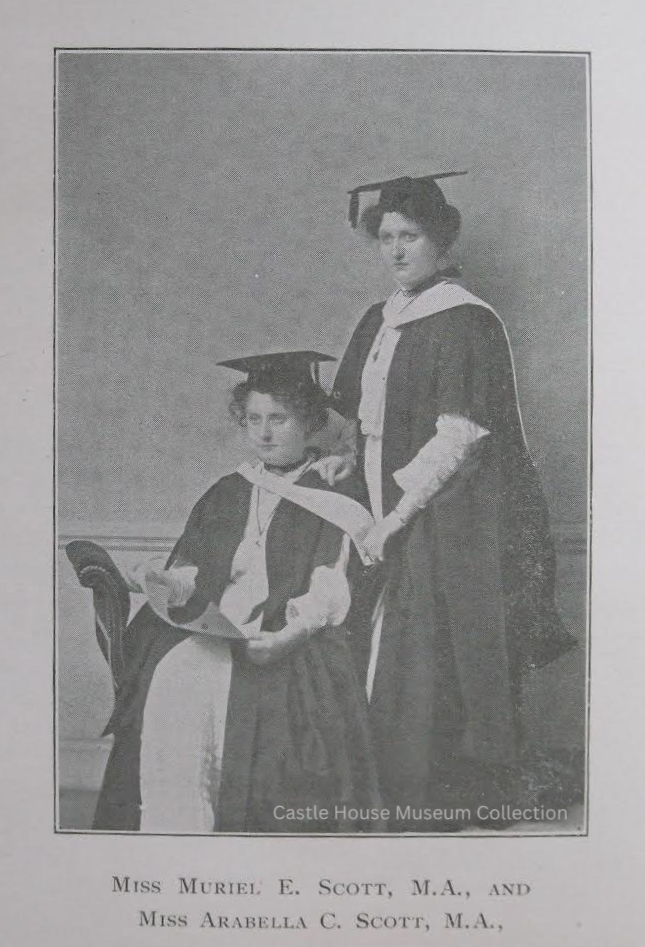
Graduation photo of Muriel and Arabella Scott, University of Edinburgh. Held in Castle House Museum archive, Dunoon.

== Campaigning for women's suffrage ==
Arabella Scott joined the Women's Freedom League during or before 1908. In the summer of that year and in the following year, she and her sister supported Hannah Mitchell's WFL campaigning in East Fife. She joined the group of WFL members taking a petition on women's suffrage to the British Prime Minister in Downing Street in 1909, which was the first time she was arrested. From 1909 to 1912, Scott continued to speak at open-air WFL meetings across Scotland. She then decided that the WFL was not going to achieve universal women's suffrage and joined the more militant Women's Social and Political Union both in Scotland and in the south of England, and was convicted of arson and other charges associated with militant action, and when in prison, Arabella Scott went on hunger strikes, and was awarded the Hunger Strike Medal.

=== Arrests and hunger strike ===
In July 1909, Arabella and her sister Muriel Scott were both arrested on the charge of obstruction in London after they tried to hand a petition to the Prime Minister H. H. Asquith, and were sentenced to serve 21 days at HM Prison Holloway.

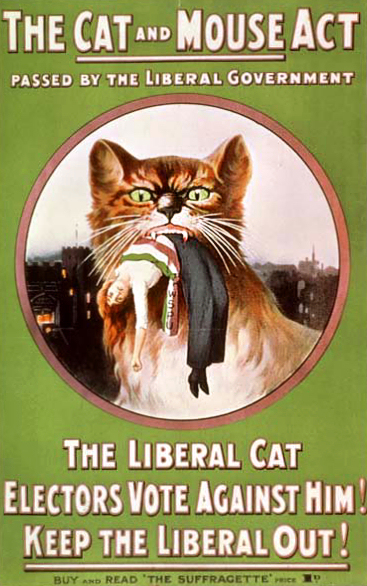
political image of 'Cat and Mouse' Act 1914

Arabella Scott was arrested and released several times over the following years, under the Prisoners (Temporary Discharge for Ill Health) Act 1913, known by suffragettes as the Cat and Mouse Act. The Act was brought in so that suffragettes could not die in prison due to hunger strikes, instead when they became too weak they were released on licence. They would be re-arrested at a later time to complete their sentences, if they did not return voluntarily or provide a current address and all Scottish police forces were informed of the need to find and arrest them, as per the case file.

On the 6 April 1913, Scott was arrested for trying to set fire to a racecourse stand at Kelso Racecourse along with Agnes and Elizabeth Thomson, Edith Hudson, and Donald McEwan. Following their trial, at Jedburgh Sheriff Court on 19 May 1913, Arabella Scott, Edith Hudson and Donald McEwan were sentenced to nine months, Elizabeth Thompson, three months, and Agnes was released. They were imprisoned at Calton Gaol Edinburgh and the women went on hunger strike. Scott was released under the Cat and Mouse Act on 24 May but when her licence ran out she failed to return to Calton Gaol, as reported by the prison governor to the H.M. Prison Commissioners.

Scott was caught on 12 June 1913 at the house of sympathiser Miss de Pass and rearrested, when she returned to Calton Gaol she went on hunger strike again. She only served a few days of her sentence, as on 16 June she was assessed as too weak by a medical officer and was released on licence again but did not return to the jail. Scott was found in London on the 24 August and returned to Calton Gaol where she went on hunger and thirst strike. On 28 August the medical officer put her forward for immediate discharge due to her health, however she had to be removed from the jail by force as she did not want to be placed on leave under licence once more. When she was released she worked as an organiser for the WSPU in the south of England. The licence expired on 10 September 1913, but Scott was not found until May 1914, again resisting arrest.

Scott continued to work as an organiser for the Women's Social and Political Union in the Brighton branch under the name, 'Catherine Reid'. Scotland Yard and the Brighton Police both had to help the police that had come from Scotland to arrest Scott and return her to prison there, as she refused to walk and had to be lifted and dragged onto trains.

She started her hunger and thirst strike on 2 May when she was arrested, and by 8 May was ill and allowed to leave the Calton Gaol under licence. On 17 May Scott departed for London so that she could help the WSPU campaign against the liberal candidate in the Ipswich by-election. She was due to return to jail on 22 May. She was found on 19 June during a raid at a suffragette house, where she was rearrested and forced to return to jail, this time in Perth Prison, where she was force-fed.

Scott was given a Hunger Strike Medal 'for Valour' by WSPU.

== Force-feeding at Perth prison ==
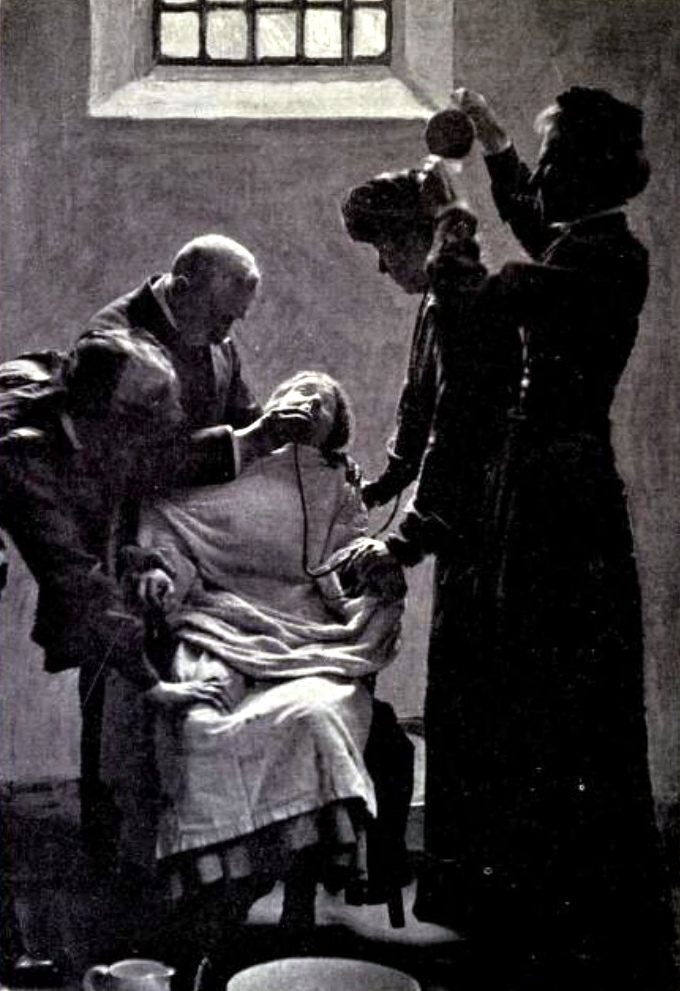
Force feeding (suffragettes)

Scott was taken to Perth Prison on 20 June and released on 26 July 1914. Perth Prison was a jail where suffragette prisoners were sent to be force-fed. She knew this as she had sent a bunch of sweet peas to Ethel Moorhead in March that year, when she had been suffering from this treatment and was eventually being released in health grounds. Despite an appeal to prison authorities by Janie Allan on Scott's own behalf, warning of dangerous protests during a royal visit if Scott was force-fed, she suffered force feeding throughout her imprisonment three times a day for a period of five weeks.

She was not allowed visitors or letters during her imprisonment, and her mother was not informed of her whereabouts. Scott was also denied access to a lawyer or permission to write to the Secretary of State for Scotland, nor given access to a copy of the prison rules. All this was to prevent 'unnecessary excitement' that may have hampered her 'treatment'.

Her autobiography, My Murky Past, was compiled and edited by her niece, Frances Wheelhouse, from taped interviews, and has the details which Scott used to describe a force-feeding tube being driven into her stomach as bits of her broken teeth washed around with blood in her mouth. When she vomited after it was removed, Watson would shout at her "You did that on purpose". Scott also recalled that one day Watson had said to her, "Look here, it's a pity, why don't you give it all away? The government would send you over to Canada and I would personally conduct you there." She replied, "That would be tantamount to saying that all this protest of mine was in vain and wrong and I would be giving in."

Scott was once more released under licence under the Cat and Mouse Act. Her sister Muriel had manned a stall by the river during Arabella's imprisonment, giving out suffrage materials and alerting people to the suffering her sister was undergoing, and regularly gathered a crowd of 3,000 people outside the prison to support her protest by singing and shouting to her to encourage her. Public buildings and films shows were cancelled, and an extra fifty police sent to the city. One Sunday, women interrupted the service at St. Ninian's Church saying that whilst they prayed her sister was being tortured. Upon her release to recover at Charlotte Street, near North Inch, Perth, the Dundee Courier reported that she was in 'good bodily health' which they reported as an unfortunate outcome from the Suffragettes point of view as an ending to this 'performance'.

Scott was released on 26 June 1914, two days before Archduke Franz Ferdinand was assassinated and the First World War began, with the UK joining by declaring war on Germany on 4 August. The WSPU announced a truce on militant acts, the Secretary of Scotland announced on 10 August the mitigation of all suffragette sentences passed in Scottish courts including Scott's.

== Later life ==
Arabella Scott went on to serve as a field hospital nurse during the war. She later married and as Arabella Colville-Reeves, emigrated to Sydney, Australia. She became a member of the Australian branch of the Suffragette Fellowship and was proud of her past, encouraging girls she taught to stand up for their rights.

She died on 27 August 1980.

== Dramatic representation ==
A fictional account based on Arabella Scott's ordeal has since been dramatised by Ajay Close. The writer had researched the novel A Petrol-scented Spring, following her play Cat and Mouse created during a writer-in-residence in Perth. The details were based on Watson's reports held in the National Archives of Scotland and from the select transcripts of taped interviews with Arabella Scott, provided by Frances Wheelhouse. The play explores the chemistry and relationship between the suffragette and the doctor who force-fed her.

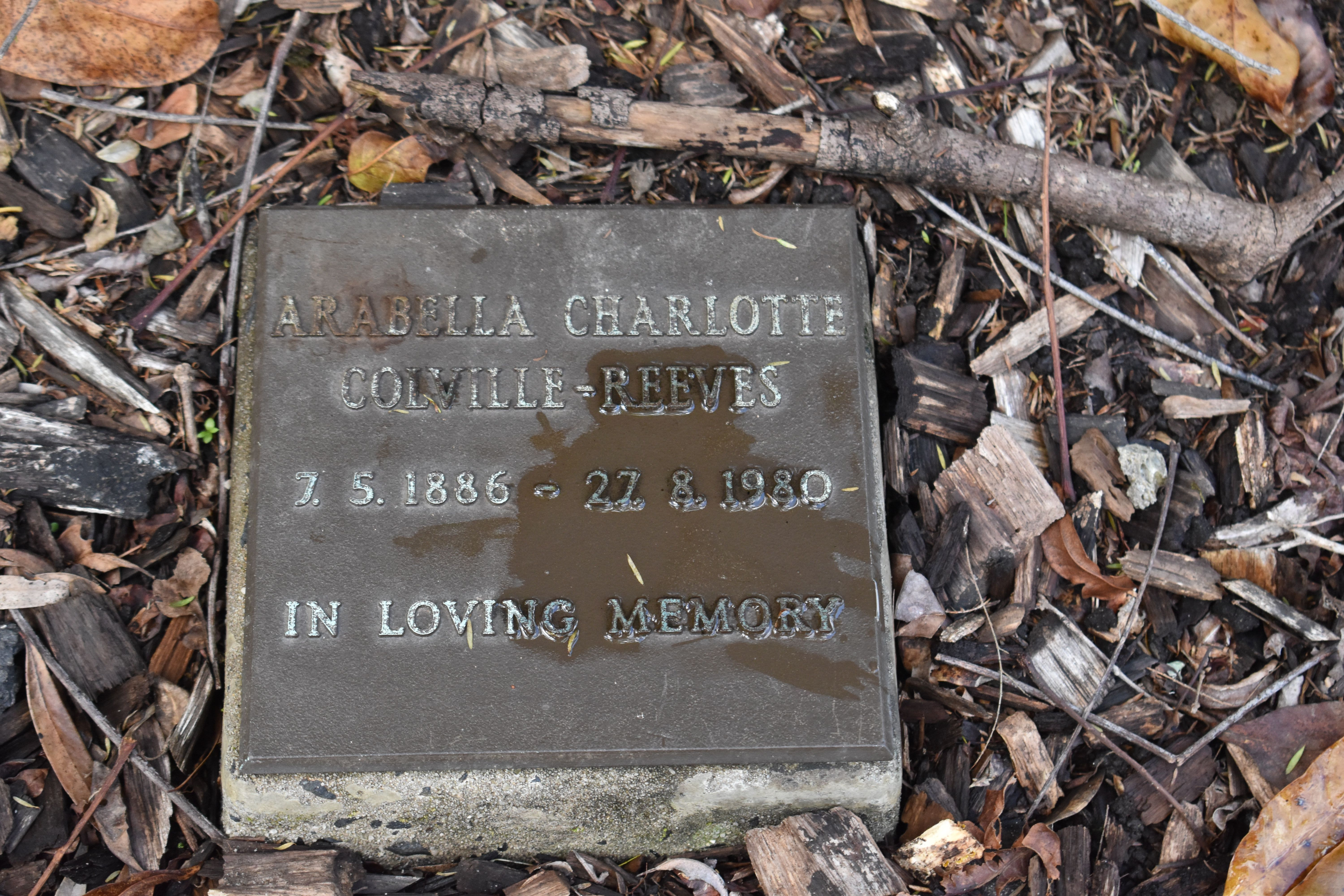
Arabella Scott's grave marker

== See also ==
- Women's suffrage in the United Kingdom
- Hunger Strike Medal
- Muriel Scott
- Frances Gordon
- Fanny Parker
- Maude Edwards
