= Hugh Ferguson Watson =

Scottish physician

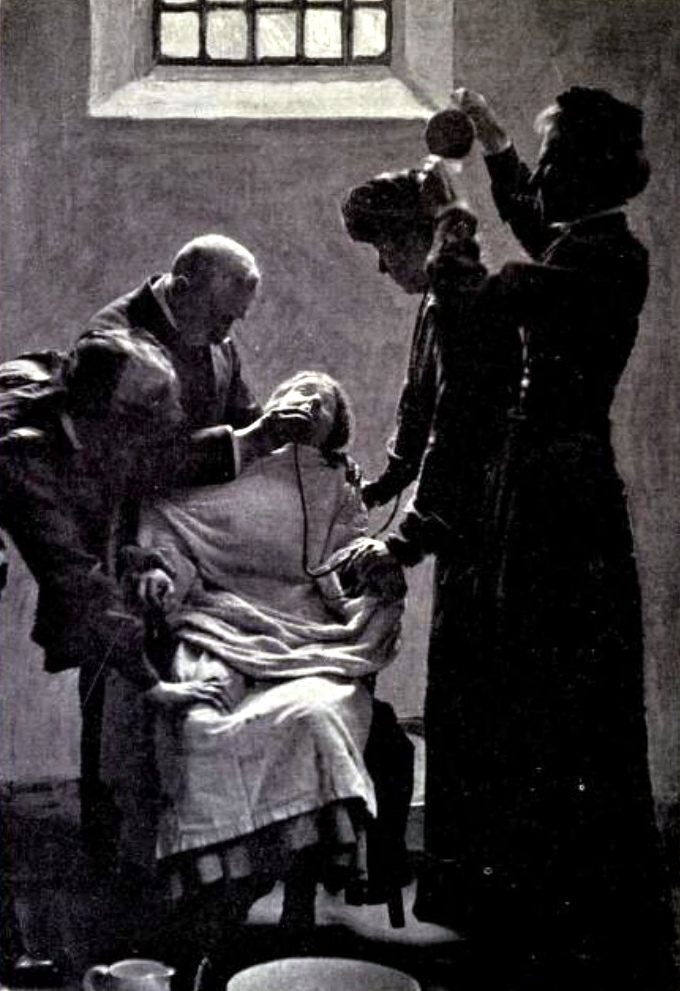
A depiction of Watson force-feeding Arabella Scott in Perth prison

Dr Hugh Ferguson Watson FRSE FRFPS MRCP DPH (1874–1946) was a 19th/20th-century Scottish physician who came to notoriety during the suffragette struggles of the early 20th century, particularly with reference to the Cat and Mouse Act in his capacity as medical officer to the Scottish Prison Service.

== Life ==
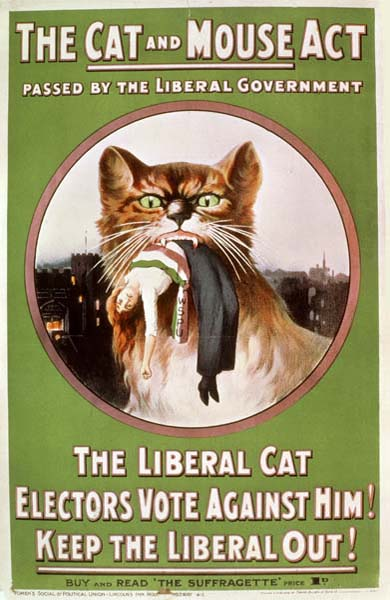
A contemporary poster

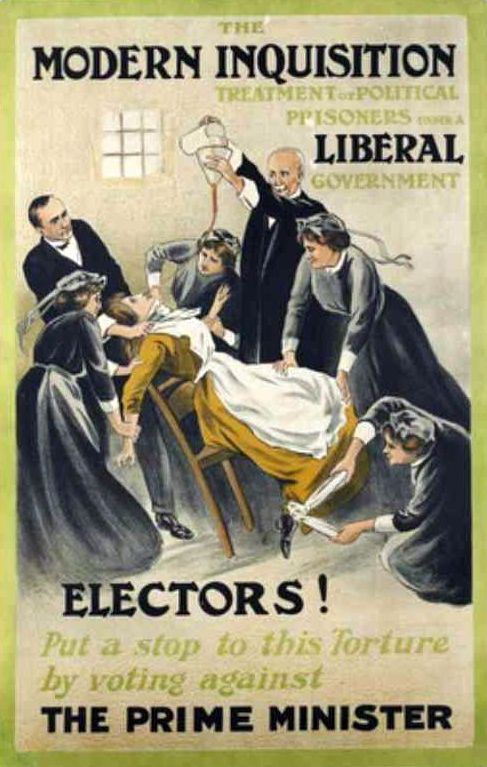
A poster depicting the events at Perth Prison

He was born on 26 March 1874 at Markethill Farm near Lochwinnoch in Renfrewshire, south-west of Glasgow. His father was William Drummond Watson (1846–1921) a tenant farmer, and his mother was Annie Neill (1852–1927). In 1881 his family had moved to Ochiltree. He was educated at Ayr Academy and was school dux.

He studied medicine at Glasgow University graduating MB ChB in 1911 and gaining his doctorate (MD) in 1913. He then took the unusual role as medical officer of Peterhead Prison from 1913. In this capacity, he volunteered in February 1914 to force-feed Ethel Moorhead on hunger strike at Calton Jail in Edinburgh. Ethel was later released into the care of Dr Grace Cadell, a rare (and sympathetic) female physician who had a sanctuary for suffragettes on Leith Walk.

Later in 1914 he was the official physician at the force-feeding of four female prisoners held at Perth Prison and subject to the new Cat and Mouse Act aimed to stem the suffragettes going on hunger strike. In this capacity he crossed swords with Arabella Scott, breaking her front teeth in the act of forcing the metal feed tube into her mouth.

Other suffragettes treated were Mary Richardson, Frances Gordon, Maude Edwards and Fanny Parker. The method was changed from force-feeding to nutrient-rich suppositories, but if anything, this increased public outrage.

Watson stayed on at Perth Prison until 1920, when he was appointed medical deputy commissioner to the General Board of Control for Scotland.

In 1923 he was elected a Fellow of the Royal Society of Edinburgh. His proposers were Andrew Freeland Fergus, Sir Robert Muir, Frederick Orpen Bower, and Thomas Hastie Bryce.

He died at the City hospital in Edinburgh on 16 June 1946, but was buried with family members in Mauchline Cemetery in Ayrshire.

== Family ==
In December 1916 he married Donella Anne Aitkens of Earls Court at St Cuthberts Church at Philbeach Gardens in London.
