= Elizabeth Finlayson Gauld =

Scottish suffragist (1863–1941)

- Born: c. 1863
- Died: 1941; Edinburgh, Scotland
- Known for: Suffragist

Elizabeth Finlayson Gauld (c. 1863 – 1941) was a Scottish suffrage campaigner in Edinburgh devoted to working for women's franchise for many years, convening meetings, taking part in the Women's March from Edinburgh to London, working with some of the most prominent suffrage campaigners and activists for women's rights. She was also prominent in the campaign for Scottish self-determination and in amateur theatre productions.

Gauld was born Elizabeth Russell circa 1863, married John Finlayson Gauld in 1901 and died aged 78 in 1941.

According to her husband's obituary, Gauld played a ‘prominent role in the women's suffrage movement.

Gauld's name first appears in the press when she is an "elocutionist" at a Temperance Gospel event in Grassmarket Edinburgh in 1905. Although this is not in itself proof of her temperance activism, on at least one occasion, in 1912, her commitment to the movement can be proved; "Mrs Finlayson’s fine speech at Haddington, in which she kept to the moral and temperance aspects of the question, made a deep impression".

== Suffrage involvement ==
Gauld's involvement with the suffrage movement began in a very small way in 1909, when she is recorded as donating half a crown (12½ new pence) to Women's Social and Political Union (WSPU) funds in Edinburgh.

By 1910, Gauld was far more active as a leader, speaking on numerous occasions in the Edinburgh area – for example, in August at a "Hot scone tea", she spoke about the London Suffrage procession. A specially invited audience of teachers visiting Edinburgh in the same month were invited to an "At home" with Gauld in the WSPU HQ at Melville Place Edinburgh.

Already, in July, she had made her debut chairing an open-air suffrage event. In November, she is noted as being involved in directing the preparation of special umbrellas to be carried through Edinburgh. This activity (for example, painting the slogan "votes for women" in colour on black umbrellas before volunteers paraded in public with the finished articles) was lauded by amongst others Dr. Anna Shaw, President of the National Suffrage Association in the United States of America.

The year concluded with Gauld protesting outside Edinburgh King's Theatre during a visit there by Lloyd George.

A major event in 1911, which Gauld was involved in leading, was the demonstration regarding the Conciliation Bill when, along with Anna Munro and Alexia B Jack, she spoke from a lorry in Princes Street. The newspaper report noted that the lorry was adorned in Women's Freedom League colours.

In 1912, at the age of 59, Gauld stood trial for smashing windows in Kensington High Street, London. She was reported as a matron of a children's orphanage and did not receive a custodial sentence because of her responsibilities.

In the following year, Gauld's name came to prominence in connection firstly with speaking at a large public meeting along with Muriel Scott; both defending 'Edith Johnson' (alias of Ethel Moorhead) who had damaged the display of Scottish hero William Wallace's sword, in a protest aimed to show that liberty was 'won by fighting'. Secondly she was involved with the Women's March from Edinburgh to London organised by Florence Gertrude de Fonblanque; Gauld is mentioned in Haddington and Dunbar and was a key speaker in Trafalgar Square along with Mrs Despard, Anna Munro and other principals.

Many years later (in 1939), Gauld dramatized the events as part of an Edinburgh Women's Citizens' Association "coming of age" stage presentation at the city's Little Theatre.

A "moving appeal" was how "Votes for Women" described Gauld's support for suffragettes in jail, after she addressed a crowded meeting in 1912 where released suffragette Agnes MacDonald described her prison experiences. The same report noted that Gauld had been given the responsibility for organising a paper-selling pitch in Princes Street, supported by Miss A Scott, Miss Kemp, Miss Melrose, Mrs Currall, Mrs Dallas, Mrs Charlton, Mrs Turner, Miss Ferrier and Miss Downie.

Gauld was one of the principal speakers against forcible feeding at a large meeting and subsequent demonstration in 1914. The event started with Nancy A John and Muriel Scott acting as Gauld's fellow speakers in Charlotte Square – a parade headed by piper Bessie Watson then led the protesters to the house of Dr Cadell where Ethel Moorhead, who had recently suffered forcible feeding in Calton Jail, was in "a critical condition".

== Later political activism ==
With the suspension of most suffrage events after the outbreak of World War One, Gauld turned her attention to war-related speaking and events. For instance, she spoke in 1915 at an open air meeting about the example of Florence Nightingale and the current lessons of her life.

More martially, in the same year, she stated that "Germany must be crushed" during a meeting of the Rosebery Royal Scots Recruiting Committee.

After a lecture by a Belgian refugee which was attended by a number of distinguished people including the Lord Provost, Sir Robert Kirk Inches, at the invitation of Sir Richard Mackie and his wife, Gauld and her husband "capably" performed a war playlet.

After the war, Gauld became involved in the movement for self-determination for Scotland; for example, being a speaker in Edinburgh's Society of Arts Hall in May 1919, and in 1922 she was one of those associated with the William Wallace Anniversary events of that year, the Orkney Herald quotes her as saying that "‘Wallace stood for sentiment because freedom was a sentiment that demanded the right of the people to make…and uphold their own laws".

She also spoke out against women being excluded from the legal profession and is quoted as saying that "justice delayed is justice denied."

Gauld's continuing commitment to Equal Franchise was demonstrated in 1926 when Gauld chaired the afternoon session of an autumn school organised by the Edinburgh National Society for Equal Citizenship, when the main speaker was Secretary of the National Union of Societies for Equal Citizenship, Lady Balfour of Burleigh, the wife of George Bruce, 7th Lord Balfour. This was the last time that her name appears in the press in connection with suffrage or other issues of the day.

== Theatrical involvement ==
Gauld and her husband were involved in amateur theatrical productions for many years, and she was both an actor and stage manager; the couple worked together as musical and dramatic arrangers, and Gauld was also a playwright. Together, the Gaulds took part in events such as a Grand Celebration of St Andrew's Night in Musselburgh in 1910.

Two years later, The Vote lists the couple as contributing songs and dramatic performances at one of WSPU ‘s meetings in Edinburgh and also noted that all the entertainment had been organised by Gauld herself.

1915 saw both Gaulds taking part in Women's Patriotic Service League fundraising events in aid of the Rosebery Royal Scots War Emergency Fund. The first of these, in May, took place in the Empire Theatre (now the Festival Theatre) Edinburgh, where the Gaulds’ play in three acts Elders’ bairns received its premiere; it was described as "spiced with gems of humour and Scottish philosophy". Both Gaulds also took parts in the play.

The second event took place at a garden party in Linlithgow: in "a very enjoyable fashion", Gauld's husband performed in a humorous sketch entitled A slight mistake. Gauld herself delivered a "Scotch" recitation called Hogmanay"with what the newspaper report called "very considerable dramatic power".

Gauld also oversaw a "much enjoyed and warmly received" pageant representing celebrated women which took place at Donaldson's Hospital in October 1915.

In 1916, a play solely written by Gauld was performed for the benefit of wounded Royal Scots’ soldiers: this was a comedy A brass farthing with a large cast, performed at the Lyceum Theatre Edinburgh, which was met with "enthusiastic applause".

Gauld's involvement in the theatre continued into the 1920s; highlights included a dramatization of Walter Scott’s Weir of Hermiston in collaboration with a local councillor. The Scotsman gave it an extensive and positive review. At a second performance, two weeks’ later, The Scotsman again reviewed the play, which on this occasion was being performed to raise funds during "Warriors’ Day", when Gauld's husband played the character of "The hanging Judge" and was praised for his performance.

Gauld was in occasional contact with fellow former suffrage campaigner Nannie Brown; for example, in producing Brown's play The Matrimonial Tea Party in 1925.

To commemorate the 600th anniversary of Robert the Bruce granting a Charter to Edinburgh (in 1329), a masque in thirteen parts was produced. Gauld was the Producer of Group XIII and also listed as one of the script-writers. The event was organised by the Outlook Tower Association which had been founded to promote the civic society vision of Sir Patrick Geddes.

Also in 1929, Nannie Brown co-ordinated a number of women wearing traditional Scottish plaids and shawls at a Scottish Rural Institutes event, and a "historical episode" of Gauld's St Margaret of Scotland was presented at the same event; this is the last time her name can be found in a public source.
