= Ada J. Graves =

British children's writer

Ada J. (Jane) Mumford (née Graves; 14 April 1870 – 8 July 1918) was a British children's writer. She was born in Benares, Bengal, the daughter of James Speed Graves and Charlotte Graves. In 1881 her family was living in Midlothian, Scotland.

Graves published three novels:

- The House by the Railway (possibly published in 1896, serialised in 1904 and then published as a book in 1906) illustrated by Rosa C. Petherick.
- Four Little People and their Year at Silverhaven (1898) illustrated by Florence Meyerheim.
- The Little Brown House (1902).

== The Railway Children Controversy ==
In 2011, it was claimed that significant sections of E Nesbit's novel The Railway Children may have been plagiarised from Graves' The House by the Railway, which was serialised in 1904, the year before Nesbit's work first appeared. Both works are said to bear "uncanny parallels" in plot. In both stories, children avert a train disaster by waving red flags made from pieces of their clothing to attract the driver's attention. The young heroes in both books are presented with engraved watches. Both stories also end with a family being reunited.

== Personal life ==
Graves, who was distantly related to the war poet Robert Graves, married Dr. Edward Rainsford Mumford (1876–1953), in Newfoundland Cathedral on 23 October 1905. Her husband later became a missionary in India.

== Death ==
Ada Mumford was the only European to be killed in the Srimangal earthquake of 8 July 1918. An account published in 1920, based on an interview with her husband, stated that she was killed instantly when her bungalow collapsed. According to her granddaughter in 2011, Graves had run back into her home in Kalighat to look for her daughter, not realising that the girl had already been taken to safety by a nanny.

Her sister, the suffragette Frances Gordon, survived the earthquake. Her niece was the poet Ida Affleck Graves.
