= Helen Boyle =

Irish-British physician and psychologist

Dr Helen Boyle
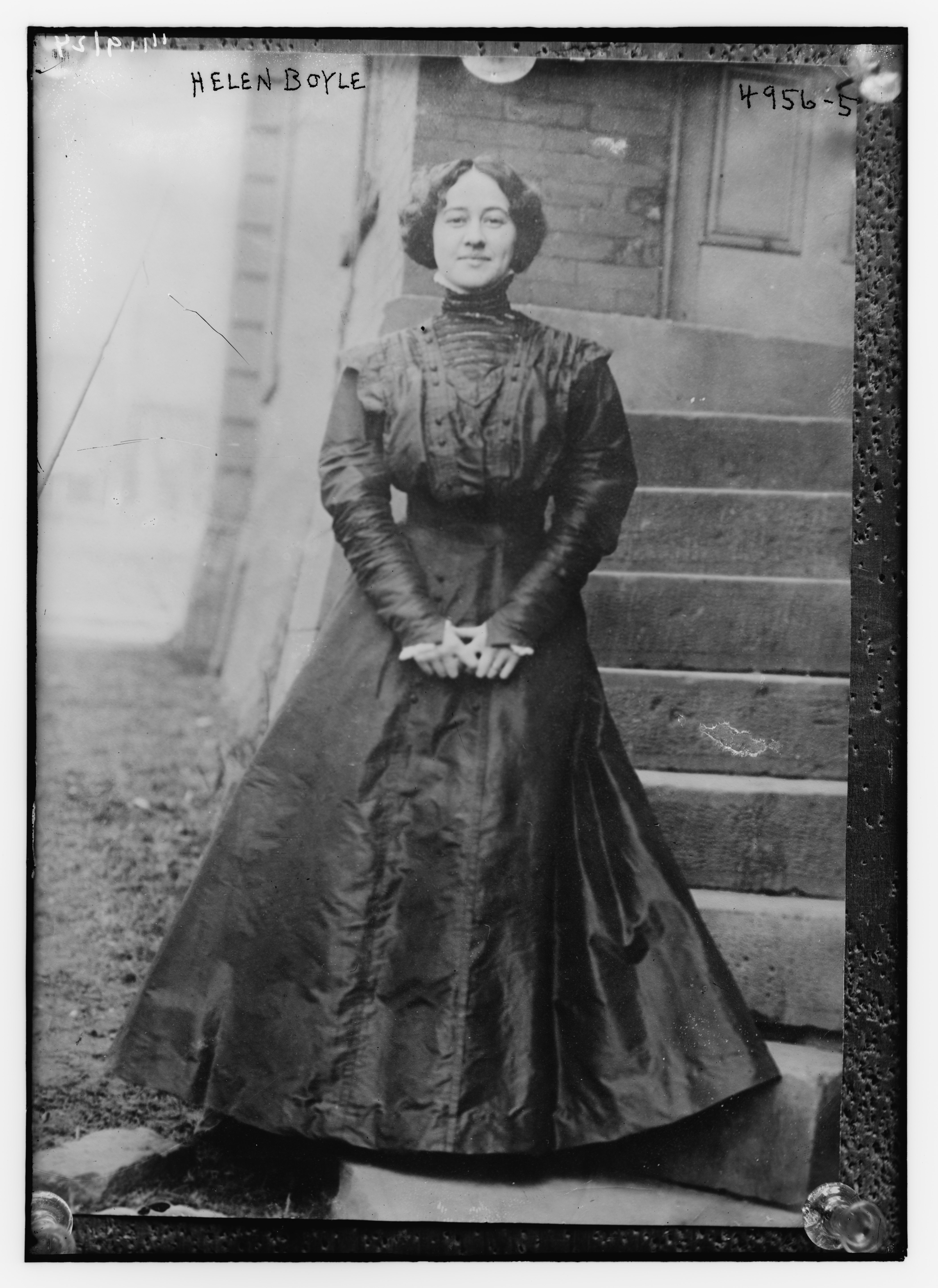
- Dr Helen Boyle in 1915
- Born: Alice Helen Anne Boyle; 19 November 1869; Dublin, Ireland
- Died: 20 November 1957 (aged 88); Pyecombe, West Sussex, England
- Education: London School of Medicine for Women
- Occupations: psychiatrist general practitioner
- Known for: First woman president of the Royal College of Psychiatrists
- Honours: Order of St. Sava; Queen Elisabeth Medal

Alice Helen Anne Boyle (19 November 1869 – 20 November 1957) was an Irish-British physician and psychiatrist. She was Brighton's first female general practitioner, and the first female president of the Royal Medico-Psychological Association (now the Royal College of Psychiatrists). Boyle had a passion for helping women with mental illness in poverty and used this to begin an era of proper treatment for mental disorders.

== Early life and education ==
Helen Boyle was born in Dublin, Ireland, in 1869, and studied in France and Germany, before moving to England in 1887. She studied at the London School of Medicine for Women from 1890 to 1893, under Elizabeth Garrett Anderson. In 1893, she qualified through the Scottish triple examination which allowed Scottish medical schools to equalise with other schools globally.

Boyle became licensed in the Royal College of Physicians of Edinburgh and the Royal Faculty of Physicians and Surgeons of Glasgow and completed a Doctor of Medicine (MD) degree in Brussels in 1894.

== Career ==
From 1894 to 1897, Boyle worked as an assistant medical officer at Claybury Hospital, where she focused on neurological disorders, as well as the Canning Town Mission Hospital. During her time in the East End of London, she was shocked by the way patients had to deal with emotional stress. While there, she became the first psychiatrist to identify bacillary dysentery among mental health patients in the facility. Boyle later became the medical superintendent at Canning Town Mission Hospital in the East End of London. As a result of the first hand experience she gained in working with mentally ill women in poverty, she was inspired to start her own facility.

In 1897, she moved to Hove, East Sussex, where she and Mabel Jones set up the Lewes Road Dispensary for Women and Children, a GP surgery in Roundhill Crescent. In doing so, Boyle became the first female general practitioner in Brighton and Hove. Jones mostly looked over Lewes Road Dispensary which allowed Boyle to move to Brighton to start another hospital.

In 1905, Boyle convinced the Countess of Chichester to become the patron of a new hospital in Brighton, which was intended for the treatment of women who were in the early stages of mental breakdown—the first such hospital of its kind in the UK, in a time when the only "treatment" for mentally unwell women was being sent to an asylum. The Lady Chichester Hospital was first established in a small house at 101 Roundhill Crescent, offering free or low-cost care in a mostly female environment for up to ten patients. It soon relocated to a larger house at 70 Brunswick Place in Hove in 1911, with capacity to treat 38 patients, before finally finding a permanent home in 1920 with the purchase of Aldrington House on New Church Road in Brighton; the hospital would remain there beyond Boyle's retirement in 1948, when it was absorbed into the newly formed National Health Service. It was extended and renovated many times over the following decades, and the "Lady Chichester" name was eventually dropped in 1988. The building still hosts a mental health clinic, supporting people over 65 who are undergoing early signs of psychosis.

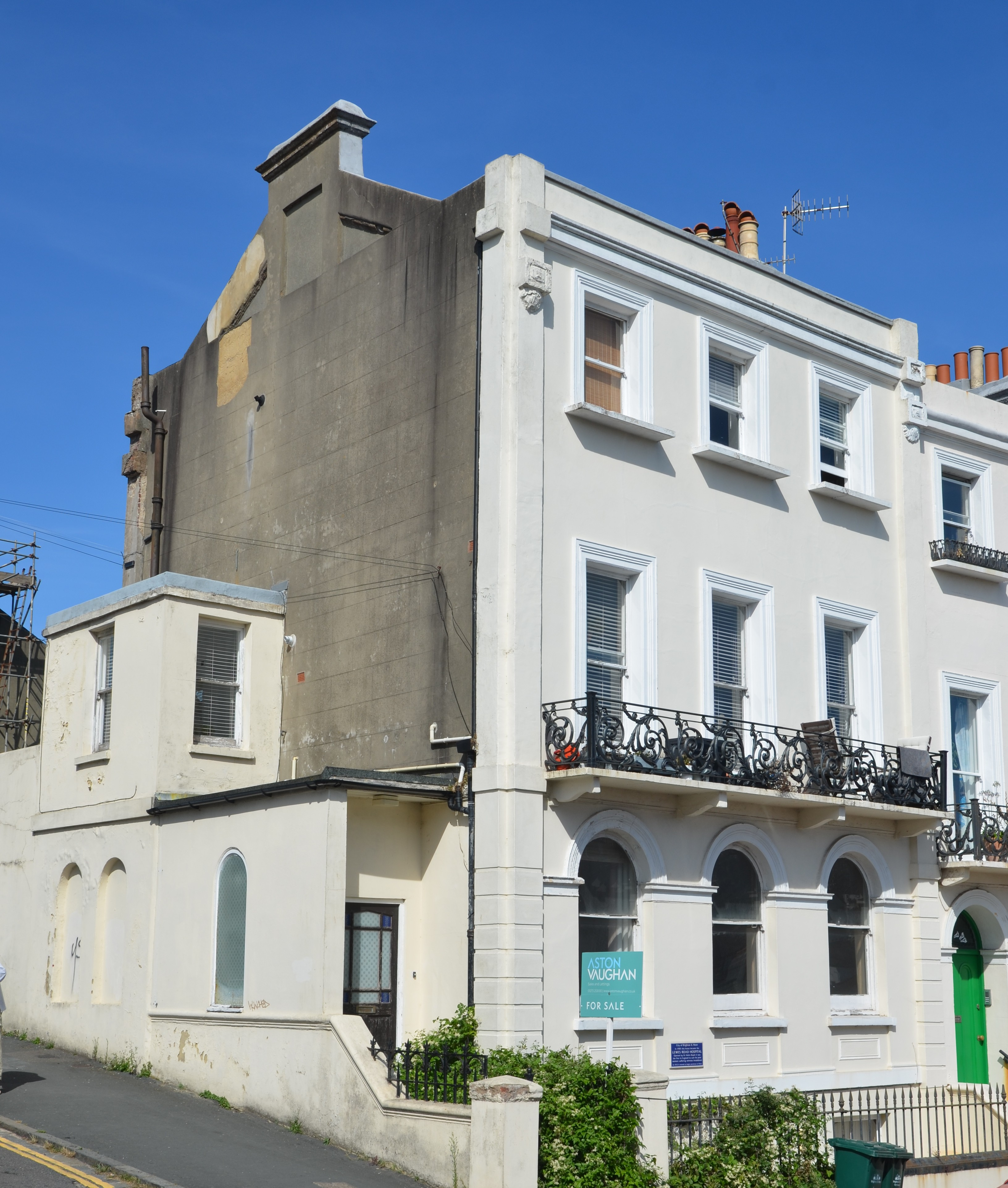
101 Round Hill Crescent, formerly the Lewes Road Dispensary for Women and Children, founded by Helen Boyle in 1897.

The Lady Chichester was the only hospital in Brighton to provide inpatient care at the time. Boyle treated the City financier and suffragette Gordon Holmes for appendicitis in 1919—the two women formed a close friendship, and Holmes was invited to sit on the Lady Chichester's board as a financial adviser. Boyle also treated the outsider artist Madge Gill in 1922, and she seems to have supported her in her ambitions to display her works.

Boyle worked at this facility for fifty years and remained an integral part of the practice through location changes and expansions. In 1910, she was the only woman to speak during a discussion organised by Farquhar Buzzard about anxiety, depression and cyclothymia. During the First World War, from 1914 to 1918, she worked in Serbia with the Royal Free Hospital Unit along with James Berry, and after the war, she was awarded the Queen Elisabeth Medal and the Order of St.Sava.

Boyle joined the Royal Medico-Psychological Association (now the Royal College of Psychiatrists) in 1898. After being an active and integral member of the association for years, Boyle became its first female president. She gave her Presidential Address 'Watchman, what of the night?' in Brighton on 12 July, 1939. In 1955 the association held their spring meeting in Brighton, to commemorate 50 years of The Lady Chichester Hospital. She was also involved in the creation of the Guardianship Society (1913), the Medical Women's Federation (1917), the International Medical Women's Federation (1922), The Child Guidance Council, and the National Association for Mental Health (now known as Mind).

== Personal life ==
Boyle never married or had children, but she lived with her long-time companion, Marguerite du Pre Gore Lindsay, for the final seventeen years of her life.

== Death and legacy ==
In 1929, Boyle moved to Pyecombe, West Sussex and she died there in November 1957, one day after her 88th birthday. She was a pioneer in mental health care for women.

In 2015, a blue plaque at Aldrington House was erected for her, and a Brighton & Hove bus has been named in her honour.

== Awards and honours ==
- Queen Elisabeth Medal
- Order of St.Sava
