= Mabel Jones =

British physician

- Born: c. 1865
- Died: 1923 (aged 57–58)
- Occupation: physician
- Known for: Suffragette and social reformer
- Honours: Queen Elisabeth Medal Belgium

Mabel Jones (c. 1865–1923) was a British physician and a sympathizer to the Women's Social and Political Union (WSPU).

== Medical career ==
Trained in London and from 1898, she worked in a practice with her fellow student, Dr Helen Boyle in Brighton after moving from Hull and then moved on to Glasgow in 1908. Although Dr Jones initially handled the routine cases in Hove, Brighton, the clinic was focused in treating women and it was mostly female led.

Jones was also noted for helping others who were sympathetic to the cause.

"Dr. Mabel Jones did very well in helping the boys to get over their little colds and fevers. ... illustrate how genuine a feminist Paschal had become between two ardent suffragists, his wife and mother, he too called on Dr. Mabel Jones' services"

== Queen Elisabeth Medal (Belgium) ==
It is reported that Jones either worked in Belgium or attended Belgian wounded in Scotland during World War I and was awarded the Queen Elisabeth Medal and this was sent on her sudden death to her medical colleague Dr Helen Boyle of Brighton

== Frances Gordon's case ==
Jones evaluated the health state of suffragette Frances Gordon after she was released from Perth prison. A part of the report she produced was quoted in a letter to the Glasgow Evening Times:

"I saw her (Miss Gordon) at Midnight in July 3. Her appearance was appalling, like a famine victim: the skin brown, her face bones standing out, her eyes half shut, her voice a whisper, her hands quite cold, her pulse a thread."

This quote and the Press exposure of pictures of women on stretchers after release from prisons led to questions in the House of Commons, giving voice to the female suffrage cause. In the book Martyrs in our Mydst, Leah Leneman openly questions the level of accuracy of Dr Jones report on Frances Gordon and also challenges the official version:

"Comparing the [prison] medical officer's daily reports with Frances Gordon's story as related by Mabel Jones, it is clear that the later did indeed contained a good deal of distortion, but a far greater distortion was the version of the events provided by the medical officer and Chairman of the Prison Commission to the Scottish Office"

== Supporting other suffragettes ==
It is uncertain if Jones went to London to meet the Pankhursts to protest that Janie Allan was removed from the West of Scotland branch of the WSPU. The Women's Library Archive has a printed leaflet of a visit by Dr Jones to Mrs Pankhurst in a cell at the Central Police Station. She did also co-examine the gynaecological damage done by the violent use of rectal feeding on Fanny Parker and reported in the WSPU newsletters about other cases.

== Death and legacy ==
Jones died in 1923 after falling from a train in Northampton, England.

== See also ==
- Women's suffrage in the United Kingdom
