= Annie Walker Craig =

British suffragette (1864–1948)

- Born: 1864; Gravesend, Kent, England
- Died: 1948 (aged 83–84)
- Occupations: Socialist, political activist, suffragette

Annie Walker Craig (1864–1948) was a British socialist, political activist and suffragette active in England and Scotland. She participated in many direct action campaigns and often gave a false name - notably Rhoda Robinson, Annie Walker Greig, and Annie Rhoda Walker - to the police to thwart further investigation or criminal charges. She was described in The Suffrage Annual, and Women's Who's Who of 1913 as "the first militant Suffragette in Scotland".

== Early life ==
Annie Rhoda Walker was born at Gravesend Kent, in 1864 to Henry and Anne Jane Walker. She had something of an itinerant childhood as her schoolmaster father moved around the country from one teaching post to another. In the 1871 census the family were living in Yorkshire. In 1881 Annie was a pupil teacher living with her family, now in Birmingham where they settled. Ten years later 27-year-old Annie was working as a bookkeeper and artist, living with her parents. In 1899 Annie married Frank McCulloch Craig, a Scottish widower with children, whose family ran a stevedoring business on the Clyde.

== Activism ==
The earliest evidence of her connection with the WSPU associations in 1906 where she is listed in the postal directory of the time as its secretary in Dunbartonshire, at a residential address in Round Riding Road, Dumbarton. In 1909, now a member of the Old Kilpatrick School Board, she became the WSPU organiser in Scotland.

In 1911, participating in a ‘broken windows’ demonstration, she was arrested in London and appeared at Bow Street Magistrates' Court. On another occasion she served ten days in Holloway Prison for smashing windows at the War Office.

Back home in Scotland, in 1912 she was identified in a newspaper report as a “well dressed woman” who smashed the windscreen of a car belonging to Glasgow councillor and businessman Sir Thomas Mason, (Note: Sir Thomas Mason (1844-1924) was a Glasgow businessman, partner in a construction firm specialising in public works. He was a Glasgow councillor from 1891, and chairman of the Cylde Navigation Trust. He was knighted in 1908.) with a rock she concealed in her muff, mistaking him for Winston Churchill. (Note: Winston Churchill, appointed First Lord of the Admiralty in October 1911, was in Glasgow to give a speech arguing for the expansion of the British fleet and against that of the German fleet.) She was arrested, gave her name as Annie Rhoda Walker or Greig and her address as the WSPU offices, and on conviction, served seven days imprisonment.

She is listed in 1913 as the first Independent Labour Party member in Dunbartonshire, and resident at Warwick Villas, Mill Road, Yoker.

In February 1914 she was involved in one of the most serious incidents in the Scottish campaign. Four women including Annie met at St Fillans railway station in Perthshire on 3 February. Later that night they set fire to three mansions in Upper Strathearn, Comrie. The women were spotted the next day attempting to embark trains. Annie made it to Glasgow and was arrested in Bath Street, another woman, Ethel Moorhead, was arrested in Edinburgh a week or so later. Craig gave her name as Rhoda Robinson before being transferred to prison in Perth, where police attempted to verify her identify. Whilst in prison she entered into a hunger strike, but was dissuaded from continuing it by suffragettes in Glasgow who advised her that the tactic tended to be restricted to those convicted and imprisoned, rather than held in remand. She was released on £800 bail on 12 February 1914. In May 1914, charges against Craig were dropped. Her co-accused, Ethel Moorhead, was less fortunate; she was held in Calton Jail in Edinburgh where she went on hunger strike and became the first woman in Scotland to be force fed.

Later in 1914 Craig appeared in Dumbarton charged with fire raising, but was again released due to a lack of identification evidence. She died in 1948.
