= Florence Meyerheim =

British artist

Florence Meyerheim (October 1873 – c. 1936) was a British illustrator of children's books. She was born in Barton upon Irwell, the second daughter of Moritz and Mira Meyerheim. She was baptised on 30 November 1873 at St Paul, Southport, Lancashire. Her father, who was born in Germany, was a merchant.

== Life and works ==
Meyerheim illustrated books by a group of contemporary authors who were associated with the Religious Tract Society, the Sunday School Union and publisher Andrew Melrose, one of the first being W.E. Cule's Three Little Wise Men and the Star (1896). She illustrated children's books by Mrs S.G Arnold, Gertrude Doughty, Blanche Atkinson, Grace Carlton, Charles M. Sheldon, Ada J. Graves, Mrs. Henry Clarke, Charlotte Nye, Elsie J. Oxenham, Edith L. Elias and others. A reviewer of The New Playfellow by Gertrude E. M. Vaughan (1901), commented "The illustrations this time are so charming that their author must be named, Florence Meyerheim." She also illustrated contemporary editions of Tom Brown's Schooldays and Oliver Twist.

In the 1911 Census, Florence Meyerheim, artist, was living at 44 Culmington Rd. Ealing, London, with her sister, Maude. In 1919, she, her sister and her brother Harold changed their surnames by deed poll to Maynham-Elmy. Between 1922 and 1936 she is shown in the London Electoral Registers as continuing to reside in Ealing.
