= Janie Allan =

Scottish suffrage activist (1868–1968)

- Born: Jane Allan; 28 March 1868; Glasgow, Scotland
- Died: 29 April 1968 (aged 100); Spean Bridge, Scotland
- Years active: 1902–1914
- Known for: Suffragette and women's rights activist

Jane "Janie" Allan (28 March 1868 – 29 April 1968) was a Scottish activist for and patron of the suffragette movement of the early 20th century.

== Early life and family ==
Janie Allan was born to Jane Smith and Alexander Allan, members of the wealthy Glaswegian family that owned the Allan Line shipping company. Her grandfather, Alexander Allan, founded the firm in 1819, and by the time that her father – the youngest of Alexander Allan's five sons – took over the running of the company's Glasgow operations, the line had many vessels, additional offices in Liverpool and Montreal, and had wrested the Royal Mail's North American contract away from the Cunard line. Janie's brother, Robert S. Allan, was later a partner of the Allan Line.

In common with many of her family, Allan held socialist political views and helped the city's poor. She was an early member of the Independent Labour Party (ILP), and she edited a column covering women's suffrage issues for the socialist newspaper Forward.

== Suffragette movement ==
In May 1902, Allan was instrumental in re-founding the Glasgow branch of the National Society for Women's Suffrage as the Glasgow and West of Scotland Association for Women's Suffrage (GWSAWS), and was a member of its executive committee. She was a significant financial supporter, and as one of the GWSAWS vice-presidents she took up a position on the National Union of Women's Suffrage Societies (NUWSS) committee in 1903, to represent the association following their affiliation.

In 1906, Allan was among the audience when Teresa Billington (who had been arrested and jailed following a protest in London earlier in the year) toured Scotland, although the GWSAWS themselves refused to invite Billington to speak. In December of that year she attended a lecture by Helen Fraser as she expounded the militant principles of the newly formed Women's Social and Political Union (WSPU). In 1907, concerned that the non-violent GWSAWS was not being as effective as it should have been, Allan resigned from their executive committee and joined the WSPU, although she maintained her subscription to GWSAWS until 1909.

Over the following few years, Allan provided at least £350 (approximately equivalent to £35,600 in 2025) in funds to the WSPU, as well as donating some funding for the Women's Freedom League (WFL) following their split from the WSPU. In addition to her monetary contributions, Allan was an active participant in the WSPU's militant activism.

=== Imprisonment and forced-feeding ===
In early March 1912, along with over 100 others Allan participated in a window smashing protest in central London. The women secreted large stones and hammers under their skirts and, once in position, in a coordinated action they destroyed shop windows in Regent Street, Oxford Street, and the vicinity. Following this, the women patiently and calmly waited for the police to arrive. While police attention was diverted elsewhere by the protests, Emmeline Pankhurst and three others managed to get close enough to 10 Downing Street to throw stones through four of its windows. In the aftermath, along with many of her associates Allan was arrested, tried, and sentenced to four months in Holloway Prison.

Her imprisonment was widely publicised, and around 10,500 people from Glasgow signed a petition to protest for her freedom. Her fellow suffragette, Margaret McPhun – who was herself imprisoned in Holloway for two months in 1912 after breaking a government office window – composed a poem entitled "To A Fellow Prisoner (Miss Janie Allan)", that was included in the anthology Holloway Jingles published by the Glasgow branch of the WSPU later that year.

While in prison Allan used her privileged position to improve the levels of comfort for her inmates, including distributing confectionery and fruit to fellow suffragettes. Two months into her sentence, she barricaded the door to her cell, and it reportedly took three men with tools around three quarters of an hour to break into the room. Following this action, Allan started a hunger strike, a form of protest that had been pioneered amongst the suffragette movement by Marion Dunlop in 1909. However, following Dunlop having thus successfully forced the authorities to release her on health grounds, the British government introduced a policy of forced-feeding of imprisoned suffragettes who refused food.

In accordance with this policy, Allan was force-fed for a full week. Forcible feeding was an ordeal described by Pankhurst as a "horrible outrage", and has been likened by women's history scholar June Purvis to a form of rape. In a later letter to a friend, Allan herself stated that "I did not resist at all ... yet the effect on my health was most disastrous. I am a very strong woman and absolutely sound in heart and lungs, but it was not till 5 months after, that I was able to take any exercise or begin to feel in my usual health again – the nerves of my heart were affected and I was fit for nothing in the way of exertion ... There can be no doubt that it simply ruins the health."

In February 1914, forcible feeding was implemented in Scotland during Ethel Moorhead's imprisonment for violently resisting arrest after being spotted behaving suspiciously in the vicinity of Traquair House. Allan was a key part of the campaign against this action, and as well as publicly protesting met with the Medical Prison Commissioner, Dr James Devon, to advocate against the use of a method that she regarded as likely to "injure permanently a woman's health." In June that year, Allan wrote to prison authorities that the burning of Whitekirk Parish Church near Edinburgh was due to the treatment of Moorhead and if other suffragettes in Perth, Arabella Scott and the woman known as 'Frances Gordon' were force fed, threatened the upcoming royal visit to Scotland could see 'disastrous' protests. And in July, Allan again intervened at the highest level, in support of Frances Parker following her imprisonment for attempted arson on Burns Cottage.

=== Taxation protests ===
Allan was taken to court again in 1913. In addition to direct suffragette action, she was involved with and supported the Women's Tax Resistance League, which argued that as women could not vote and therefore were not represented in parliament, they should not be subject to taxation. These beliefs led to her refusal to pay super tax on her income and investments for the financial year ending April 1912. At her trial on 1 March 1913, Allan defended herself and argued that as women were not considered 'persons' under the Franchise Act, they should not be considered 'persons' under the Finance Act either. The judge, Lord Cullen, found against her and stated that "it being clear on a construction of these [tax] statutes that women are not excluded from their scope."

=== The St. Andrew's Halls incident ===
By early 1914, Allan had become one of the principal organisers for the WSPU in western Scotland, based in Glasgow. On 9 March 1914, Emmeline Pankhurst, the WSPU national leader, was to address a public meeting at St Andrew's Halls in the city, and Allan was in attendance. Ethel Moorhead said Allan had a presence due to her height, beauty and quietness. The event took place when Pankhurst had recently been released from prison under the terms of the new, so-called 'Cat and Mouse Act', introduced by the government to counter the suffragette hunger strikes. In accordance with the Act, once Pankhurst was returned to full health, she was due to be rearrested and re-incarcerated.

Glasgow police decided to use the occasion of the public address to effect the arrest. However, the WSPU activists anticipated their action and increased security coverage for their leader, including enforcing strict secrecy surrounding her movements and erecting a concealed barbed wire barrier across the front of the stage. A short time into Pankhurst's speech, around 160 police officers stormed the hall and began to move toward the stage. They were met by a barrage of thrown chairs and plant pots, and soon fights broke out between the police and members of the audience. During the commotion, one of the women present drew a revolver and fired several blank cartridges toward the ceiling. The police attempted to apprehend her, but she managed to slip their grasp and escape. Despite not being positively identified at the time, many since have stated that Allan was the woman with the revolver. She tried in vain for six months afterwards to get a public enquiry into police behaviour.

== Later life ==
At the outbreak of World War I later in 1914, the WSPU suspended their suffragette activities and threw their weight behind a concerted national effort in the conflict. Allan donated a large sum of money to Dr Flora Murray and Dr Louisa Garrett Anderson that enabled the founding of the Women's Hospital Corps.

In 1923, she chaired the Women's Watch Committee, continuing to report on public authority attitudes to women, and she was involved in the Scottish Council for Women's Trades for 20 years.

Allan died in April 1968 at her home in Invergloy, near Spean Bridge in the Scottish Highlands, one month after her 100th birthday.
