= HM Prison Friarton =

Former prison in Perth and Kinross, Scotland

- Interactive map of HM Prison Friarton
- Location: Perth, Scotland; 56°22′25.4″N 3°25′17″W
- Status: Closed (original building demolished; merged into HM Prison Perth)
- Capacity: 89
- Opened: 1963
- Closed: 2010

HM Prison Friarton (later Friarton Detention Centre, Friarton Borstal and Friarton Hall Young Offenders Institution) was a place of detention for young (male) offenders aged between 16 and 21. It was located on the outskirts of Perth, Scotland, opposite the southern end of the city's Friarton Island. It occupied the former site of Friarton Fever Hospital, designed by Perth natives J. & G. Young. Upon its opening in 1963, it became one of two such establishments in Scotland, the other being South Inch House (what is now HM Prison Glenochil) in Clackmannanshire.

The facility was established after South Inch House reached its capacity. It changed from being a youth detention centre into being a Borstal four years later, after South Inch House expanded its capacity, before becoming a young offenders institute in April 1970.

In 1999, the Institution became part of HM Prison Perth, just over a mile to the north on the same Edinburgh Road, and its buildings demolished to make way for a housing estate. In 2010, the facility within HM Prison Perth it moved to was put on the market because it was "underused and had inadequate facilities".
