= Governor's House, Edinburgh =

1817 house in Edinburgh, Scotland

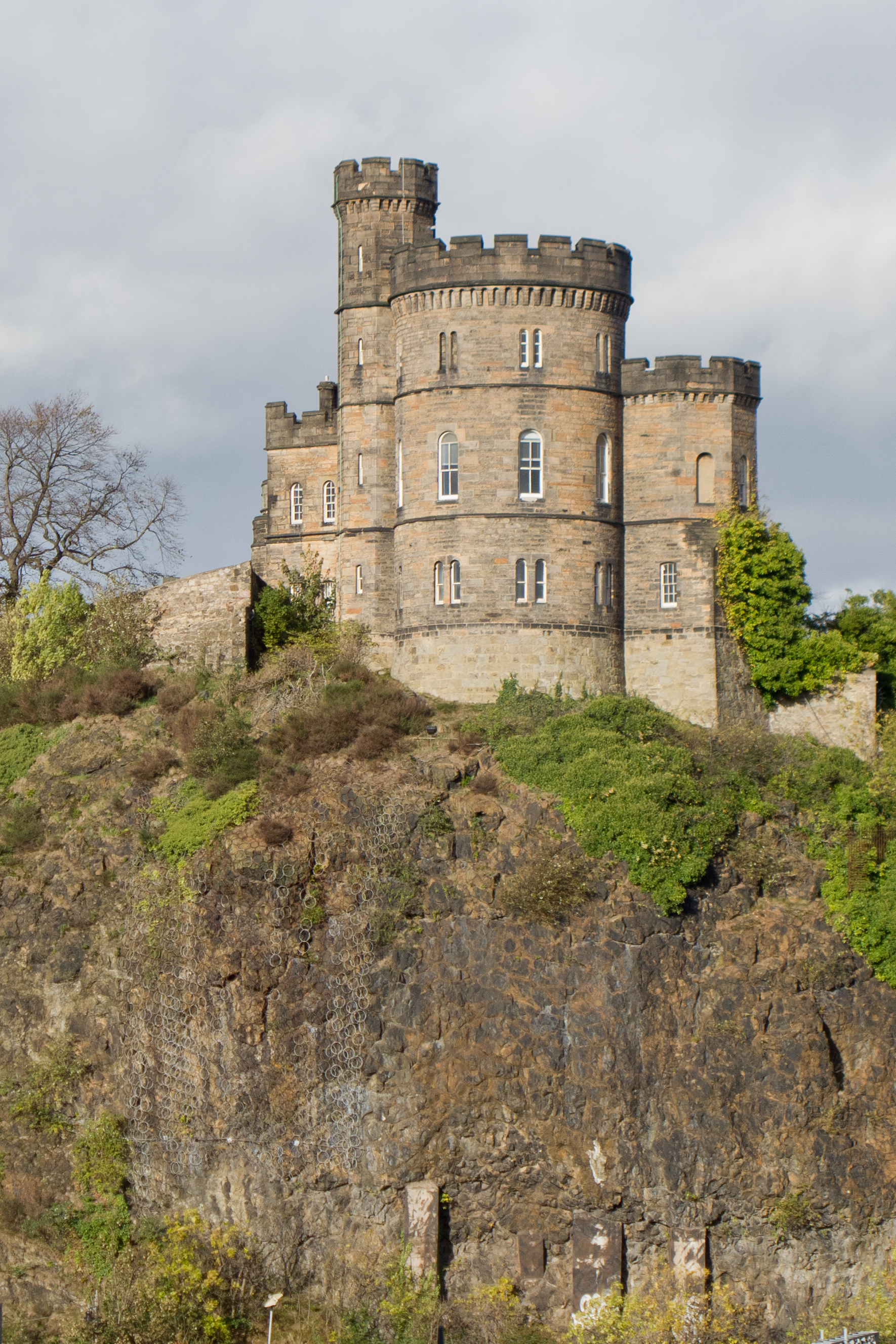
Governor's House

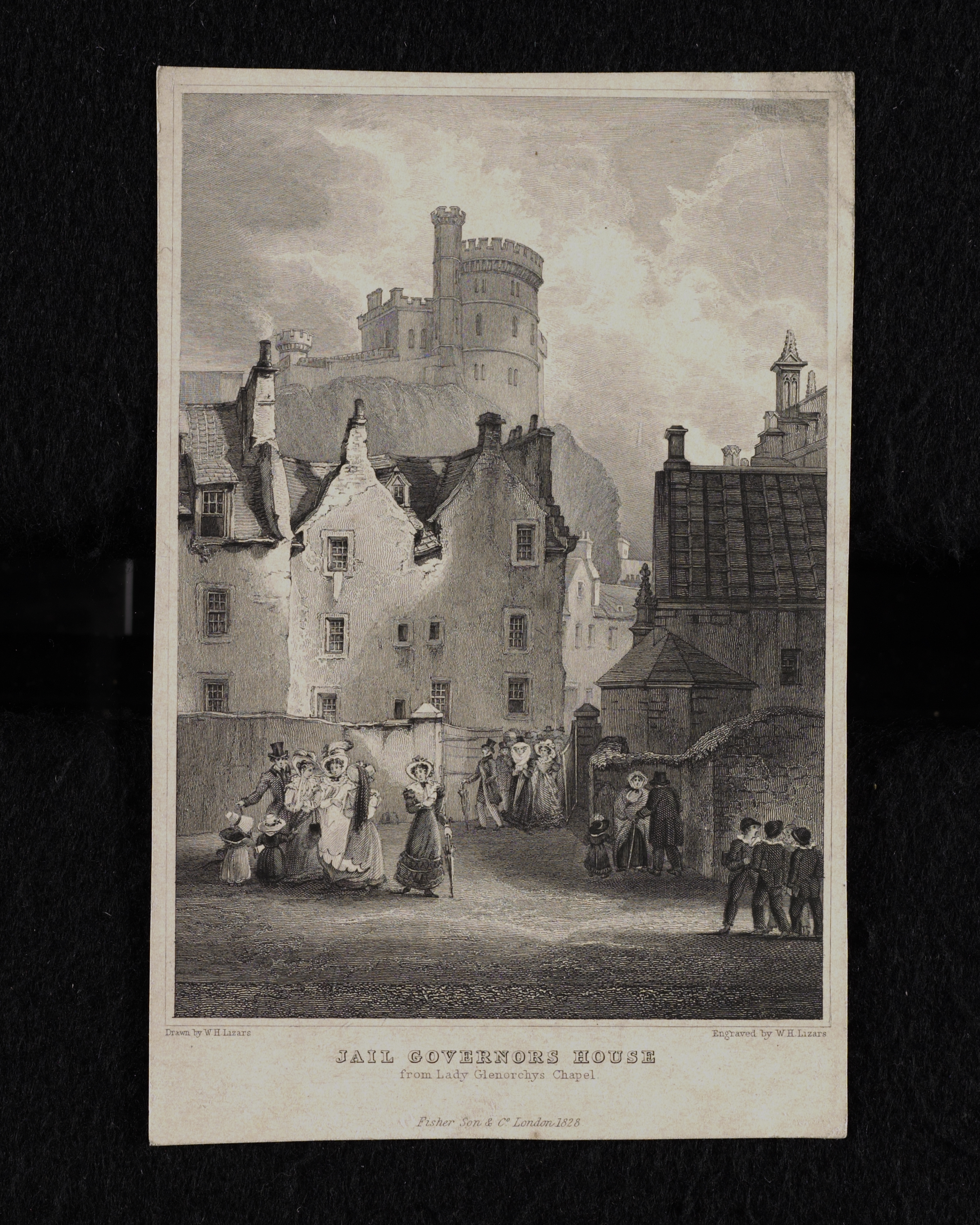
Historic view of Governor's House

Governor's House is a building situated on the southernmost spur of Calton Hill, beside the south-east corner of Old Calton Burial Ground, in Edinburgh, Scotland. It looks out over Waverley Station, the Canongate and Holyrood Park to the south.

The building of 1815–17 is all that remains of Calton Jail, once the largest prison in Scotland, completed in 1817. It was designed by Archibald Elliot (1761-1823) who was also responsible for the nearby Waterloo Place and Regent Arch. The House contained the Committee Room used by the Commissioners who governed the prison.

Its castellated and turreted form is similar to James Craig's Old Observatory House on Calton Hill, but its design was more likely influenced by Robert Adam's older 'Bridewell' of 1791, which stood alongside the newer prison. The jail closed in 1927 and, except for the Governor's House, was demolished in 1937 to make way for St Andrew's House.

Until recently, the building housed the Scottish Government's multimedia team and, for a time, was considered as a possible official residence for Scotland's First Minister, replacing the National Trust for Scotland-owned Bute House.

Governor's House is where the Scottish Fiscal Commission is based.

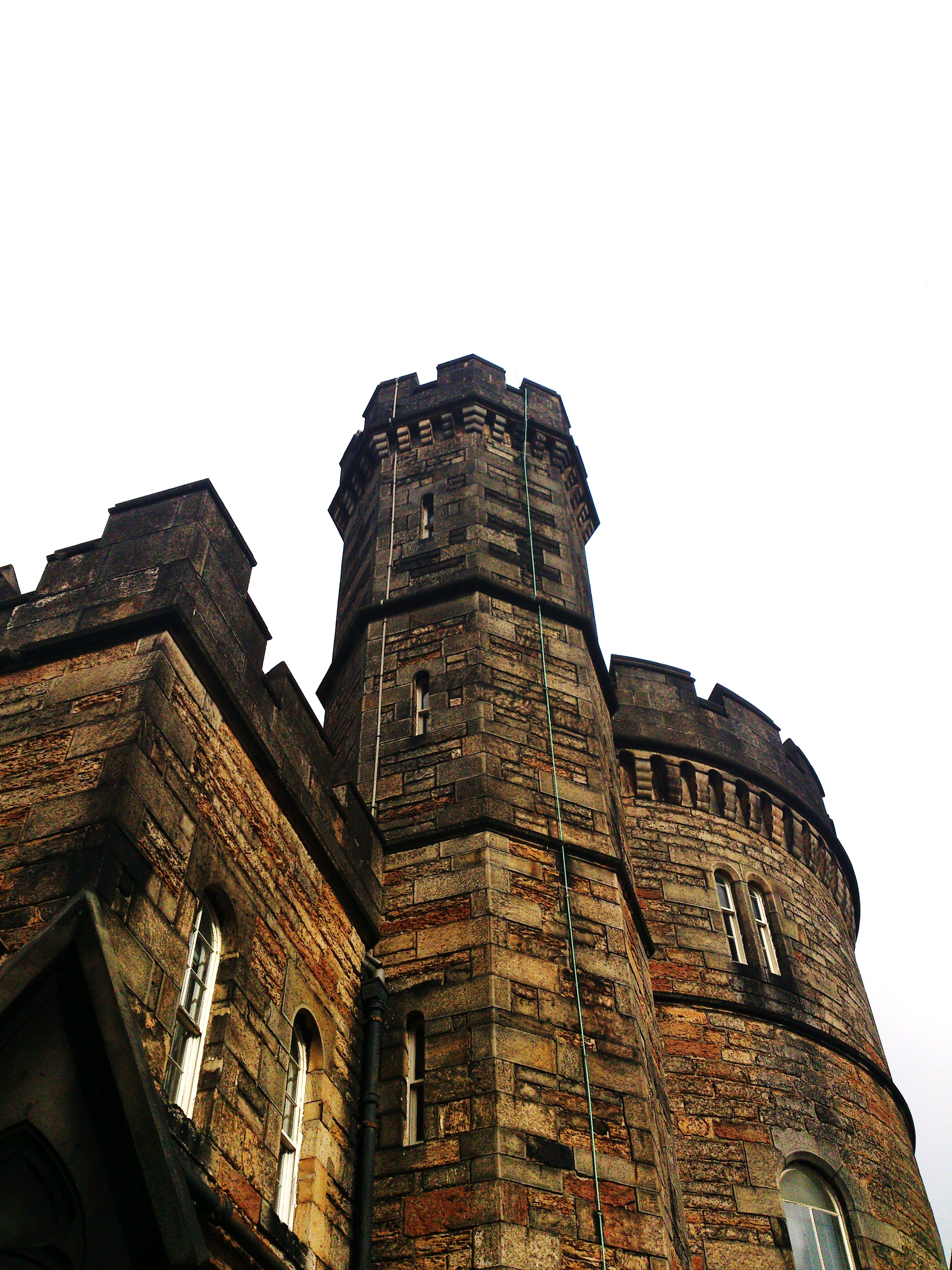
Governor's House view from Old Calton Cemetery
