= HM Prison Perth =

Prison in Perth and Kinross, Scotland

Coordinates: 56°23′8″N 3°25′48″W

HMP Perth
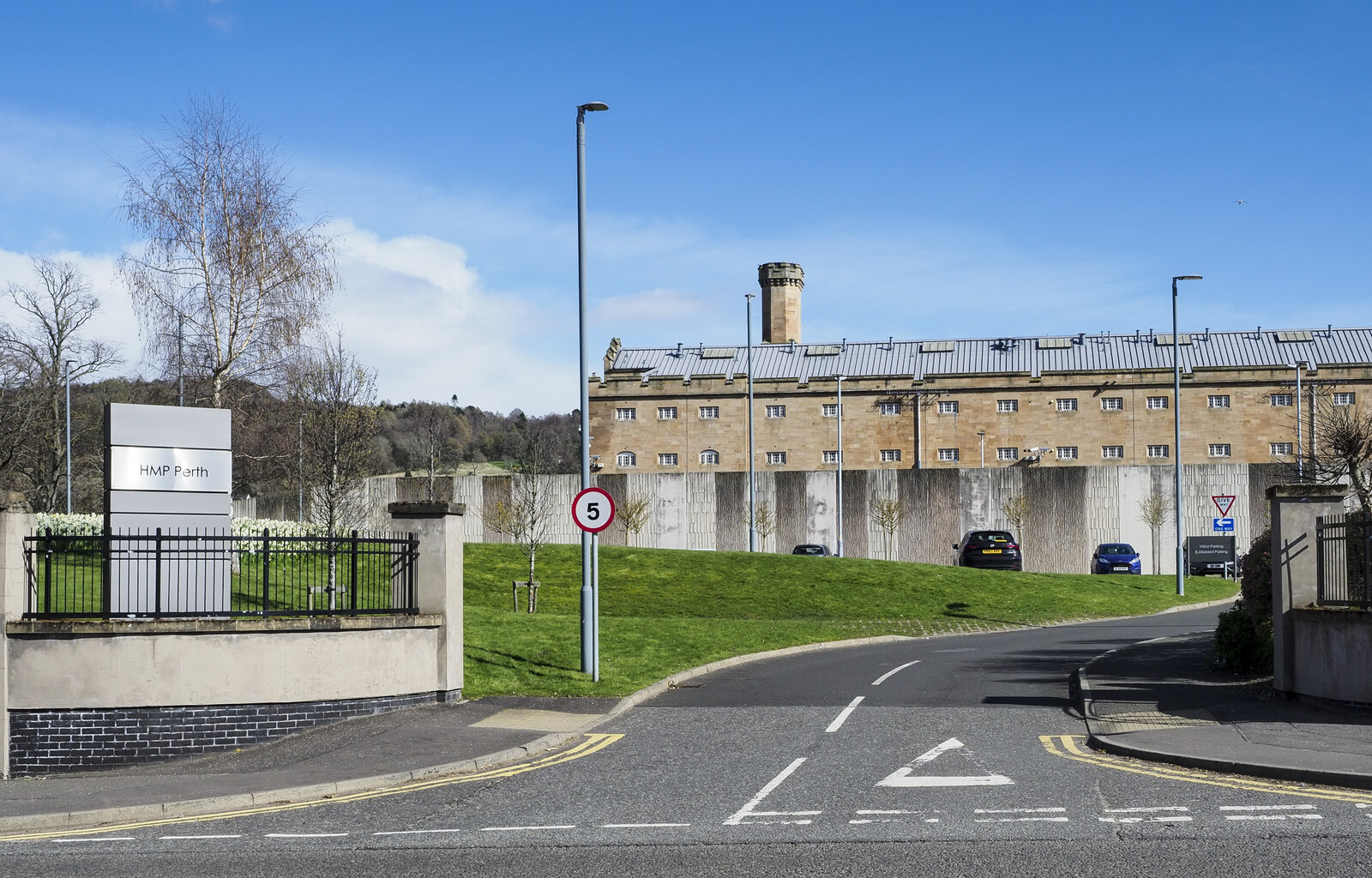
- Interactive map of HMP Perth
- Location: Perth, Perth and Kinross
- Status: Operational
- Security class: Category A
- Capacity: 670+
- Opened: 1840 (186 years ago)
- Managed by: Scottish Prison Service
- Governor: Brian McKirdy

HM Prison Perth is a prison in Perth, Scotland, which houses remand, short term, long term and life adult male prisoners (those prisoners serving under four years). It was originally constructed to hold French prisoners captured during the Napoleonic Wars, and is the oldest working prison in Scotland.

== Purpose and location ==
The prison is a maximum security establishment which also houses fine defaulters and those on remand from the courts of Angus, the Dundee City council area, Perth and Kinross and the northern part of Fife. There is a secure unit for Category A prisoners who are serving sentences of up to life imprisonment. It is Scotland's oldest prison still in use.

== Buildings and facilities ==
=== Main building ===
The main building, a half-mile (1 km) south of the city centre beyond the South Inch, was constructed by architect Robert Reid (1774–1856) from 1810-12 to hold French prisoners captured during the Napoleonic Wars, when it was known as the Depot. In 1842, the building began service as a civilian prison. It comprises three halls, labelled A to C, (originally five) and has a capacity of 630 prisoners.

=== Friarton Hall ===
A second building, Friarton Hall, which was, until 1999, a separate institution known as HM Prison Friarton, was situated opposite the southern end of Moncreiffe Island, 1 1/4 miles (2.0 km) south southeast of the town centre. This modern building once served to prepare prisoners for open conditions and had a capacity of 89. Friarton closed in early 2010 and was demolished to make way for a housing estate.

=== Current capacity ===
The prison no longer has a D or an E hall. The original C Hall was replaced in 2006 by a newer Hall holding 365 prisoners. The prison now holds approaching 700 prisoners, including a large number serving for more than four years.

=== Hanging block ===
In 1965, the United Kingdom's last condemned suite to be built was constructed at the prison. The building was separate from the rest of the prison and was known as the 'Hanging Block'. It was never used as the death penalty was suspended later that year and abolished for murder in 1969.

When the gallows at HMP Barlinnie were removed in 1995, the Perth facility was retained for use in the unlikely event of a death sentence being carried out for one of the remaining capital offences (treason and piracy with violence). After the final abolition of the death penalty for all offences in 1998, it became an officer training facility and was demolished in 2006.

== See also ==
- List of Category A listed buildings in Perth and Kinross
- List of listed buildings in Perth, Scotland
