= Frances Parker =

New Zealand-born suffragette (1875–1924)

Frances Parker OBE
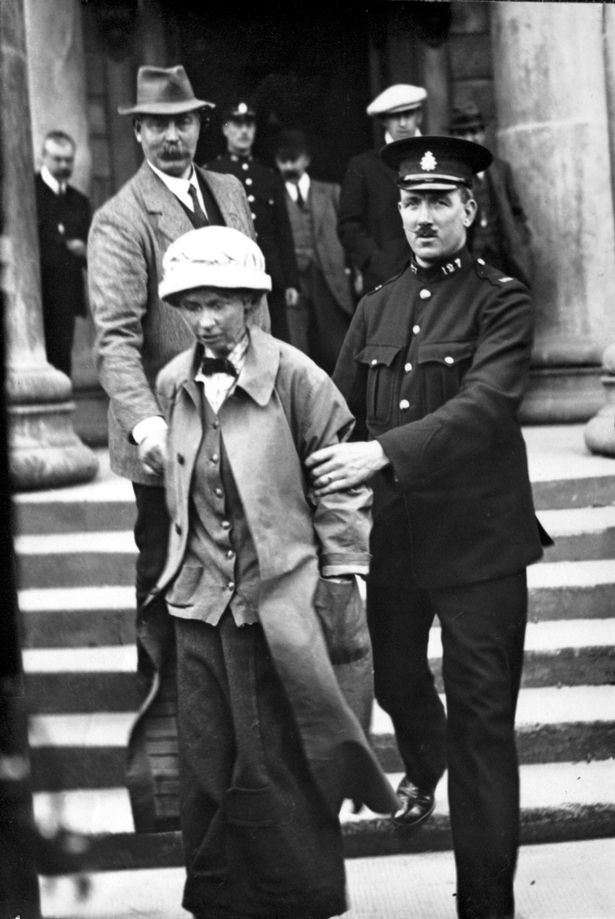
- Parker being escorted from Ayr Sheriff Court by a police officer in 1914
- Born: Frances Mary Parker; 24 December 1875; Kurow, Otago, New Zealand
- Died: 19 January 1924 (aged 48); Arcachon, France
- Education: Newnham College, Cambridge
- Occupation: Suffragette

Frances Mary "Fanny" Parker OBE (24 December 1875 – 19 January 1924) was a New Zealand-born suffragette who became prominent in the militant wing of the Scottish women's suffrage movement and was repeatedly imprisoned for her actions.

== Early life ==
Born in Little Roderick, Kurow, Otago, New Zealand, she was one of five children of Harry Rainy Parker and his wife, Frances Emily Jane Kitchener. Her family lived at the Waihao Downs Homestead from 1870 to 1895, when they moved to Little Roderick. Little Roderick is a division of Station Peak on the north side of the Waitaki River, Waimate District (not in Kurow, as reported elsewhere). Parker came from a well off background and was a niece of Field-Marshal Lord Kitchener. Kitchener came to New Zealand to advise the New Zealand Government on defence in 1910; in February Kitchener went to Rotorua with his sister Mrs Parker (Frances' mother) and Mr Harry Parker.

Her mother died in London in 1925, and believed that her brother was still alive and a prisoner in Germany.

In New Zealand, women were granted the franchise on 19 September 1893 and voted for the first time in the election held on 28 November 1893. Parker left New Zealand in 1896 to study at Newnham College, Cambridge. Her tuition there was paid for by her uncle. She received a degree in 1899, and subsequently spent several years working as a teacher in New Zealand.

== Suffrage work ==
On her return to Britain, Parker began campaigning for women's suffrage, initially as a speaker with the Scottish Universities Women's Suffrage Union, and later with Emmeline Pankhurst's Women's Social and Political Union, for which she became organiser in the West of Scotland in 1912. In October and November 1911, she campaigned in the Kilmarnock and Ayrshire North by-election.

Parker took part in increasingly militant actions, for which she was imprisoned several times. She served six weeks for obstruction in 1908 following a demonstration. Later, she was sentenced to four months in Holloway Prison in March 1912 after taking part in a WSPU-organised window-smashing raid. Parker joined other suffragettes in defiantly embroidering her signature on a piece of cloth, under the eyes of the wardresses, now known as The Suffragette Handkerchief. Like many suffragettes, she went on hunger strike and was subjected to force-feeding.

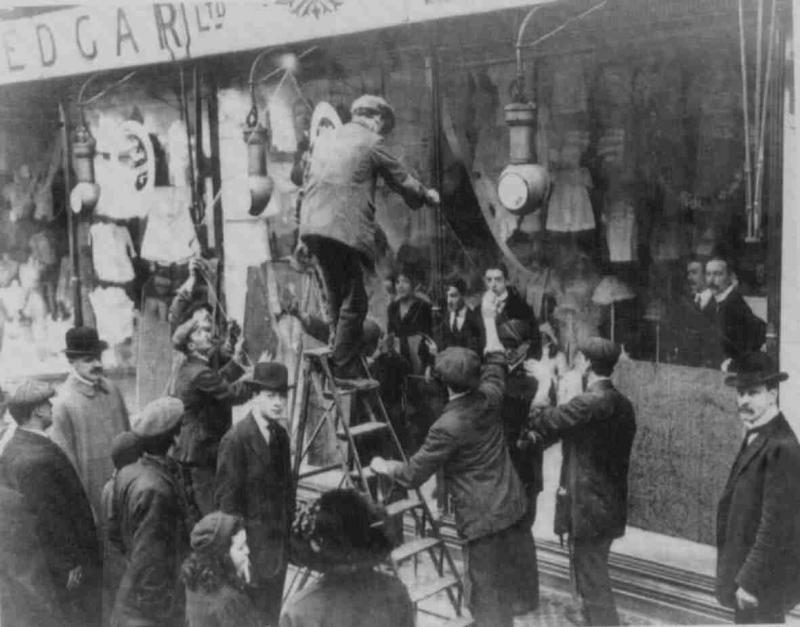
A suffragette window smashing campaign

Later that year she was imprisoned twice, once for breaking windows, and once for breaking into the Music Hall in Aberdeen with the intention of disrupting an appearance by David Lloyd George. On both occasions, she was released after going on hunger-strike for several days.

By 1914, the suffrage movement was becoming increasingly violent, with many buildings around Britain being bombed and burned. In July of that year, Parker and a fellow campaigner, Ethel Moorhead attempted to set fire to Burns Cottage in Alloway. A watchman was on duty, and while Moorhead escaped, Parker was arrested. While on remand, she went on hunger and thirst strike. Knowing that there was little chance of recapturing her if she was released, the prison authorities subjected her to particularly brutal force-feeding; when she was unable to hold down food, they attempted to feed her through her rectum, resulting in serious bruising. There was controversy when Parker wrote about her brutal treatment in 1914 in Votes for Women newspaper, under the name 'Janet Parker' . She was seriously ill when finally released to a nursing home but was still able to escape.

Parker had been given a Hunger Strike Medal "for Valour" by WSPU.

Before she could be recaptured, the First World War broke out, resulting in an end to militant campaigning and an amnesty for suffragettes.

During the war, Parker served in the Women's Army Auxiliary Corps and was awarded an OBE. After the war, she lived in Arcachon, near Bordeaux, where she died in 1924. Parker left her Hunger Strike medal to her friend and fellow activist, Ethel Moorhead.

== Legacy ==
In 2014, Victoria Bianchi wrote a play, CauseWay, based on Parker and Moorhead's attempt to blow up Burns Cottage 100 years previously. The play was performed at the Robert Burns Birthplace Museum in Alloway.

In 2016, the Museum of New Zealand Te Papa Tongarewa purchased Parker's suffragette medal, the Women's Social and Political Union Medal for Valour, from an auction house in Scotland and will display it at the museum in Wellington. It is thought to be the only suffragette medal with a New Zealand connection.

The Suffragette Handkerchief with Parker's embroidered signature and 67 suffragette names or initials can be seen at Priest House, West Hoathly, Sussex.

== See also ==
- List of suffragists and suffragettes
- Women's suffrage in New Zealand
