= Dundee Women's Hospital =

- NHS Tayside
- Shown in Dundee

Geography
- Location: Dundee, Scotland, United Kingdom
- Coordinates: 56.4605°N 3.0171°W

Organisation
- Care system: Public NHS
- Type: Specialist

Services
- Speciality: Women's hospital

History
- Founded: 1897
- Closed: 1975

Links
- Lists: Hospitals in Scotland

Dundee Women's Hospital, officially known as Dundee Women's Hospital and Nursing Home was a hospital for women in Dundee, Scotland. Originally it operated from premises in Seafield Road, it later moved to Elliott Road.

== History ==
The original site selected at 19 Seafield Road had previously been operated by the Misses Niven as a school in the late 19th century.

The hospital was opened in May 1897 at premises in 19 Seafield Road and was also known as Dundee Private Hospital for Women. It had grown out of an earlier dispensary for women and children, which had been formed earlier in the decade to offer women treatment by female doctors. The hospital aimed to provide surgical care at a low cost. Its founders included the Dundee social reformer Mary Lily Walker and the city's first two female doctors Alice Moorhead (the sister of the artist and suffragette Ethel Moorhead) and Emily Thomson. In 1900, its management committee of included Miss Walker and Professor D'Arcy Wentworth Thompson, while Drs Moorhead and Thomson were its medical officers.

In 1915, due to the financial generosity of the Sharp family of Hill of Tarvit, it moved to premises in Elliot Road designed by James Findlay, initially with fourteen beds. It had been planned to move to the new building in 1914, but just prior to its completion it was damaged by fire. The hospital used temporary accommodation in Windsor Street until the damage to the new building was repaired. It became part of the National Health Service in 1948, despite an attempt to stay private, latterly serving as an annex to Dundee Royal Infirmary. It closed around 1975.

== Legacy ==
The remaining archives of the hospital are held by Archive Services at the University of Dundee. The site in Elliot Road was later converted into apartments.
