= Emily Thomson (medical practitioner) =

British medical practitioner

Emily Charlotte Thomson (c. 1864 – 21 August 1955) was a medical practitioner, co-founder of Dundee Women's Hospital and one of the first women admitted to professional medical societies in Scotland.

== Early life and education ==
Emily Charlotte Thomson was born in India to parents Emily Plumb Ogilvie and Alexander Thompson, a schools inspector. She was educated in Dublin, Edinburgh and Rouen and, in 1891, obtained qualifications from three medical licensing authorities in Scotland: the Royal College of Physicians of Edinburgh, Royal College of Surgeons of Edinburgh and Royal College of Physicians and Surgeons of Glasgow. She achieved the Dublin Licentiate in Medicine in 1892 and, in 1899, graduated with a Bachelor of Medicine and Surgery (MBChM) from the University of Edinburgh.

== Career ==
In 1893, Thomson applied successfully to become a member of the Forfarshire Medical Association and, later, the British Medical Association. She joined Mary Lily Walker in co-founding the Dundee Women's Hospital in 1896 and worked as a medical officer in the hospital along with fellow physician Alice Moorhead. Moorhead partnered with Thomson to establish a medical practice at 93 Nethergate in Dundee, later moving to 4 Tay Square in 1901. Together Thomson and Moorhead were the first female doctors in Dundee. Moorhead worked mostly with poorer members of the community, while Thomson tended to the upper classes. After Moorhead's death during childbirth in 1910, Thomson moved practice to 22 Windsor Street in Dundee. She retired from medicine in 1922.

== Personal life ==
In addition to Thomson's medical achievements in Dundee, she was also one of city's first female drivers. She was described by her contemporary Elizabeth Bryson as 'vivid, dark, business-like [and] capable' and her life was the inspiration for the novel Butterflies in December by Eileen Ramsay. In retirement, Thomson moved to Arbirlot where she collected art and antiques until her death in 1955.

== See also ==
- Dundee Women's Hospital
- Women in medicine
