= Irene Collins =

British historian and writer

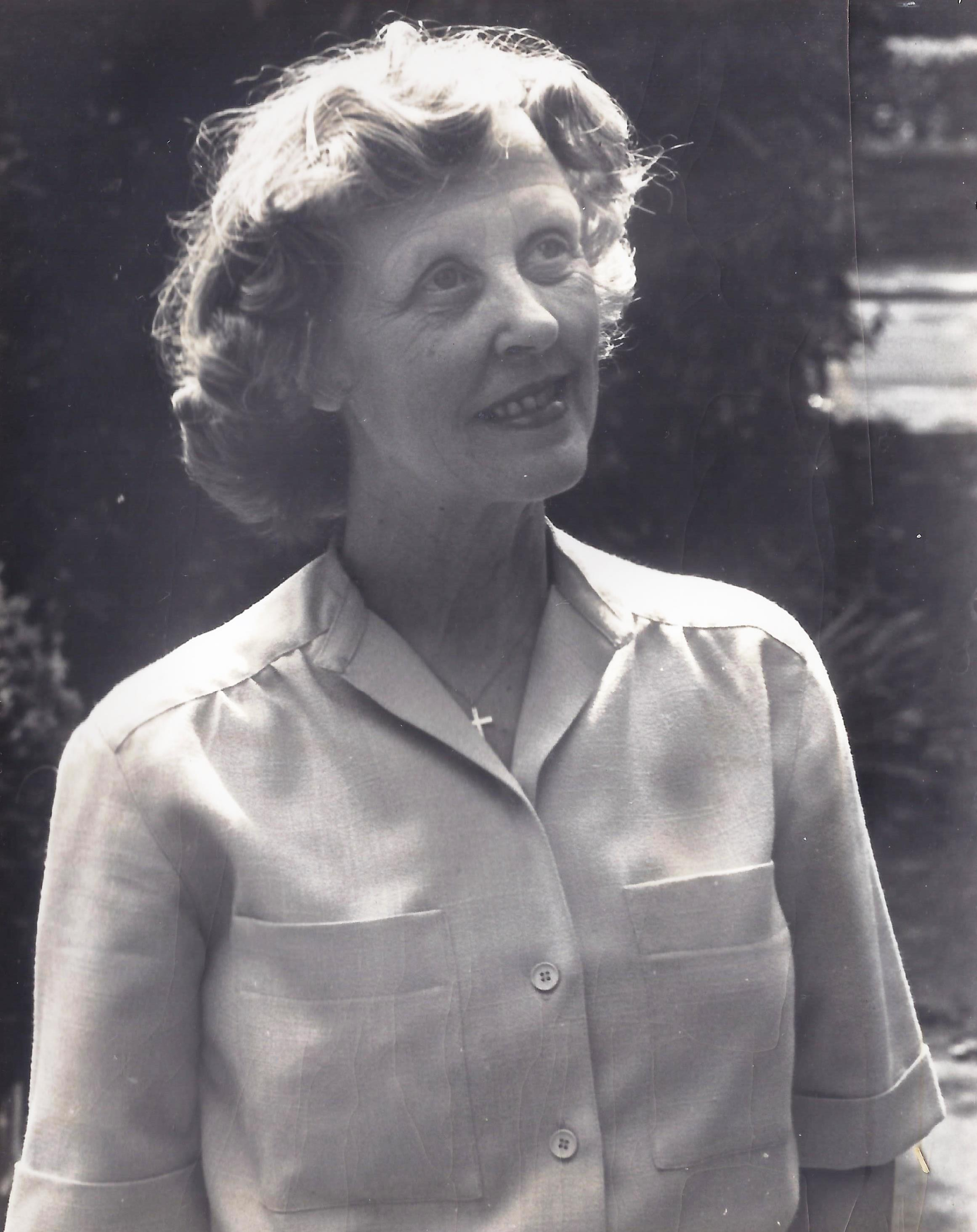
- Irene Collins 1974
- Born: Irene Fozzard; 16 September 1925; Queensbury, Bradford, West Riding of Yorkshire, England
- Died: 12 July 2015 (aged 89)
- Education: St Hilda's College, Oxford
- Occupations: Historian and writer
- Spouse: Rex Owen Collins (m. 1951)

Irene Collins (née Fozzard; 16 September 1925 – 12 July 2015) was a British historian and writer, known for her studies of Napoleon and Jane Austen.

== Early life and family ==
Irene Fozzard was born as the second of identical twins of James Frederick (Fred) Fozzard and Louisa Ratcliffe in Queensbury, Bradford, West Riding of Yorkshire, on 16 September 1925. Her father was a joiner from Leeds, and her mother left school at 12 to work as a burler and mender at the Black Dyke Mill in Queensbury. Irene's twin sister, Jean, died at the age of five.

Collins gained a scholarship to Brighouse Girls' Secondary School. She also gained a major county scholarship to St Hilda's College, Oxford, to read modern history at the age of 17.

== Teaching and work ==
Graduating with a first-class degree in 1946, the 22-year-old Collins was appointed as an assistant lecturer at the University of Liverpool the following year as the department's only female staff member. While teaching at Liverpool, Collins gave lectures on 18th and 19th-century European and British history. Although she found the work isolating at times (for the first two years she rarely saw her colleagues because the art faculty's male and female staff had separate common rooms, and female staff were not permitted to lunch with their male counterparts at the university club), Collins stayed at Liverpool for the next 40 years, became the first female Dean. She took early retirement as Dean and Reader to save the jobs of her younger colleagues.

Her principal subject of research was originally Napoleon; However, after retiring from Liverpool, she wrote her two books on Jane Austen: Jane Austen and the Clergy (1994) and Jane Austen: The Parson's Daughter (1998). The first placed Austen's novels in the framework of the church of the day. The second demonstrated the influence of her clerical upbringing. These were widely read, partly as a result of the 1995 BBC series Pride and Prejudice, and turned her into a practical celebrity among Austenites across the world. Collins became patron of the northern branch of the Jane Austen Society, served as vice-president of the UK Jane Austen Society, and was a keen member of The Jane Austen Society of North America.

She supported the Historical Association's aim of bringing history to a popular, non-academic audience. Collins wrote pamphlets for the association, and gave lectures to local branches. She became the first female president of the association in 1982 and was awarded is highest distinction, the Medlicott Medal, in 1996. She became a Jubilee Fellow of the Association in 2014. Collins was a great supporter of historical scholarship in China and in 1994 was invited to become Advisor to the Centre for British and American Studies at the University of Nanjing.

In 2002, King Alfred's College, Winchester conferred on her the title of Honorary Fellow.

== Personal life ==
While studying at the University of Oxford, Irene met Rex Owen Collins, the son of a Primitive Methodist minister at meetings of a Methodist group which was also attended by Margaret Roberts (later Thatcher). Rex Collins was at Brasenose College on a naval scholarship. They married in 1951 and remained so for 64 years. They had one daughter, Jo, born in 1961, and one grandson, Ben.

Irene Collins was an Anglican (Church of England) all her life. She wrote a history of her local church, St. John the Divine, Brooklands Chapters in Parish History; The First Hundred Years of the Church of St. John the Divine Brooklands (private printing 1968). She also wrote a series of pamphlets Brooklands Past & Present (1992-4) and a light-hearted pamphlet A Disgruntled Guide for the Reluctant Visitor, in response to a national competition for church-guidebook writers. The pamphlet won a special prize (alongside the serious guidebooks) which was presented by Robert Runcie, Archbishop of Canterbury, at Lambeth in 1983.

In 2000, Collins was diagnosed with macular degeneration. Despite progressive loss of her eyesight, she continued to write and lecture until a few months before her death on 12 July 2015.

== Selected works ==
- The Government and the Newspaper Press in France, 1814–1881 (1959)
- The Age of Progress: A Survey of European History Between 1789 and 1870 (1964)
- Government and Society in France 1814–48 (1970)
- Napoleon and his Parliaments 1800–1815 (1979)

=== Historical Association pamphlets ===
- Liberalism in Nineteenth-Century Europe (1957)
- Revolutionaries in Europe 1815–48 (1974)
- Napoleon; First Consul and Emperor of the French (1986)
- Recent Historical Novels (1990)

=== Articles in The English Historical Review ===
- The Government and the Press in France, 1822 to 1827 (Jan 1951)
- The Government and the Press in France during the Reign of Louis-Philippe (April 1954)

=== Miscellaneous work ===
- The Declaration of the Rights of Man and the Citizen 1789 and 1793 (translated with introduction) Pamphlet from Dept of History, University of Liverpool 1985
- Variations on the Theme of Napoleon's Moscow Campaign Chapter in History - the Journal of The Historical Association Vol 71 Feb 1986
- Napoleonic Memorabilia Chapter in Joseph Mayer of Liverpool 1803-1886 eds Margaret Gibson, Susan M. Wright 1988
- Jane Austen's Clergy Families: Real and Imagined Chapter in Sensibilities, the Jane Austen Society of Australia Inc. No.17 Dec 1998
- Charles Dickens and the French Revolution Chapter in Literature and History Vol 1:1 Spring 1990
- The Longbourn Entail Exposition of the entail question in Austentations, the Kent Branch of the Jane Austen Society Vol 10 Spring 2010
- Jane Austen (1775-1817): A Novelist from the Parsonage printed posthumously 2019 Chapter in * Women from the Parsonage eds Cindy K Renker, Susanne Bach
