= Marjorie Reeves =

British historian and educationist

Marjorie Ethel Reeves
- Born: 17 July 1905; Bratton, Wiltshire, England
- Died: 27 November 2003 (aged 98); Oxford, Oxfordshire, England
- Occupations: Historian and educationalist

Marjorie Ethel Reeves, CBE, FBA (17 July 1905 – 27 November 2003) was a British historian and educationalist. She served on several national committees and was a major contributor to the education of history in Britain. She helped create St Anne's College as part of Oxford University in 1952, and she led a revival of interest in the work of Joachim of Fiore.

== Life ==
Marjorie Ethel Reeves was born in 1905 in Bratton in Wiltshire where her father made agricultural machinery. The family were Baptists and her mother was said to have come from a family known for its independent women. She was inspired by the headteacher at the girl's high school in Trowbridge to study history at Oxford University. After graduating with a first-class honours degree (having attended St Hugh's College) she stayed on to take a teaching diploma. Reeves taught for two years in Greenwich at the Roan School for Girls as an assistant mistress before becoming a research fellow at Westfield College in London in 1929. At Westfield she made the unusual choice of studying Joachim of Fiore whose works she had found at Corpus Christi Library. This medieval mystic was to be the subject of her doctorate in 1932 and of her book, The Influence of Prophecy in the Later Middle Ages: a Study in Joachimism (1969). Her interest in Abbot Joachim inspired other academics to study his symbolic figurae and to decipher his writing; this interest led to regular congresses and journal papers. Reeves drew attention to Leone Tondelli who had deciphered Joachim's peculiar diagrams in 1937. In the 1970s an international study centre for Joachim of Fiore was created in San Giovanni in Fiore, and the community also rebuilt Joachim's church. Reeves was to be awarded an honorary citizenship of the commune of San Giovanni.

She began training teachers at St Gabriel's Teacher Training College in Camberwell in 1931. She enjoyed this and developed new approaches, including a syllabus that was aimed at students who preferred hairdressing to history; these students were asked to create classic Egyptian haircuts as part of their history lessons. Reeves was also the general editor for Longman of the "Then and There" series of history books which gave a new approach to history in schools. The books included copies of documents as contemporary sources. Reeves created twelve of the books in the series herself, over thirty years.

Reeves returned to Oxford where she taught for the Society of Oxford Home-Students, a body responsible for educating women which eventually became St Anne's College. Reeves was a member of The Moot, a meeting of people who wanted to discuss the future of education during the war; the group are seen as important in shaping the Education Act 1944. The Moot was also linked to a Student Christian Movement of which Reeves was an active supporter in the 1940s. Decades later, Reeves wrote the history of this group and its association with the Moot. In 1947 she was asked to join the Central Advisory Council for Education. Whilst on this committee she helped with the Crowther Report that advised raising the school leaving age for children in Britain to 16.

Reeves had a long association with St Anne's College, serving as a fellow and as a tutor who was involved in creating the conditions for the college to become a constituent part of Oxford University in 1952. She was the vice-principal of the college from 1951 to 1967, and later helped ready her college to admit men in 1979. In 1977 she was a Distinguished Professor in Medieval Studies at the University of California. At the age of 98 she was still an honorary fellow of St Anne's College. She died in Oxford on 27 November 2003.

== Honours ==
In 1974, she was elected a Fellow of the British Academy (FBA), the United Kingdom's national academy for the humanities and social sciences. She was given the Medlicott Medal by the Historical Association in 1993 for improving history education. In the 1996 Birthday Honours she was made a Commander of the Order of the British Empire (CBE). She had also been awarded honorary citizenship of the commune of San Giovanni.

== Selected works ==
- Marjorie Reeves (1969). The Influence of Prophecy in the Later Middle Ages: A Study in Joachimism. Clarendon Press. ISBN 978-0-19-827030-0.
- Marjorie Reeves (1980). Sheep Bell and Ploughshare: The Story of Two Village Families. Granada. ISBN 978-0-586-08349-9.
- Christian Thinking and Social Order: Conviction Politics from the 1930s to the Present Day, 1999
- Gould, Warwick; Reeves, Marjorie (2001). Joachim of Fiore and the myth of the Eternal Evangel in the nineteenth and twentieth centuries (2nd ed.). Oxford: Clarendon Press. ISBN 978-0199242306.
- Favourite Hymns, 2006
