= Rachel Reid =

Rachel Reid may refer to:

- Rachel Reid (historian) (1876–1952), English historian
- Rachel Reid (author), (born 1980) Canadian author
