= F. G. Emmison =

British archivist

F. G. Emmison MBE FSA FRHistS
- Born: 28 May 1907; Bedford, England
- Died: 9 November 1995 (aged 88)
- Education: Bedford Modern School

Frederick George "Derick" Emmison MBE FSA FRHistS (28 May 1907 – 9 November 1995) was a British archivist, author and historian. He was County Archivist for Bedfordshire between 1925 and 1938, County Archivist for Essex between 1938 and 1969, a founder member of the British Records Association and the Society of Archivists, and a winner of the John Bickersteth Medal in 1974 and the Medlicott Medal in 1987. He was also a prolific author who made a significant contribution to our understanding of the Elizabethan era through close analysis of the minutiae of local records of that age in Essex.

== Early life and education ==
Frederick George Emmison was born in Bedford on 28 May 1907. He was educated at Bedford Modern School where he excelled academically but was forced to abandon hopes of a University education when his father mistakenly thought a family investment had failed.

== Career ==
At the age of 16, Emmison joined the Bedfordshire Record Office in Bedford under the directorship of Dr G. H. Fowler, then Chairman of the Bedfordshire Records Committee. He was quick to master the work and earn the respect of the county with many important documents being deposited at the record office during his tenure by local churches in particular.

Emmison was County Archivist for Bedfordshire between 1925 and 1938; and County Archivist at Essex Record Office in Chelmsford between 1938 and 1969. His "energetic and imaginative approach impressed many", and Essex was considered to have the leading record system in the country. In time the Essex Record Office became a publishing house for local history and Emmison became a prolific author. His Tudor Secretary: Sir William Petre at Court and Home was a "significant contribution to Tudor studies". His Elizabethan Life series "demonstrated the richness of sources for the period and his ability to relate local material to the wider canvas".

Emmison was a founder member of the British Records Association in 1932 and the Society of Local Archivists in 1947.

== Family ==
In 1935 he married fellow archivist Margaret Moorhead Langwill, daughter of pioneering physician Alice Moorhead and her husband, Dr Hamilton Graham Langwill. Her maternal aunt was Ethel Moorhead and her grandfather was Brigadier Surgeon George Alexander Moorhead.

== Awards and honours ==
Emmison was a Liveryman of the Worshipful Company of Scriveners and a Fellow of the Society of Antiquaries of London, the Royal Historical Society and the Society of Genealogists. He was President or Vice-President of the Historical Association, the British Records Association, the Society of Archivists and the Society of Genealogists.

Emmison was appointed a Member of the Order of the British Empire in 1966 for his work as County Archivist of Essex. He was awarded an Honorary Doctorate by the University of Essex in 1970 and was winner of the John Bickersteth Medal in 1974 and the Medlicott Medal in 1987.

== Selected bibliography ==
- Tudor Secretary: Sir William Petre At Court And Home. Published by Harvard University Press, 1961
- Introduction to Archives. Published by British Broadcasting Corporation, 1964
- Tudor Food And Pastimes. Published by Ernest Benn Limited, London, 1964
- How To Read Local Archives, 1550–1770. Published by Historical Association, London, 1967
- Elizabethan Life. Disorder: mainly from Essex Sessions and Assize Records. Published by Essex Record Office Publications, Chelmsford, 1970
- Elizabethan Life: Morals And The Church Courts. Published by Essex County Council, Chelmsford, 1973
- Elizabethan Life: Home, Work & Land: From Essex Wills And Sessions And Manorial Records. Published by Essex County Council, Chelmsford, 1976
- Elizabethan Life. Wills of Essex Gentry & Merchants Proved in the Prerogative Court of Canterbury. Published by Essex Record Office Publications, Chelmsford, 1978
