= Darcy Thompson =

Darcy Thompson may refer to:

- D'Arcy Wentworth Thompson (1860–1948), Scottish biologist, mathematician and classics scholar
- Darcy Thompson (cyclist), Australian Paralympic cyclist
