= Warwick Gould =

Australian-born British literary scholar (1947–2025)

Warwick Leslie Gould, FRSL, FSA, FRSA, (7 April 1947 – 25 December 2025) was an Australian-born British literary scholar born in Sydney. He specialized in the Irish Literary Revival, particularly in the writings of W. B. Yeats, and in Textual Transmission studies and the History of the Book. Having studied at the University of Queensland, he joined Royal Holloway and Bedford New College in 1973 as a Lecturer in English Language and Literature. He became Professor of English Literature of the University of London (1994–2013) and was the Founding Director of the Institute of English Studies in the university's School of Advanced Study (1999–2013). He continued as Professor Emeritus since his retirement in 2013 and was a Senior Research Fellow of the institute. Gould died on 25 December 2025, at the age of 78.

== Honours ==
In 1997, Gould was elected a Fellow of the Royal Society of Literature (FRSL). He was awarded the 2012 President's Medal by the British Academy: it is awarded "to recognise outstanding service to the cause of the humanities and social sciences". He was an Hon. Life Member of the Antiquarian Booksellers Association, and was elected to Fellowship of the Society of Antiquaries in 2022, and as an Honorary Foreign Corresponding Member of the Grolier Club of New York in the same year.

== Selected works ==
- Gould, Warwick; Reeves, Marjorie (1987). Joachim of Fiore and the Myth of the Eternal Evangel in the Nineteenth Century (1st ed.). Oxford: Clarendon Press. ISBN 978-0198266723.
- Gould, Warwick; Kelly, John; Toomey, Deirdre, eds. (1997). The Collected Letters of W. B. Yeats, Vol. 2: 1896-1900. Oxford: Oxford University Press. ISBN 978-0198126829.
- Gould, Warwick; Reeves, Marjorie (2001). Joachim of Fiore and the Myth of the Eternal Evangel in the Nineteenth and Twentieth Centuries (2nd ed.). Oxford: Clarendon Press. ISBN 978-0199242306.
- Gould, Warwick; Toomey, Deirdre, eds. (2005). Mythologies by W. B. Yeats. London: Palgrave Macmillan. ISBN 978-1403945051.
- Gould, Warwick, ed. (2013). The Living Stream: Essays in Memory of A. Norman Jeffares. Yeats Annual. Open Book Publishers. ISBN 9781909254350.
- Gould, Warwick, ed. (2019). Yeats's Legacies. Yeats Annual. Vol. 21. Open Book Publishers. doi:10.11647/obp.0135. ISBN 978-1-78374-454-1.
