= Medlicott Medal =

Award for historians

The Medlicott Medal for Service to History is awarded annually by the Historical Association. The idea of a medal for outstanding contributions to history originated in 1983 with a proposal from Professor Donald Read, then President of the Historical Association. The award is named after William Norton Medlicott, and was first awarded in 1985.

Twenty-seven men have won the award, and nine women.

== Winners ==
- 2026 Anne Curry
- 2025 Christine Counsell
- 2024 Catherine Hall
- 2023 Diarmaid MacCulloch
- 2022 David Olusoga
- 2021 Rana Mitter
- 2020 Not awarded
- 2019 Janet L. Nelson
- 2018 Justin Champion
- 2017 Mary Beard
- 2016 Antony Beevor
- 2015 Margaret MacMillan
- 2014 Richard J. Evans
- 2013 David Cannadine
- 2012 Bettany Hughes
- 2011 Michael Wood
- 2010 Peter Hennessy
- 2009 Melvyn Bragg
- 2008 Gordon Batho
- 2007 Chris Culpin
- 2006 Lisa Jardine
- 2005 Martin Gilbert
- 2004 Ian Kershaw
- 2003 Keith Thomas
- 2002 Simon Schama
- 2001 David Starkey (Award withdrawn July 2020)
- 2000 Antonia Fraser
- 1999 Eric Hobsbawm
- 1998 Patrick Collinson
- 1997 Roy Jenkins
- 1996 Irene Collins
- 1995 John West
- 1994 R. R. Davies
- 1993 Marjorie Reeves
- 1992 Lord Bullock
- 1991 Neil Cossons
- 1990 John Fines
- 1989 Magnus Magnusson
- 1988 Ragnhild Hatton
- 1987 Frederick George Emmison
- 1986 H. R. Loyn
- 1985 A. G. Dickens
