= George Alexander Moorhead =

British military doctor

Brigadier Surgeon George Alexander Moorhead MD LRCSI MRCPI (30 November 1829 – 11 February 1912) was a British military surgeon. He was father to Alice Moorhead and Ethel Moorhead.

== Life ==
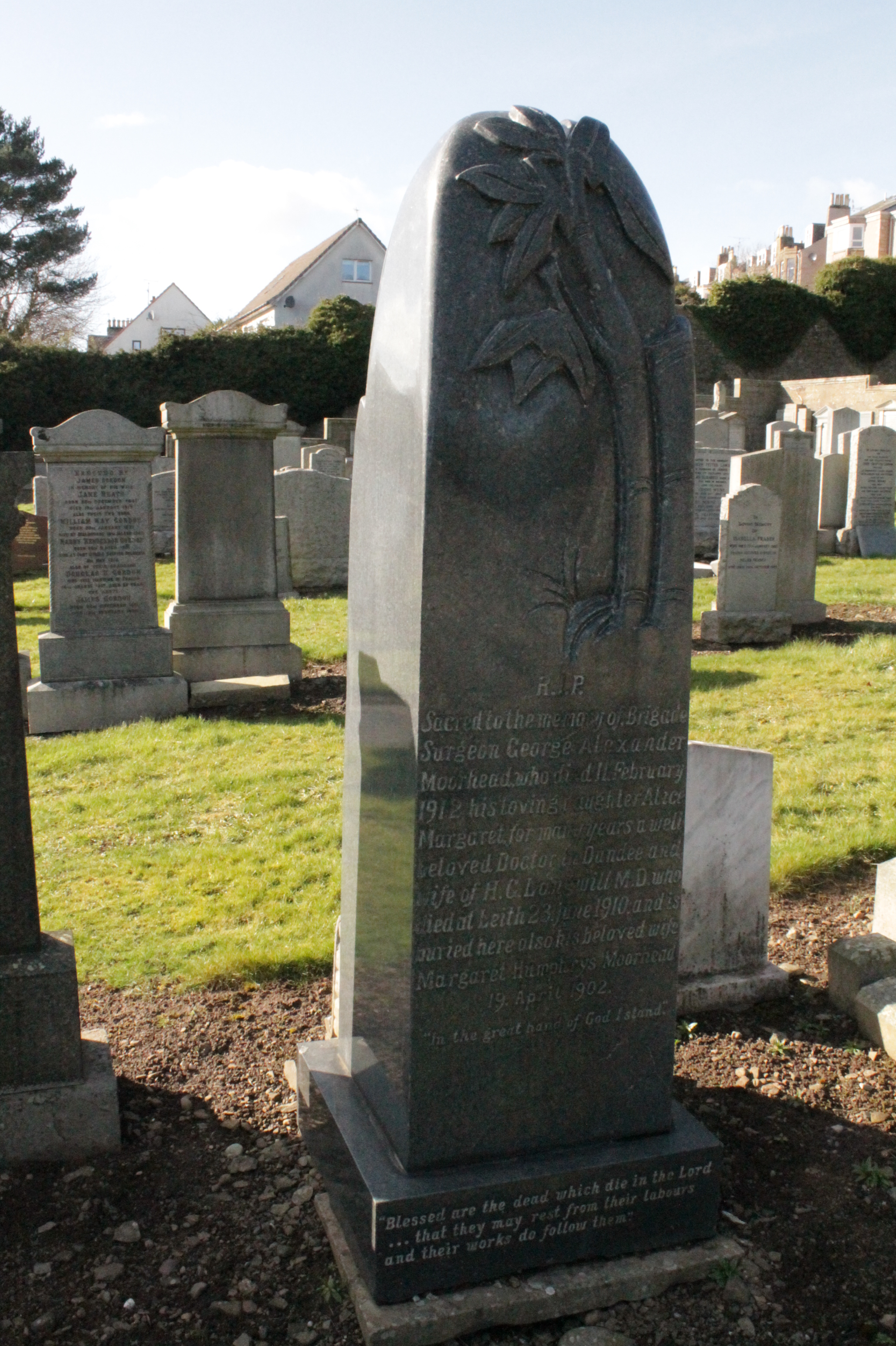
The Moorhead grave, Western Cemetery, Dundee

He was born in Naas, County Kildare in central Ireland on 30 November 1829. He came from a long line of doctors.

He qualified as a physician and surgeon at Trinity College Dublin, in Ireland, around 1853. He received his doctorate (MD) in 1859 whilst already occupied as an army surgeon, serving with the Berkshire Regiment in India. The regiment had been sent to India in 1857 to suppress the Indian Mutiny. He appears as an Assistant Surgeon in a regimental photograph of the 66th Regiment taken in Bangalore in 1863.

The regiment returned to England in 1865 but was returned to India in 1870.

He was promoted to Surgeon Major in 1873. He served in Afghanistan with the Regiment from 1880. He was present at the aftermath of the tragic Battle of Maiwand in July 1880.

He was retired in 1894 (surgeons were generally retired at 55) and began spending time in Dundee, visiting his daughter, who had set up the first all-female practise in the city. He would have advised her on the foundation of Dundee Women's Hospital in 1897. He moved to Dundee permanently in 1901. He lived with his wife at 20 Magdalen Yard Road. Ironically his daughter married a few years after he arrived and relocated to Leith.

He is the likely source of the poem "The Battle of Maiwand" by fellow Dundee resident William McGonagal written in 1899.

He later lived (alone apart from his servants) at "The Weisha" a villa on the Ninewells site.

He died on 11 February 1912. He is buried with his wife and daughter in the Western Cemetery, Dundee. His very distinctive grave, in black polished basalt, bears a palm tree.

His house and grounds were later used to build the Ninewells Hospital. It is not clear if this is a coincidence or a gift.

== Family ==
In November 1864, in the Roman Catholic Cathedral in Madras, he was married to Margaret Humphrys (1832-1902) from Portarlington, youngest daughter of Capt. John Gourlin Humphreys or Humphrys (died 1864). She stayed with him in India and when the regiment returned to England in 1865 they settled in Maidstone in Kent and began a family. They stayed in England when he returned to India. The family probably saw little of him but were well provided for.

They were parents to the female medical pioneer Dr Alice Moorhead and the suffragette Ethel Moorhead.

His granddaughter Margaret Moorhead Langwill married F. G. Emmison.
