= D'Arcy Thompson Zoology Museum =

Coordinates: 56°27′28″N 2°58′43″W

- Established: 1880s
- Location: University of Dundee, Carnelley Building, Park Place, Dundee DD1 4HN, Scotland
- Type: University museum, zoology collection
- Website: www.dundee.ac.uk

The D'Arcy Thompson Zoology Museum is a museum of zoology at the University of Dundee in Scotland.

The museum is named after the Scottish biologist and mathematician D'Arcy Thompson (1860–1948), who founded it in the 1880s. Thompson began acquiring specimens for a museum immediately on taking up the post of Professor of Biology at what was then University College, Dundee in 1885. An extension to his department in 1893 allowed the creation of a purpose-built museum, which grew to become one of the largest museums of its kind in Britain at the time.

The original museum building was demolished along with its neighbours in 1956–57 to make way for the Tower Building, and much of Thompson's original collection was dispersed. The remaining material was kept in storage for many years before new museum displays were created in the Biological Sciences Institute in the 1980s. This building was itself later demolished, and in 2007 a new museum was created in the Carnelley Building, formally named the D’Arcy Thompson Zoology Museum after its founder.

The museum has a collection of birds, fish, insects, mammals, and reptiles from around the world, together with many of D'Arcy Thompson's original models and teaching aids, including Glass Sea Creatures by Leopold and Rudolf Blaschka and model and fluid preparations by Vaclav Fric. Many of the specimens and models relate to Thompson's interest in mathematical biology, which led to his celebrated book On Growth and Form.

The museum has 27 specimens from the voyage of HMS Challenger of 1872–1876 and material from several other notable expeditions including the Dundee Antarctic Expedition of 1892–3, the Ingolf Expedition of 1895–6, the Nimrod Expedition of 1907-9 and the Discovery Investigations of the 1930s. There are also specimens of various extinct species including Huia and Thylacine.

The museum also has an art collection inspired by the work of D'Arcy Thompson including his 1917 book On Growth and Form, part of which was funded by the UK Art Fund. It includes works by Henry Moore, Victor Pasmore, Wilhelmina Barns-Graham, William Turnbull and Salvador Dalí, an original catalogue from Richard Hamilton’s. Growth and Form exhibition (1951) and digital art of cellular forms by Andy Lomas.
