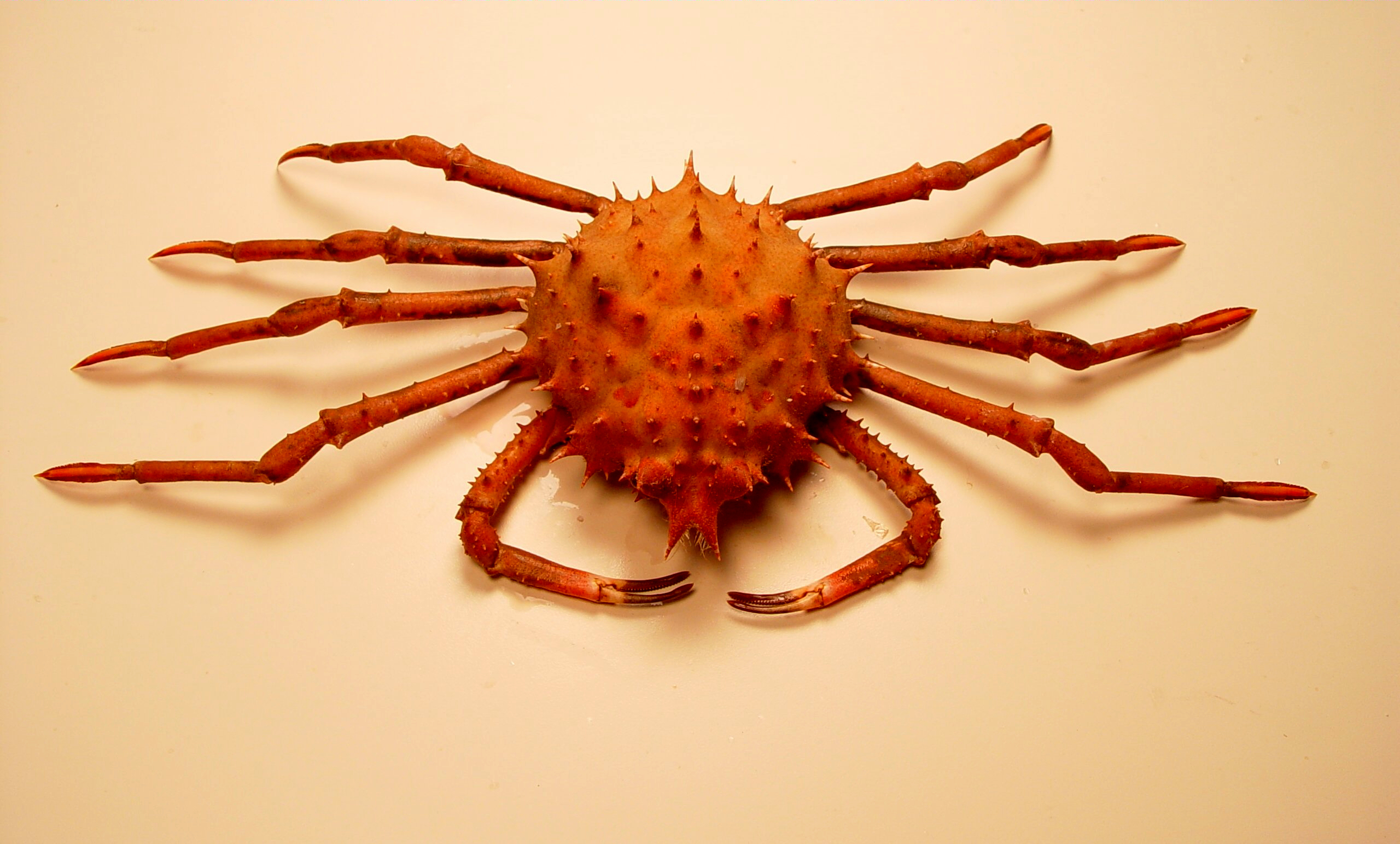

Scientific classification
- Kingdom: Animalia
- Phylum: Arthropoda
- Clade: Pancrustacea
- Class: Malacostraca
- Order: Decapoda
- Suborder: Pleocyemata
- Infraorder: Brachyura
- Family: Epialtidae
- Genus: Rochinia
- Species: R. crassa

Binomial name
- Rochinia crassa (A. Milne-Edwards, 1879)

= Rochinia crassa =

Species of crab

Rochinia crassa, also known as the inflated spiny crab, is a species of crab in the family Epialtidae.

== Description ==
Rochinia crassa has a spiny, elongate-triancular carapace. The rostrum comprises two short, stout spines. The chelipeds are very long and thin, and in adults can be approximately four times the length of the carpace. The walking legs are also long and slender.

== Distribution ==
This species is found in the western Atlantic including the Gulf of Mexico, and ranges from Nova Scotia, Canada in the north, to Massachusetts and Texas in United States waters. It also occurs from northern Cuba to Colombia and French Guiana.

== Habitat ==
It lives in soft bottoms, in substrates of mud and sand at depths of between 66 and 1,216 metres. This species does not occur near vents or seep sites.
