= D'Arcy Wentworth Thompson =

Scottish biologist, mathematician, and classics scholar

D'Arcy Wentworth Thompson CB FRS FRSE
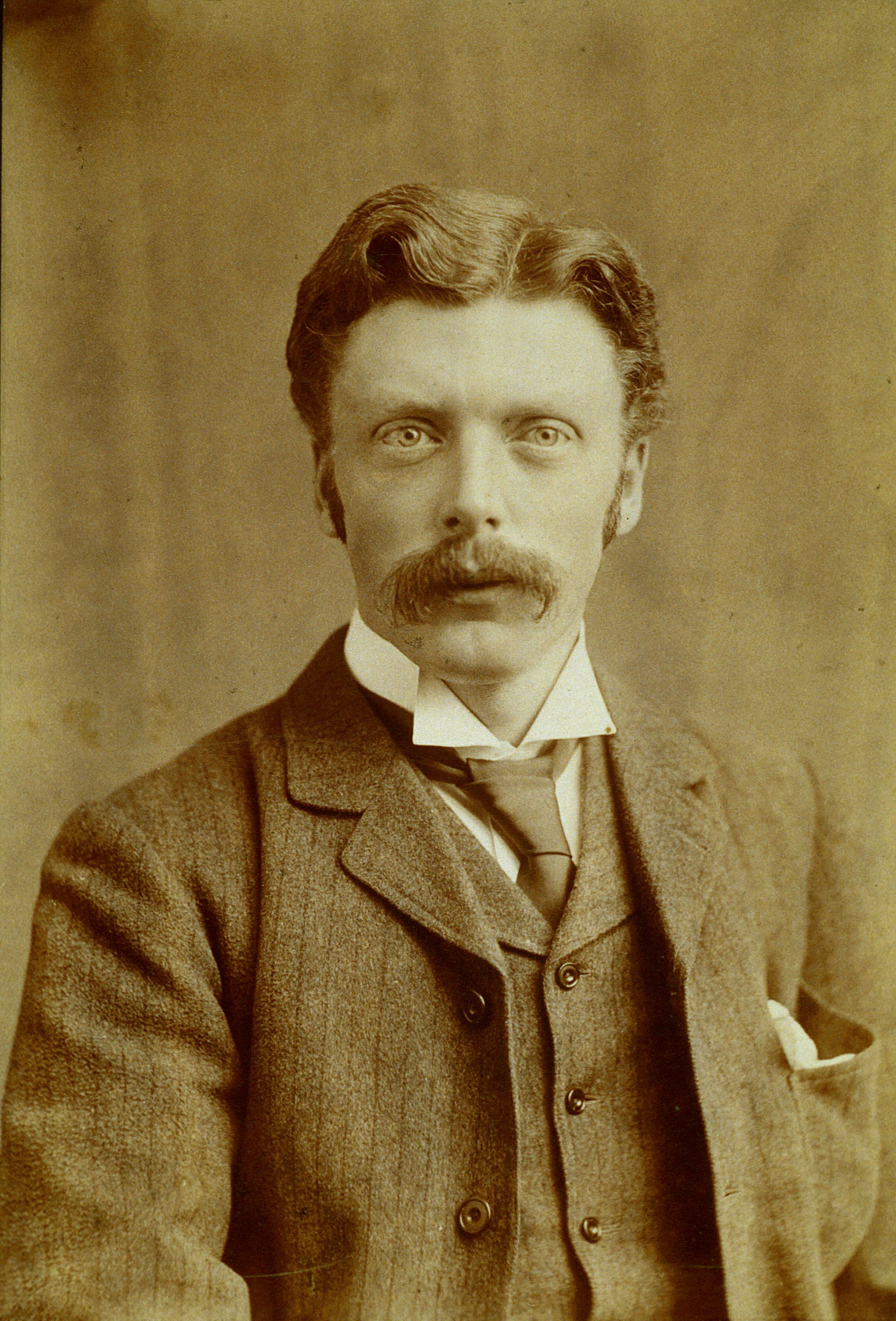
- Thompson in 1886
- Born: 2 May 1860; Edinburgh, Scotland
- Died: 21 June 1948 (aged 88); St Andrews, Scotland
- Education: University of Edinburgh; Trinity College, Cambridge (BA)
- Occupation: Mathematical biologist
- Known for: On Growth and Form
- Spouse: Maureen Drury (m. 1901)
- Children: 3 daughters
- Awards: Linnean Medal (1938); Darwin Medal (1946)
- Scientific career
- Fields: Biology, Natural history, Mathematics
- Institutions: University College, Dundee; University of St Andrews

Sir D'Arcy Wentworth Thompson CB FRS FRSE (2 May 1860 – 21 June 1948) was a Scottish biologist, classicist and mathematician. He was a pioneer of mathematical and theoretical biology, travelled on expeditions to the Bering Strait and held the position of Professor of Natural History at University College, Dundee for 32 years, then at St Andrews for 31 years. He was elected a Fellow of the Royal Society, was knighted, and received the Darwin Medal and the Daniel Giraud Elliot Medal.

Thompson is remembered as the author of the 1917 book On Growth and Form, which led the way for the scientific explanation of morphogenesis, the process by which patterns and body structures are formed in plants and animals.

Thompson's description of the mathematical beauty of nature, and the mathematical basis of the forms of animals and plants, stimulated thinkers as diverse as Julian Huxley, C. H. Waddington, Alan Turing, René Thom, Claude Lévi-Strauss, Eduardo Paolozzi, Le Corbusier, Christopher Alexander and Mies van der Rohe. He gave the 1918 Royal Institution Christmas Lectures on "The Fish of the Sea".

== Life ==
=== Early life ===
Thompson was born at 3 Brandon Street in Edinburgh to Fanny Gamgee (sister of Sampson Gamgee) and D'Arcy Wentworth Thompson (1829–1902), Classics Master at Edinburgh Academy and later Professor of Greek at Queen's College, Galway. His mother, Fanny Gamgee (1840–1860), died 9 days after his birth as a result of complications and he was brought up by his maternal grandfather Joseph Gamgee (1801–1895), a veterinary surgeon. He lived with his grandfather and uncle, John Gamgee, at 12 Castle Terrace, facing north onto Edinburgh Castle.

From 1870 to 1877 he attended The Edinburgh Academy and won the 1st Edinburgh Academical Club Prize in 1877. In 1878, he matriculated at the University of Edinburgh to study medicine. Two years later, he moved to Trinity College, Cambridge to study zoology. As a student at Cambridge, D'Arcy Thompson was first a sizar, and then received a scholarship. To earn money to support his education he translated Hermann Müller's work on the fertilisation of flowers, because the topic appealed to him. His translation was published in 1883, and included an introduction by Charles Darwin. He speculated later, that if he had chosen to translate Wilhelm Olbers Focke's hybridisation of flowers, he "might have anticipated the discovery of Mendel by twenty years". He graduated with a Bachelor of Arts degree in Natural Science in 1883.

=== Career ===
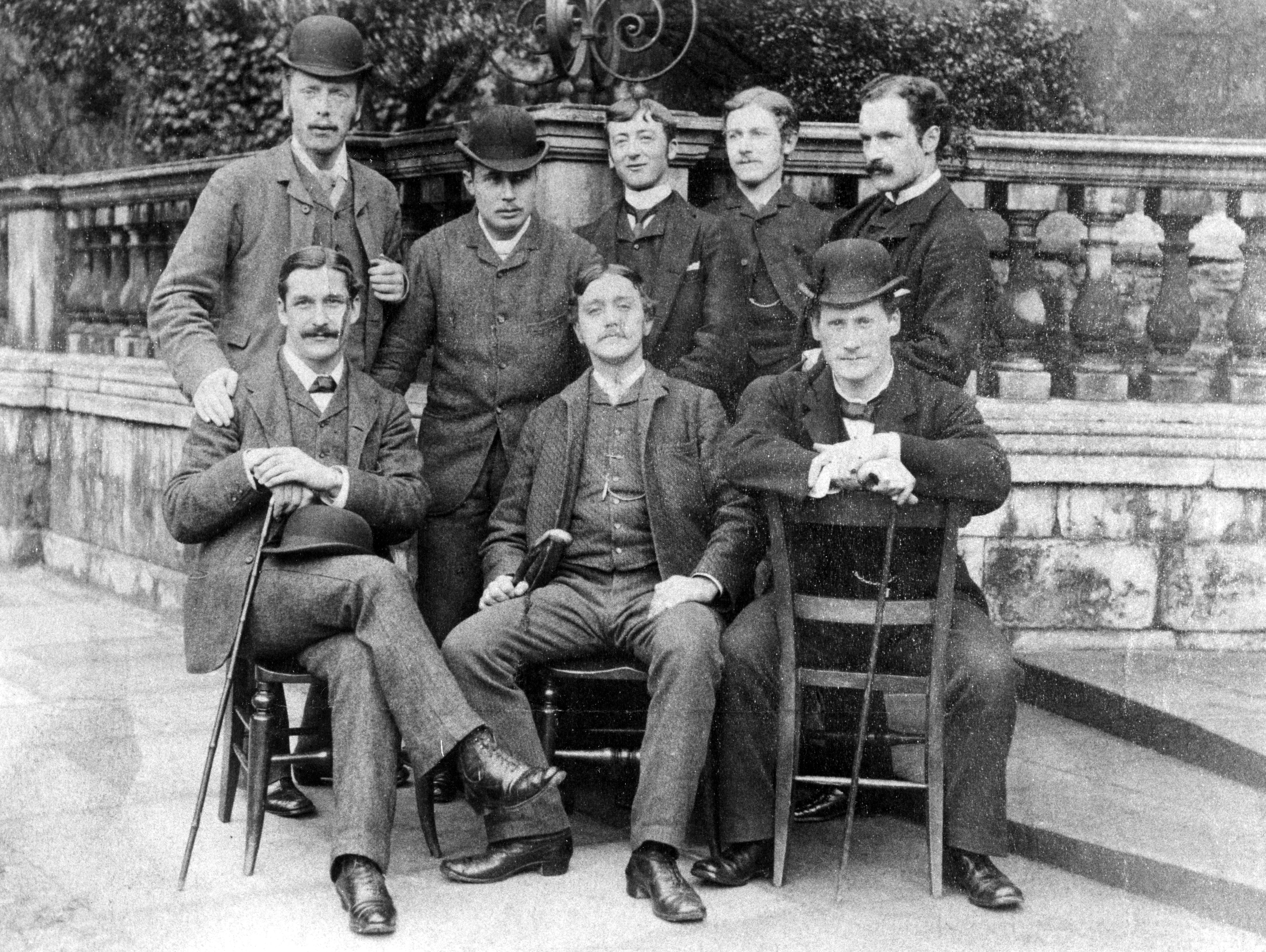
D'Arcy Wentworth Thompson at Trinity College, Cambridge, ca. 1883

From 1883 to 1884, Thompson stayed in Cambridge as a Junior Demonstrator in physiology, teaching students. In 1884, he was appointed Professor of Biology (later Natural History) at University College, Dundee, a post he held for 32 years. One of his first tasks was to create a Zoology Museum for teaching and research, now named after him.

In 1885 he was elected a Fellow of the Royal Society of Edinburgh. His proposers were Patrick Geddes, Frank W. Young, William Evans Hoyle and Daniel John Cunningham. He served as vice president to the Society from 1916 to 1919 and as president from 1934 to 1939.

In 1896 and 1897, he went on expeditions to the Bering Straits, representing the British Government in an international inquiry into the fur seal industry to assess the fur seal's declining numbers. "Thompson's diplomacy avoided an international incident" between Russia and the United States which both had hunting interests in this area.

His final report for the government drew attention also to the near extinction of the sea otter and whale populations. He became one of the first to press for conservation agreements, and his recommendations contributed to the issuing of species protection orders. He subsequently was appointed Scientific Member of the Fishery Board for Scotland and later, representative to the International Council for the Exploration of the Sea.

He took the opportunity to collect many valuable specimens for his museum, one of the largest in the country at the time, specialising in Arctic zoology, through his links to the Dundee whalers. The D'Arcy Thompson Zoology Museum still has (in 2012) the Japanese spider crab that he collected, and the rare skeleton of a Steller's Sea Cow.

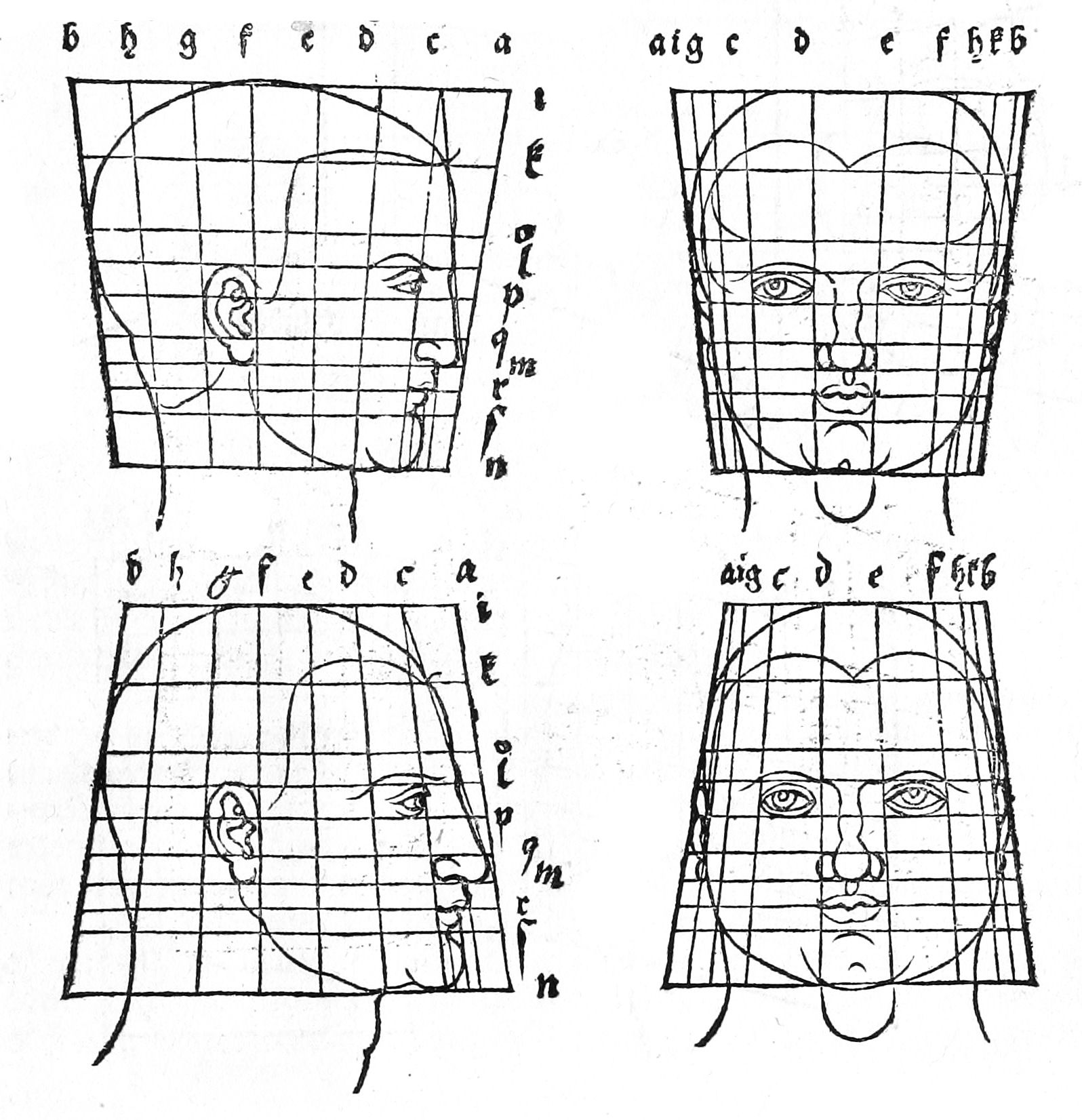
Thompson was inspired by the work of Albrecht Dürer.

Whilst in Dundee, Thompson sat on the committee of management of the Dundee Private Hospital for Women. He was a founder member of the Dundee Social Union and pressed for it "to buy four slum properties in the town", which they renovated so that "the poorest families of Dundee could live there." He encouraged and supported the social reformer Mary Lily Walker in her work with the social union.

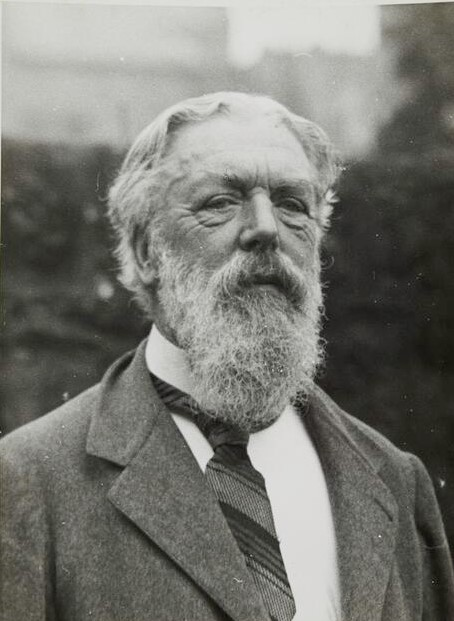
Thompson between 1895 and 1905

In 1917, aged 57, Thompson was appointed to the Chair of Natural History at the University of St Andrews, where he remained for the last 31 years of his life. In 1918 he delivered the Royal Institution Christmas Lecture on The Fish of the Sea. The German British mathematician Walter Ledermann described in his memoir how, as an assistant in Mathematics, he met the biology Professor Thompson at St Andrews in the mid 1930s and how Thompson "was fond of exercising his skills as an amateur of mathematics", that "he used quite sophisticated mathematical methods to elucidate the shapes that occur in the living world" and "[...] differential equations, a subject which evidently lay outside d'Arcy Thompson's fields of knowledge at that time." Ledermann wrote how on one occasion he helped him, working and writing out the answer to his question.

In Country Life magazine in October 1923, he wrote:

"This is but a little town, and our lives are somewhat narrow who dwell therein; but its traditions are not lost, nor the lessons of its long history thrown away.... the stones cry out to us as we pass.... only last week I went down to the little ancient church of Saint-Julien-le-Pauvre in Paris, and passed through it to stand for a moment (as I often do) in the deserted garden whence one looks across the river and gets the finest view of all of Notre Dame.... here have been civilization, religion and learning for a few short centuries longer than in St Andrews.... yet these two spots have a like influence on my mind and rejoice my heart with a train of shadowy memories."

— D'Arcy Wentworth Thompson (1923) The Essay on St Andrews.

=== Family ===
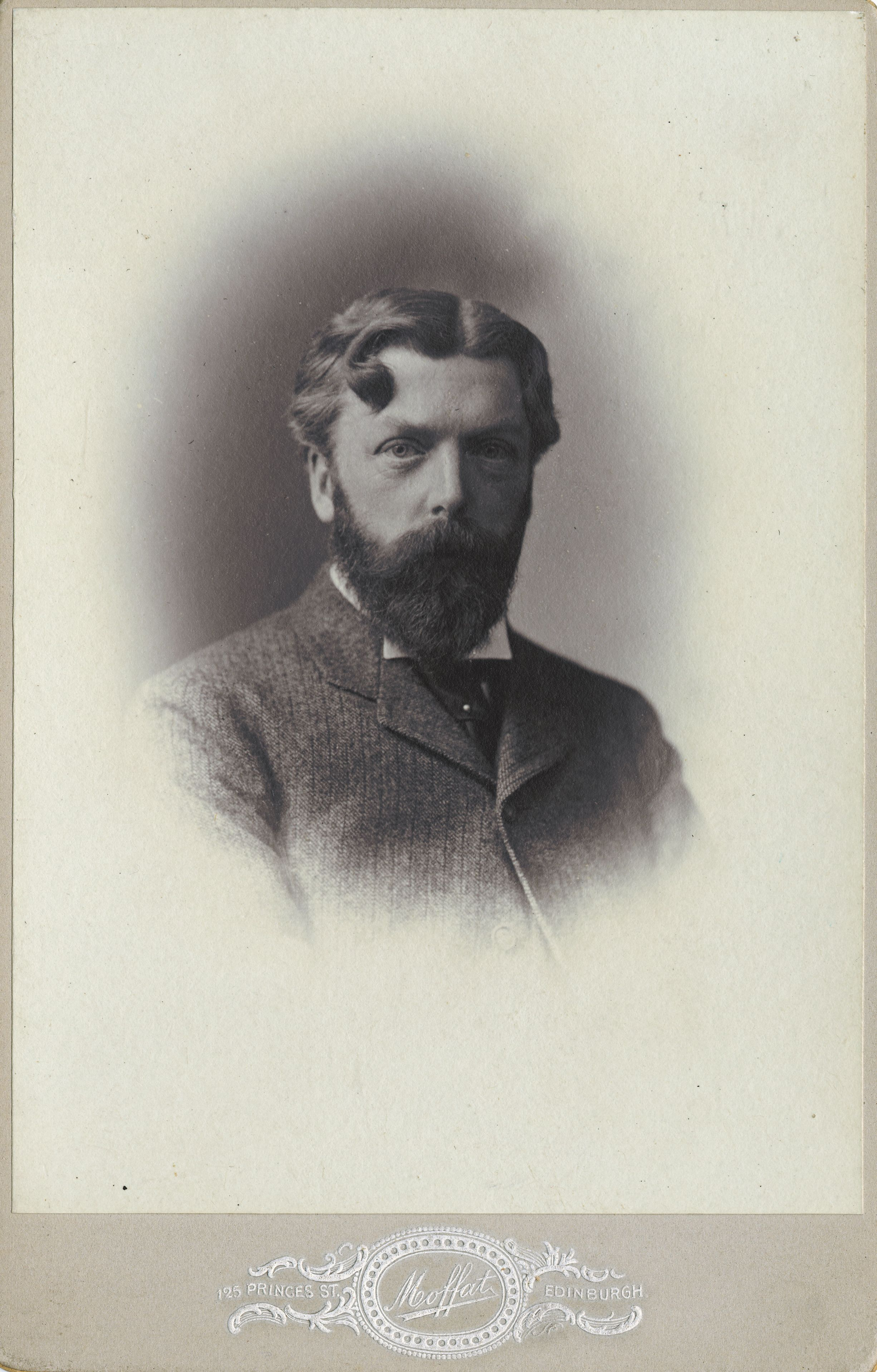
Thompson, ca. 1906

On 4 July 1901 Thompson married Maureen, elder daughter of William Drury, of Dublin. His wife and three daughters survived him.

He died at his home in St Andrews after flying home from India in 1948, at the age of 87, having attended the Science Congress at Delhi, and staying in India for some months. Upon returning, "he suffered a breakdown in health, from which he never fully recovered." He is buried with his maternal grandparents, the Gamgees, and half-sisters in Dean Cemetery in western Edinburgh.

== Major works ==
=== History of Animals ===
In 1910, Thompson published his translation of Aristotle's History of Animals. He had worked on the enormous task intermittently for many years. It was not the first translation of the book into English, but the earlier attempts by Thomas Taylor (1809) and Richard Cresswell (1862) were inaccurate, and criticised at the time as showing "not only an inadequate knowledge of Greek, but an extremely imperfect acquaintance with zoology". Thompson's version benefited from his excellent Greek, his expertise in zoology, his "full" knowledge of Aristotle's biology, and his command of the English language, resulting in a fine translation, "correct, free and .. idiomatic". More recently, the evolutionary biologist Armand Leroi admired Thompson's translation:

In Thompson's hands, Aristotle's worried prose acquires a subdued grandeur. 'All viviparous quadrupeds, then, are furnished with an oesophagus and a windpipe, situated as in man; the same statement is applicable to oviparous quadrupeds and birds, only that the latter present diversities in the shapes of these organs.'

=== On Growth and Form ===
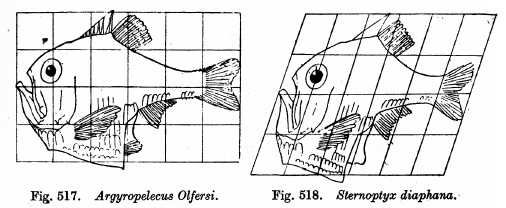
Thompson illustrated the transformation of Argyropelecus olfersi into Sternoptyx diaphana by applying a 20° shear mapping.

Thompson's most famous work, On Growth and Form, led the way for the scientific explanation of morphogenesis, the process by which patterns and body structures are formed in plants and animals. It was written in Dundee, mostly in 1915, though wartime shortages and his many last-minute alterations delayed publication until 1917. The central theme of the book is that biologists of its author's day overemphasized evolution as the fundamental determinant of the form and structure of living organisms, and underemphasized the roles of physical laws and mechanics. He had previously criticized Darwinism in his paper Some Difficulties of Darwinism in an 1894 meeting for the British Association for the Advancement of Science. On Growth and Form explained in detail why he believed Darwinism to be an inadequate explanation for the origin of new species. He did not openly reject natural selection, but regarded it as secondary to the origin of biological form. Instead, he advocated structuralism as an alternative to natural selection in governing the form of species, with a hint that vitalism was the unseen driving force.

On the concept of allometry, the study of the relationship of body size and shape, Thompson wrote:

An organism is so complex a thing, and growth so complex a phenomenon, that for growth to be so uniform and constant in all the parts as to keep the whole shape unchanged would indeed be an unlikely and an unusual circumstance. Rates vary, proportions change, and the whole configuration alters accordingly.

Using a mass of examples, Thompson pointed out correlations between biological forms and mechanical phenomena. He showed the similarity in the forms of jellyfish and the forms of drops of liquid falling into viscous fluid, and between the internal supporting structures in the hollow bones of birds and well-known engineering truss designs. He described phyllotaxis (numerical relationships between spiral structures in plants) and its relationship to the Fibonacci sequence.

Perhaps the most famous part of the work is chapter XVII, "The Comparison of Related Forms," where Thompson explored the degree to which differences in the forms of related animals could be described by means of relatively simple mathematical transformations.

The book is a work in the "descriptive" tradition; Thompson did not articulate his insights in the form of experimental hypotheses that can be tested. He was aware of this, saying that "This book of mine has little need of preface, for indeed it is 'all preface' from beginning to end."

== Honours ==
Elected a Fellow of the Royal Society in 1916, elected an International honorary member of the American Academy of Arts and Sciences in 1928, knighted in 1937 and received the Gold Medal of the Linnean Society in 1938. In 1941, he was elected to the American Philosophical Society. He was awarded the Darwin Medal in 1946. For his revised On Growth and Form, he was awarded the Daniel Giraud Elliot Medal from the United States National Academy of Sciences in 1942. He was elected Fellow of the Royal Society of Edinburgh in 1885, and was active in the Society over many years, serving as president from 1934 to 1939.

== Legacy ==
=== Interdisciplinary influence ===
On Growth and Form has inspired thinkers including the biologists Julian Huxley, Conrad Hal Waddington and Stephen Jay Gould, the mathematicians Alan Turing and René Thom, the anthropologist Claude Lévi-Strauss and artists including Richard Hamilton, Eduardo Paolozzi, and Ben Nicholson with his ideas on the mathematical basis of the forms of animals, and perhaps especially on morphogenesis. Jackson Pollock owned a copy. Waddington and other developmental biologists were struck particularly by the chapter on Thompson's "Theory of Transformations", where he showed that the various shapes of related species (such as of fish) could be presented as geometric transformations, anticipating the evolutionary developmental biology of a century later. The book led Turing to write a famous paper "The Chemical Basis of Morphogenesis" on how patterns such as those seen on the skins of animals can emerge from a simple chemical system. Lévi-Strauss cites Thompson in his 1963 book Structural Anthropology.

On Growth and Form is seen as a classic text in architecture and is admired by architects "for its exploration of natural geometries in the dynamics of growth and physical processes." The architects and designers Le Corbusier, László Moholy-Nagy and Mies van der Rohe were inspired by the book. Peter Medawar, the 1960 Nobel Laureate in Medicine, called it "the finest work of literature in all the annals of science that have been recorded in the English tongue".

=== 150th anniversary ===
In 2010, the 150th anniversary of his birth was celebrated with events and exhibitions at the Universities of Dundee and St Andrews; the main lecture theatre in the University of Dundee's Tower Building was renamed in his honour, a publication exploring his work in Dundee and the history of his Zoology Museum was published by University of Dundee Museum Services, and an exhibition on his work was held in the city.

=== Museum and archives ===
The original Zoology Museum at Dundee became neglected after his move to St Andrews. In 1956 the building, which it was housed in, was scheduled for demolition and the museum collection was dispersed, with some parts going to the British Museum. A teaching collection was retained and forms the core of the University of Dundee's current D'Arcy Thompson Zoology Museum. In 2011, the University of Dundee was awarded a £100,000 grant by The Art Fund to build a collection of art inspired by his ideas and collections, much of it displayed in the Museum.

Special Collections at the University of St Andrews hold Thompson's personal papers which include over 30,000 items. Archive Services at the University of Dundee hold records of his time at Dundee, and a collection of papers relating to Thompson collected by Professor Alexander David Peacock, a later holder of the chair of Natural History at University College, Dundee.

In 1892 D'Arcy Thompson donated Davis Straits specimens of crustaceans, pycnogonids, and other invertebrates to the Cambridge University Museum of Zoology.

== Selected publications ==
D'Arcy Wentworth Thompson published around 300 articles and books during his career.

- 1885. A bibliography of Protozoa, sponges, Coelenterata, and worms, including also the Polyzoa, Brachiopoda, and Tunicata, for the years 1861–1883. Cambridge University Press.
- 1895. Glossary of Greek Birds. Oxford University Press.
- 1897. "Report by Professor D'Arcy Thompson on his mission to the Behring Sea in 1896." Her Majesty's Stationery Office.
- 1910. Aristotle's The History of Animals (translation).
- 1913. On Aristotle as a biologist with a prooemion on Herbert Spencer. Oxford University Press. Being the Herbert Spencer lecture delivered before the University of Oxford, 14 February 1913.
- 1917. On Growth and Form. Cambridge University Press.

— 1945 Edition at archive.org

- 1940. Science and the Classics, Oxford University Press, 264 pp.
- 1947. Glossary of Greek Fishes.

== See also ==
- Biophysics
- Evolutionary developmental biology
- Raoul Heinrich Francé (Die Pflanze als Erfinder, 1920)
