= Rachel Reid (historian) =

English historian (1876–1952)

Rachel Robertson Reid (31 January 1876 – 10 May 1952) was an English historian. Her work chiefly focused on Tudor history.

Reid was a key influence in the formation of the Historical Association in 1906, in which she acted as an honorary secretary. She remained a lifetime contributor of the association.

She published The Rebellion of the Northern Earls, 1569 in 1906, which was awarded The Alexander Prize. The essay remains a key authority in the history of the Rising of the North.

== Biography ==
Reid was born on January 31, 1876. She attained a Master of Arts degree. She received a Doctor of Letters degree from the University of London in 1911.

Reid died on May 10, 1952.

== Works ==
=== The Rebellion of the Earls, 1569 ===
Reid's essay The Rebellion of the Earls, 1569 received The Alexander Prize from the Royal Historical Society in 1906.

=== Barony and Thanage ===
Released in 1920, Reid's book Barony and Thanage examines the origins of Scottish baronies and thanages, while detailing their legal, economic and social functions during Medieval Scotland.

=== The Kings Council in the North ===
Based on her University of London D.Litt. thesis, The Kings Council in the North is a 554-page book that examines the Tudor-era Council of the North. Originally completed in May 1914, the publication of the book was postponed until 1921, due to the First World War.

=== The Planning of a History Syllabus for Schools ===
Reid co-authored the 27-page pamphlet The Planning of a History Syllabus for Schools with Stanley Toyne, which was published in 1944. The pamphlet aimed to help teachers in creating history syllabuses for schools. It was compiled with help from a committee of nine experts appointed by the Historical Association.

== Contributions to the Historical Association ==
Reid was a key influence in the creation of the Historical Association. Through teaching history at secondary schools, she realised the need for such an association; stating "I had literally no one to consult about syllabus, choice of text-books, methods, etc". She discussed this need with Miss M.A Howard, whose later proposal to history teachers and academics for such an association on 5 January 1906 led to its creation. Miss Reid was appointed an honorary secretary of the association for her role in its formation.

In 1917, she became the general editor for George Philips' elementary school oriented Junior Historical Atlas, released in 1921.

In 1944, Reid collaborated with Stanley Toyne, chair of Historical Association's Teaching of History Committee, in the creation of the Planning of a History Syllabus for Schools pamphlet. The pamphlet was compiled under the guidance of a committee of nine historical experts from the Historical Association, and guided teachers in creating effective history syllabuses for their students.
