= Elizabeth Bryson =

Elizabeth Horne Bain Bryson
- Born: Elizabeth Macdonald; 19 August 1880; Dundee
- Died: c. 1969; London
- Known for: Physician, broadcaster and prominent member of the "League of Mothers"

Elizabeth Horne Bain Bryson née Macdonald (19 August 1880, Dundee — c.1969, London) was a physician, broadcaster, and prominent member of the League of Mothers, an organisation promoting the Christian upbringing of children.

== Education and early life ==
Born in Dundee to parents of humble means, Elizabeth Macdonald was the daughter of Donald Macdonald, 'sometime cashier and poet', and Elizabeth Bain, a teacher. She graduated at the age of 19 from the University of St Andrews with a degree in English Literature with first-class honours. She was a medical student at the University College of Dundee and the Bute Medical School (now St Andrews), where she graduated MBChB in 1905, completing an MD and publishing her thesis in 1907.

== Career ==
=== Practice in New Zealand ===
As a woman, she was not offered a hospital appointment in Scotland and left for New Zealand to enter private practice as an assistant. During the First World War, she was a school medical officer. She returned to general practice in 1918, after marrying Dr Robert Bryson. (1877-1934). The couple had two children, both of whom became doctors.

Upon moving to Wellington, Elizabeth Bryson specialised in gynaecology and women's health, and 'women flocked to consult her.' Her husband supported her in this.

She was also a prominent member of the League of Mothers, promoting the Christian faith in the upbringing of children. She was considered a 'born organiser' and 'excelling in all things domestic, as a good Scots woman should' by her contemporaries.

=== Return to United Kingdom ===
Bryson returned to Britain in the 1930s and studied psychology at the Tavistock in London, applying this in her pioneering research on the psychosomatic approach in gynaecology.

== Later life ==
After her return to New Zealand in 1939 she broadcast eight radio talks on nutrition for the Health Department. After her retirement in 1953, she wrote a History of the League of Mothers in New Zealand in 1959, and later wrote her autobiography, Look Back In Wonder, in 1966. Her autobiography has been quoted by researchers on topics such as the power of the book in the lives of working people and the medical career ambitions of women of her generation. She died in London in 1969.
