= Alice Moorhead =

Scottish physician

- Born: 1868
- Died: 23 June 1910 (aged 41–42)
- Education: University of Edinburgh; Trinity College Dublin
- Known for: established the first all female medical practice in Dundee, and the Dundee Women's Hospital and Dispensary
- Medical career
- Profession: medical doctor
- Field: general practice

Dr Alice Margaret Moorhead MD LRCP LRCSE LM (Dub) (1868–23 June 1910), also known as Dr A.M. Moorhead, was one of the first practising female physicians and surgeons in Scotland. In the late 19th century she established a practice and hospital for women in Dundee with her colleague Dr Emily Thomson.

== Early life and education ==
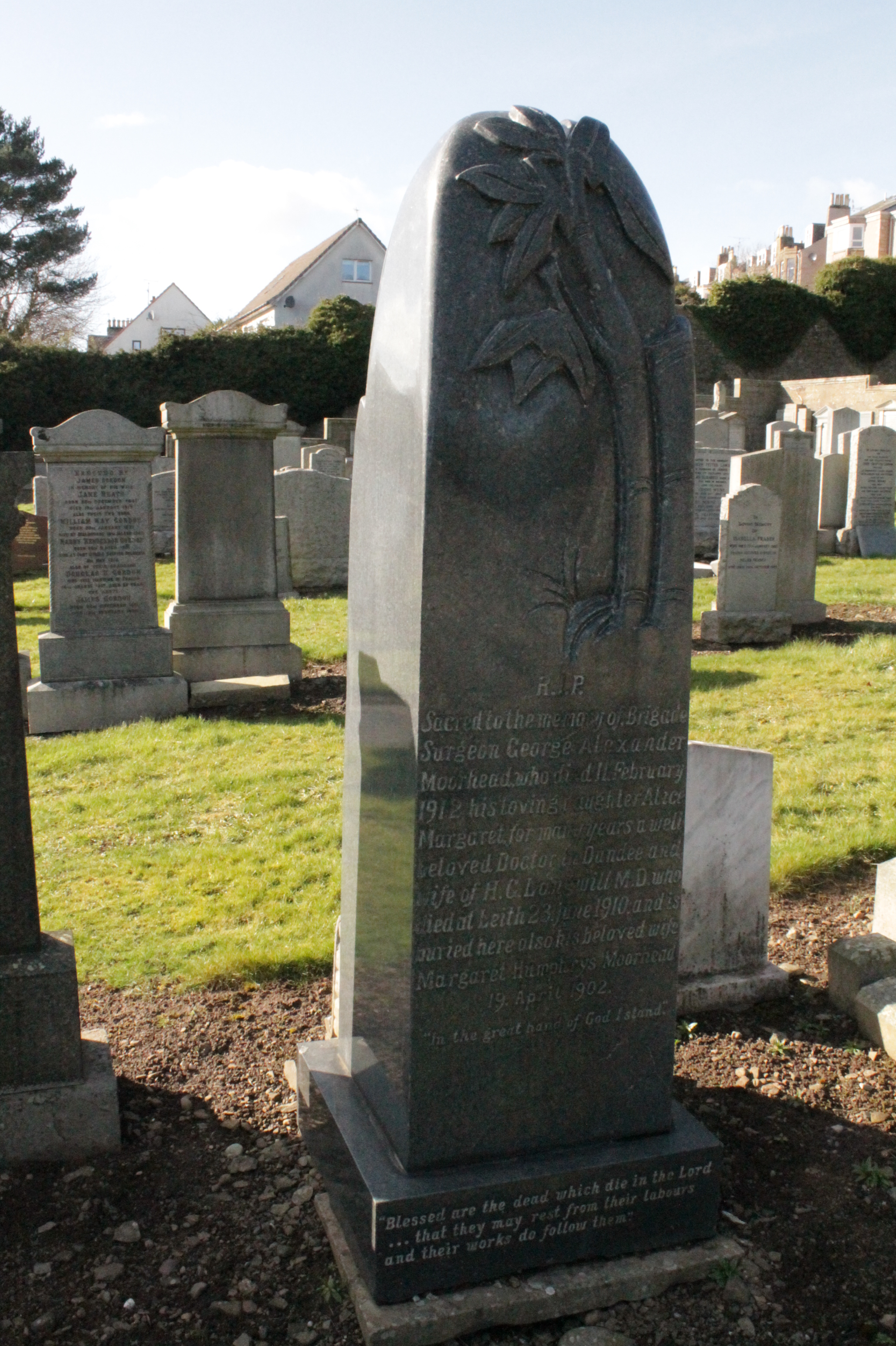
The Moorhead grave, Western Cemetery, Dundee

Moorhead was born in Maidstone the daughter of Margaret Humphrys and Brigadier Surgeon George Alexander Moorhead. She was older sister of Ethel Moorhead. She studied medicine at the University of Edinburgh, and attended the Trinity College Dublin, graduating with her doctorate (MD) in July 1890.

== Career ==
In 1894, Moorhead moved to Dundee, and with Dr Emily Thomson established the first all female practice in Scotland. Thomson treated the richer patients, while Moorhead, who had less need or desire for money, treated the poor. Their premises were originally at 93 Nethergate, where Moorhead lived. Around 1900 they moved the practice to 4 Tay Square where a plaque now commemorates them.

In 1897, Moorhead and Thomson set up the Dundee Women's Hospital and Dispensary on Seafield Road. The hospital offered all-female staff to exclusively treat female patients. The primary focus was as to be a maternity hospital, including aftercare of mother and child.

== Personal life ==
In 1908, aged 40, Moorhead married Dr Hamilton Graham Langwill, a physician at Leith Hospital, and went to live with him at 4 Hermitage Place on Leith Links.

Moorhead died in childbirth on 23 June 1910. She is buried with her parents in the Western Cemetery, Dundee. Her distinctive grave, in black polished basalt, bears a palm tree.

Her daughter Margaret Moorhead Langwill studied history at the University of Edinburgh, and became an archivist. She married F. G. Emmison.

Dundee Women's Hospital was absorbed by the National Health Service in 1948 and closed in 1975.
