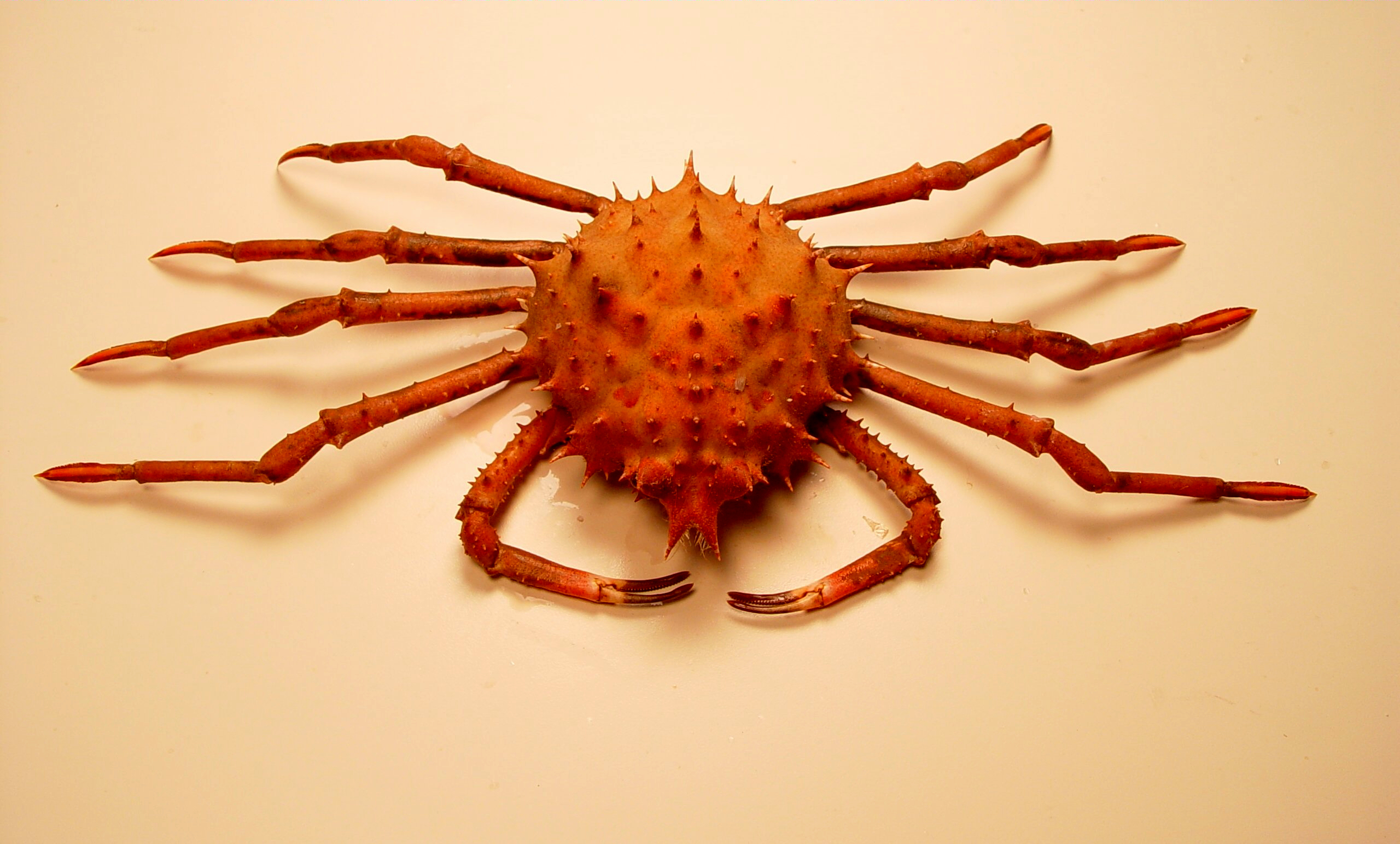
- Rochinia crassa

Scientific classification
- Kingdom: Animalia
- Phylum: Arthropoda
- Clade: Pancrustacea
- Class: Malacostraca
- Order: Decapoda
- Suborder: Pleocyemata
- Infraorder: Brachyura
- Family: Epialtidae
- Genus: Rochinia; A. Milne-Edwards, 1875

= Rochinia =

Genus of crabs

Rochinia is a genus of crab in the family Epialtidae, containing the following species:

- Rochinia ahyongi McLay, 2009
- Rochinia annae Richer de Forges & Poore, 2008
- Rochinia beauchampi (Alcock & Anderson, 1894)
- Rochinia brevirostris (Doflein, 1904)
- Rochinia carpenteri (Thomson, 1873)
- Rochinia confusa Tavares, 1991
- Rochinia cornuta (Rathbun, 1898)
- Rochinia crassa (A. Milne-Edwards, 1879)
- Rochinia crosnieri Griffin & Tranter, 1986
- Rochinia daiyuae Takeda & Komatsu, 2005
- Rochinia debilis Rathbun, 1932
- Rochinia decipiata Williams & Eldredge, 1994
- Rochinia fultoni (Grant, 1905)
- Rochinia galathea Griffin & Tranter, 1986
- Rochinia globulifera (Wood-Mason & Alcock, 1891)
- Rochinia gracilipes A. Milne-Edwards, 1875
- Rochinia griffini Davie & Short, 1989
- Rochinia hertwigi (Doflein, 1904)
- Rochinia hystrix (Stimpson, 1871)
- Rochinia kotakae Takeda, 2001
- Rochinia makassar Griffin & Tranter, 1986
- Rochinia moluccensis Griffin & Tranter, 1986
- Rochinia mosaica (Whitelegge, 1900)
- Rochinia natalensis Kensley, 1977
- Rochinia occidentalis (Faxon, 1893)
- Rochinia paulayi Ng & Richer de Forges, 2007
- Rochinia planirostris Takeda, 2009
- Rochinia pulchra (Miers, 1886)
- Rochinia rissoana (Roux, 1828)
- Rochinia riversandersoni (Alcock, 1895)
- Rochinia sibogae Griffin & Tranter, 1986
- Rochinia soela Griffin & Tranter, 1986
- Rochinia strangeri Serène & Lohavanijaya, 1973
- Rochinia suluensis Griffin & Tranter, 1986
- Rochinia tanneri (Smith, 1883)
- Rochinia tomentosa Griffin & Tranter, 1986
- Rochinia umbonata (Stimpson, 1871)
- Rochinia vesicularis (Rathbun, 1907)
