= Mary Lily Walker =

Scottish social reformer (1863-1913)

- Born: 5 July 1863; Dundee
- Died: July 1, 1913 (aged 49)
- Known for: Scottish social reformer

Mary Lily Walker (5 July 1863 – 1 July 1913) was a Scottish social reformer, who worked to improve conditions for women and children working in industrial Dundee.

== Early life and university ==
Mary Lily Walker was born at 152 Perth Road, Dundee on 5 July 1863 to Mary Allen and Thomas Walker. Her father was a solicitor and died when she was young. Walker excelled academically from a young age, first being educated at Tayside House, before completing her schooling at the High School of Dundee between 1880 and 1881. During her time there, she won prizes in French, German, Perspective and Practical Geometry.

After finishing her studies at the High School, she attended University College Dundee upon its inception in 1883 following her mother's death. Walker continued to study there for 11 years, studying under professors such as D'Arcy Wentworth Thompson (with whom she developed a close friendship and corresponded continuously throughout her life), Alfred Ewing, John Steggall and Patrick Geddes. She continued to flourish, winning prizes at the university in Classics, Ancient History, Senior Latin, Literature, Botany, Embryology, Zoology, Physiology, Chemistry, and History. During her time there she also had two papers published on avian anatomy.

Walker's interest in social reform was initiated upon joining the Dundee Social Union (DSU), a group formed in 1888 by a group of the university's professors to improve the quality of life of Dundee's poor, particularly housing and health. Initially she worked as a rent collector, engaging closely with the families who lived in properties owned by the group. In 1891, she was appointed Superintendent of Housing and Chief Manager of properties. During her time in this role, she started to work more elements of social work into her role, starting clubs for the working women, for example.

== London ==
In 1893, Walker travelled to London, working directly under the social reformer Octavia Hill at the Women's University Settlement in Southwark. Walker returned to Dundee and focused further on improving the lives of the city's poor through her work with the DSU, despite being offered wardenship of a new settlement by Octavia Hill. Walker adapted what she had learned in London under Hill's tutelage to fit Dundee's particular poverty concerns. By 1905, 40,000 people were employed in the textiles industry in the city; over three-quarters of these were women, and untold numbers children. It was from her work in Southwark that she came into contact with other influential luminaries of the time such as Charles Booth and Seebohm Rowntree.

After the death of her close friend Madge Oliphant Valentine (niece of author Margaret Oliphant), Walker travelled to London again. From May 1898 she spent a year living and working with the Grey Ladies, a Church of England religious order based in Blackheath, formally known as the College of Women Workers. There she trained in social work, with a view to bringing her experience back to Dundee. It was also at this time that Walker started wearing the grey habit of the order, clothing that she would wear for most of the rest of her life, and which she can be seen wearing in the only known photograph in existence of her.

== Return to Dundee and the D.S.U. ==
In 1899, Walker returned to Dundee and resumed work with the Dundee Social Union (DSU). With high-profile speakers lecturing at the group's events, and wider activities in Dundee, membership rose from 61 members in 1899 to 168 by 1905. Walker encouraged the group to move towards the use of more professional workers rather than relying on employees. To this end she persuaded the DSU to train workers in her house, Grey Lodge Settlement, on the basis that she would fund training for one worker if the group funded two themselves.

In 1901 Walker was elected as a parish councillor, alongside Agnes Husband, and in 1905 was appointed to the Distress Committee which dealt with poor relief.

The DSU produced reports factual on social conditions in Dundee, which were published by local politician and newspaper proprietor John Leng. Walker and her professional colleague Mona Wilson undertook the data gathering arrangements on behalf of the DSU's Social Enquiry Committee for these publications. The reports dealt with housing conditions, household income and expenditure, women's paid work, infant mortality and child health. Part one was an investigation based on the medical inspection of school children in School Board Schools which includes detailed tables (e.g., weights, heights, diseases and eyes). A second report dealt with housing and industrial conditions and the unusual circumstances in a city dominated by the jute industry which employed mainly women and children.

Infant mortality was recognised as a problem in Dundee and, under Walker's guidance, DSU opened a restaurant for working mothers in the West Port in 1906. Mothers were supplied with nourishing meals and advice for the first three months of their child's life, providing they breast-fed their infants and stayed away from work. This successful initiative was taken over by the city corporation under the Medical Officer of Health Dr Charles Templeman leading to further restaurants and infant health clinics.

In 1913 Walker provided a statement on housing conditions in Dundee for the Ballantyne-led Royal Commission on housing in Scotland.

== Death ==
Mary Lily Walker died on the morning of 1 July 1913, in her bed in Grey Lodge, Dundee. Shortly before her death, she was attended by her doctor, Julia F. Pringle, who worked at the Dundee Infants Hospital and Blackscroft Baby Clinic. The death was registered by her close friend Guilmera Peterson, younger sister of Meta Peterson, her lifelong friend.

A funeral was held two days later on 3 July 1913, at St Paul's Cathedral, Dundee, which Walker had attended. The horse-drawn cortege was accompanied by a large number of people from different walks of life, 'in one of the largest funerals seen in Dundee for a considerable time' as described in The Courier. The procession left the town centre and continued on through Dundee to Balgay Cemetery, where Mary Lily Walker was interred in a grave topped with a Celtic cross, which still stands there. She is buried next to her stepsister Grace, her brother Arthur Thomas John, and her mother Mary Anne Allen.

== Commemoration ==
Walker has been remembered with a plaque on Walker House at Grey Lodge Settlement, South George Street, Dundee, as part of the Dundee Women's Trail. Grey Lodge Settlement is a registered Scottish charity and carries on the work Walker started; the association's minutes are held by Dundee City Archives. Walker's birthplace on Perth Road, Dundee, was also marked with a plaque in 2016. To mark the 100th anniversary of her death a four-day celebration of her life and legacy was held in the city. The High School of Dundee named its new purpose-built nursery the Mary Lily Walker building after their former pupil in 2014.

One of Dundee’s hostels for people experiencing homelessness, the Lily Walker Centre in the city’s Ann Street, is named after Mary Lily Walker.
