= Historical Association =

UK-based academic society for history

The Historical Association is a membership organisation of historians and scholars founded in 1906 and based in London. Its goals are to support "the study and enjoyment of history at all levels by creating an environment that promotes lifelong learning and provides for the evolving needs of people who share an interest in history." The association's patron was Queen Elizabeth II; since 2024, it has been King Charles III.

The Historical Association was incorporated by royal charter in 2006, its centenary year. Legally it is a charity registered in England. The need for a national historical association was first put forth by Rachel Reid to M.A. Howard, who subsequently made the first public proposal for the association's formation on 5 January 1906. The formation was enacted on 19 May 1906 by university academics, especially Charles Firth, Albert Pollard, and Thomas Tout. At first the organisation dealt chiefly with teaching problems. The membership was expanded to include laymen, and the association branched out into activities such as publication and research in local history.

== Activities ==
The Historical Association is active in supporting the study and teaching of history at all levels. Membership is around 6,000, largely UK-based, with a strong following in UK secondary school history departments.

The association has 58 branches through the UK which run a variety of events ranging from historical talks to walks and visits. Branch associate members take the overall membership to about 8,000. Some branches have also undertaken their own publication programmes. For instance, the Bristol branch published 120 pamphlets on aspects of Bristol's history from 1960-2007, written mostly by academics at the University of Bristol and the University of the West of England. These pamphlets have since been published electronically on the Internet Archive.

The association campaigns on their behalf and to ensure history continues to be taught well at all phases of education. The association is committed to a policy of embracing a broad church and encouraging a general interest in history and in our cultural heritage.

It has published a journal for professional historians titled History since 1912. Its Annual Bulletin of Historical Literature provides reviews of the years historical books and journal articles. It also publishes Primary History, materials for teachers of teachers involved in primary education, and a journal called Teaching History for secondary school history teachers, as well as The Historian for a wider readership.

The association aims to provide the best possible resources and support for history teachers in the United Kingdom, as well as providing online continuing professional development courses.

== History ==
On 5 January 1906, a group of history teachers and academics met in London to discuss the proposal from Miss M. A. Howard that they establish "an association to co-ordinate the efforts of all those working in England towards the improvement of history teaching in our schools." The aims Miss Howard identified for such an association were to be:

- A place for history teachers to get advice on syllabus, textbooks and method
- A means of keeping teachers in school in touch with the work of the universities
- A body to bring pressure to bear on educational authorities and examining bodies
- A body to persuade publishers to bring out cheap editions of good books and illustrations for use in schools

The meeting agreed to act upon Miss Howard's proposal, and in closing the meeting Professor Pollard gave a wider remit for the new association: that history should be properly recognised by universities and that history should be properly taught in our schools.

This became the spark that formally founded the Historical Association on 19 May 1906. The first published aims were:

- The collection of information as to existing systems of historical teaching at home and abroad, by getting together printed books, pamphlets and other materials, and by correspondence
- The distribution of information amongst the members of the association as to methods of teaching and aids to teaching (viz. maps, illustrations, text books, etc.)
- The encouragement of local centres for the discussion of questions relative to the study and teaching of history
- The representation on the needs and interests of the study of history and of the opinion of its teachers to governing bodies, government departments, and other authorities having control over education
- Co-operation for common objects with the English Association, the Geographical Association, the Modern Language Association and the Classical Association.

The association's aims have remained substantially unchanged and the aims stated in the Historical Association's Charter closely echo these sentiments.

By 1917 the constitution was changed to incorporate non-professional interest in the subject. Admission was "open to all persons interested in the study and teaching of history". The association quickly grew in the post-war years and by the early 1950s had over 70 active branches and more than 8,000 members.

An early emphasis on the national and imperial past was coupled from 1919 with a growing interest in presenting Britain's relationship to other European nations. Since 1945 there has been less emphasis on the origins of contemporary politics.

In 2010, the association expressed concerns over the reduction in history education in schools.

== See also ==
- Medlicott Medal
- British Association for Local History
- Royal Historical Society
- Historiography of the United Kingdom
