= Florence Gertrude de Fonblanque =

Florence de Fonblanque
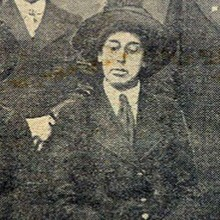
- from a 1916 newspaper
- Born: Florence Gertrude Sparagnapane; 22 July 1864; London, England
- Died: 2 January 1949 (aged 84); Duncton, England
- Organization: Conservative and Unionist Women's Franchise Association
- Known for: organising the "Brown Women" to march from Edinburgh to London
- Spouse: Robert Edgar De Grenier de Fonblanque
- Relatives: Maud Arncliffe Sennett (sister)

Florence Gertrude de Fonblanque (née Sparagnapane; 22 July 1864 – 2 January 1949) was a British suffragist. She was a main organiser of the 1912 women's suffrage march from Edinburgh to London.

== Life ==
Fonblanque was born in London to a family who owned the Sparagnapane Christmas cracker and confectionery business. Her mother was Aurelia Williams and her father was Gaudente Sparagnapane. She was taught in Brussels and at Brighton and like her elder sister, Maud Arncliffe Sennett, she became an actress. She married a fellow actor, Robert Edgar de Grenier de Fonblanque, when she claimed to be 21 but she was actually 26. Her husband bore the titles "marquis of Juliers", "count of Hauteserre", and "count of Fonblanque". However, despite his family descending from a noble French family, these were false titles of nobility, first mistakenly mentioned by Edward Barrington de Fonblanque in an 1874 book. (Note: About the title "comte de Fonblanque" marquis de Ruvigny wrote in his book The nobilities of Europe (1909), in an entry about DE GRENIER DE FONBLANQUE : "John Martin de Fonblanque, de jure Comte de Fonblanque (...) In the Life of Albany Fonblanque by his nephew (p. 2) (1874), it is further stated that Pierre de Grenier, having defended the castle of Cessenan against the Duke of Montmorency in 1584, his sons received from Henry IV the titles of Count de Hauteserre and de Fonblanque from two fiefs in the Foret de la Gresine, near Bruniquet, and that the elder branch of the family became extinct on the death of Cesar de Grenier, Marquis de Juliers, in 1829. A visitation pedigree of these Greniers appears in Pieces fugitives, pour servir à I'Histoire de France, &c., collected and edited by [C. de Baschi] Marquess of Aubois (3 vols., Paris, 1759), ii. 148, but no mention appears there of their being Lords or Counts of Hauteserre or Fonblanque. La Chenaye des Bois (Dict, de la Noblesse, viii. 988), however, gives the pedigree of a family of Garnier, descended from Balthazar de Garnier, Premier Consul of Toulon 1469, whose great-great- grandson was father of two sons (1) Balthazar, ancestor of the Garniers, Seigneurs de Julhians, and (2) Jean, ancestor of the Garniers, Seigneurs de Fonblanque; and the Editor cannot help thinking that a mistake has been made in attaching this family to the Greniers of Rainsins, rather than to the Garniers of Julhians and Fonblanque.)

Like her sister she took an interest in women's suffrage. In 1906 she was living in Duncton near Chichester and over the next few years she joined a number of organisations agitating for women to have the vote.

In 1912 she was a member of the Conservative and Unionist Women's Franchise Association.

== The March ==
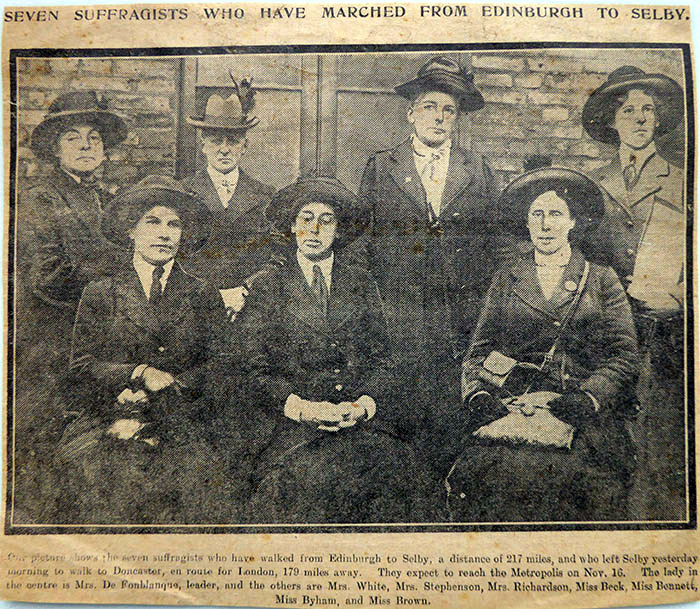
The seven who reached Selby

Fonblanque decided to mount a march from Edinburgh to London to draw attention to the women's suffrage cause. She initially thought that walking to Edinburgh would be a good idea but it was decided to march from Edinburgh so that the march could end its publicity in London. Only six women including Agnes Brown and Sarah Benett, who was the Treasurer of the Women's Freedom League set off on 21 October 1912. Fonblanque's sister and Ruth Cavendish Bentinck helped with the organisation. As they and Fonblanque traveled from Scotland to London they gathered signatures on a petition and coverage in the newspapers. Fonblanque ensure that they were dressed in brown with rosettes and bright green cockades and they were known as the "Brown Women". They followed the route of the A1 and they were joined by dignitaries along the way. On one day near Berwick they walked over 30 miles before the now seven marchers were welcomed by the local member of parliament. Their numbers swelled slowly - when they passed through Grantham in November there were twelve walkers including Fonblanque.

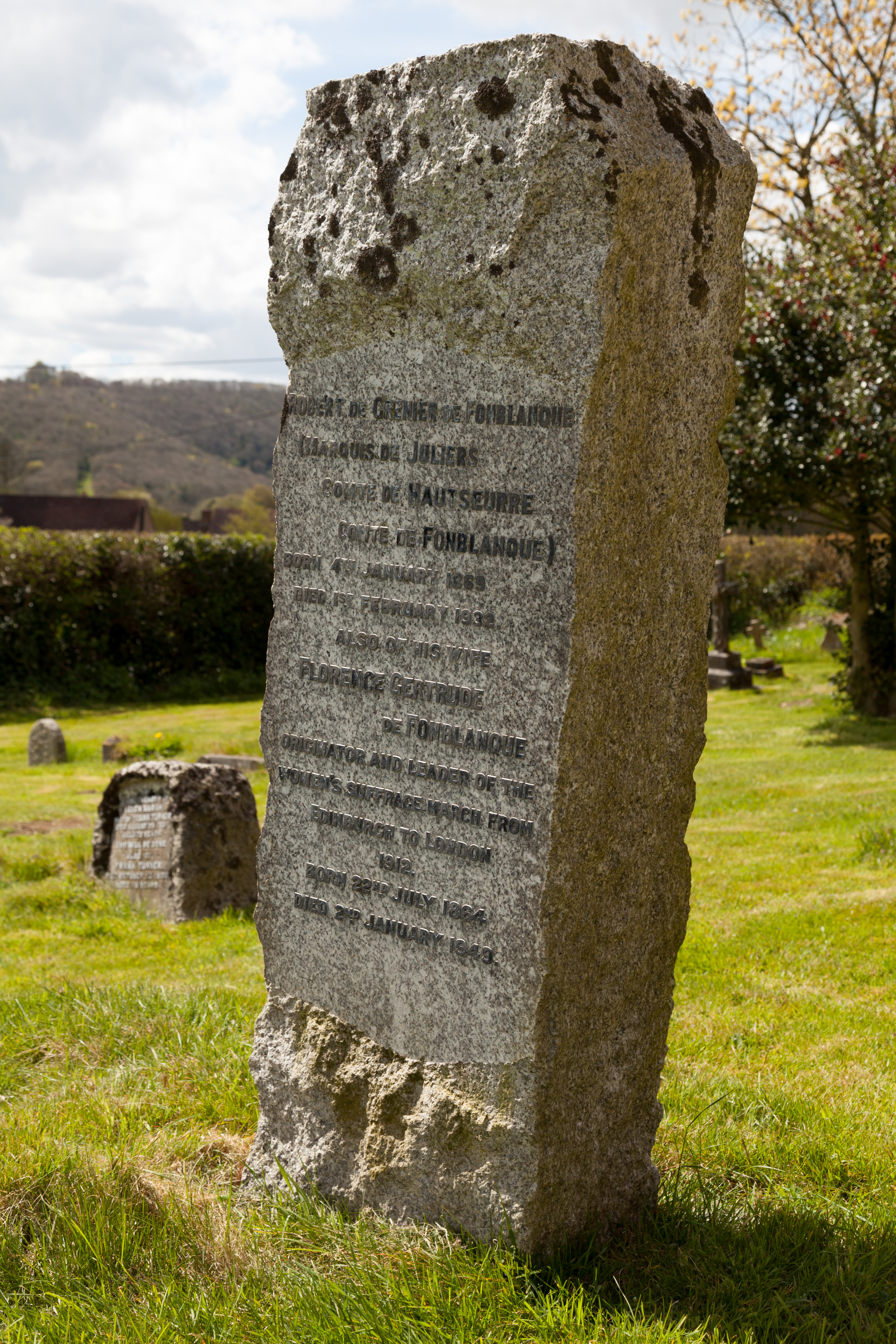
Grave of Florence Gertrude de Fonblanque in Duncton

Finally they got to London on 16 November 1912, where Fonblanque's horse and cart were sent back to Scotland. They went by tube to Trafalgar Square where the walkers entered to music. Her sister Maud Arncliffe Sennett had assisted the march by organising a reception for the marchers when they arrived. Sennett was helped with the welcome by the National Political League started by Mary Adelaide Broadhurst and Margaret Milne Farquharson. Sennett takes credit for the walk in one source. Fonblanque was described a year later as 'organiser of the Woman's March from Edinburgh to London' in The Vote, the Women's Freedom League newspaper, describing her as guest speaker on 'Nature and the Soul of Woman's Suffrage.' Further hikes happened in the U.K.

The month after the Edinburgh to London march Rosalie Gardiner Jones had organized the first American Suffrage Hike which left from The Bronx to Albany, New York.

There were reports that Fonblanque and Ruth Cavendish Bentinck had founded an organisation of non aligned suffragists in 1913. The Qui Vive Corps would wear the brown, green and white uniform described above. It was intended that these would attend any suffrage inspired event. The Qui Vive Corps were involved in campaigning for the Labour Party in Derbyshire and Staffordshire because they objected to the Liberal Party's policy which was against women getting the vote.

== Death and legacy ==
Fonblanque died at her home in Duncton in 1949. She was buried in the churchyard of Holy Trinity Anglican church and she had "Originator and leader of the women's suffrage march from Edinburgh to London 1912" carved on her gravestone at her request.
