= Maud Arncliffe-Sennett =

English actress and suffragist (1862–1936)

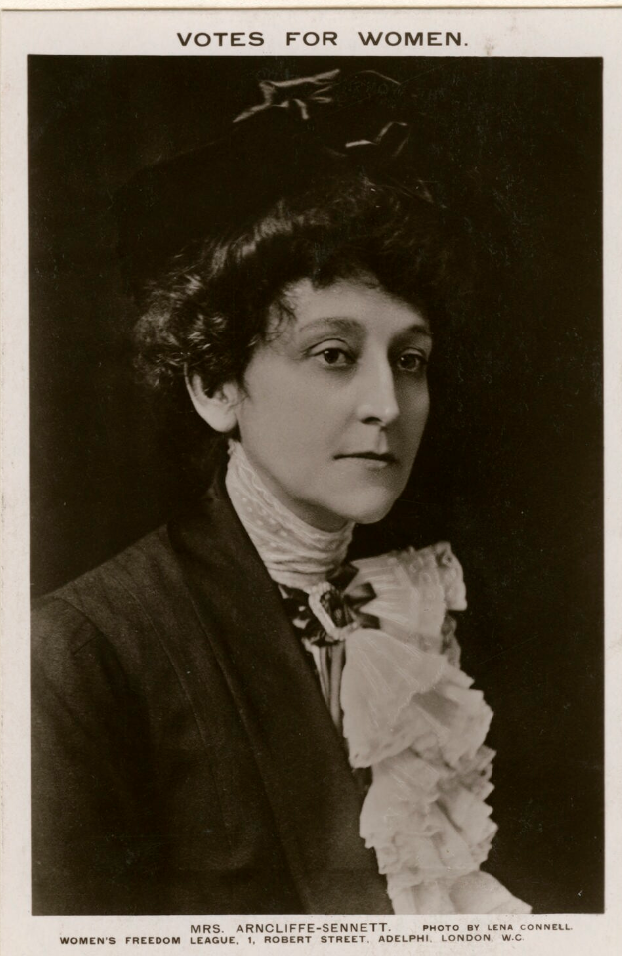
- by Lena Connell for Women's Freedom League
- Born: Alice Maud Mary Sparagnapane; 4 February 1862; London, England
- Died: 15 September 1936 (aged 74); Midhurst, Sussex, England
- Occupations: Actress and activist
- Spouse: Henry Robert Arncliffe-Sennett

Alice Maud Arncliffe-Sennett also known with the stage name of Mary Kingsley (born Alice Maud Mary Sparagnapane; 4 February 1862 – 15 September 1936) was an English actress and suffragist and a suffragette, arrested four times for her activism.

== Early life ==
Arncliffe-Sennett was born as Alice Maud Mary Sparagnapane in London to a family who owned a Christmas cracker and confectionery business. Her mother was Amelia Williams and her father was Gaudente Sparagnapane. Arncliffe-Sennett became an actress taking the name Mary Kingsley, and her performance as Lady Macbeth was given high praise in the press, and her performance as Joan of Arc at the Shakespeare Commemoration of 1889, led to a portrait of her in character being painted and hung in the Shakespeare Memorial at Stratford-upon-Avon. Her acting career included touring mainland Britain and she also spent a year in Australia. Her confidence with public speaking would be a skill she would use again, 'high elocutionary powers'.

Maud married in 1898 and she and her husband, Henry Robert Arncliffe-Sennett, took over the family business. Henry was also an actor, in supporting roles to Beerbohm Tree and others.

== Activism ==
In 1906, Arncliffe-Sennett read an article by Millicent Fawcett and this led to her to join the London Society for Women's Suffrage, which helped organise the 'mud march' of February 1907, and her company provided 7,000 red and white rosettes. Arncliffe-Sennett joined a number of other suffrage societies and she served on the executive committees of the Women's Freedom League, the Actresses' Franchise League (AFL) and the militant Women's Social and Political Union (WSPU)'s branch in Hampstead.

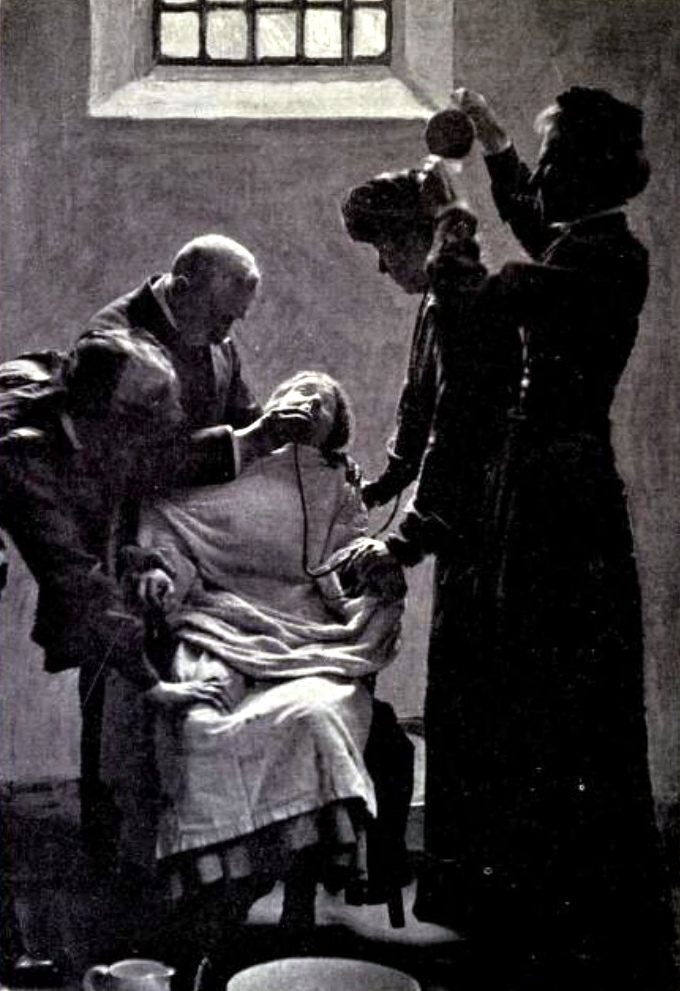
force feeding of suffragettes

Arncliffe-Sennett hosted events for the cause and wrote to the press that her opinion and desire not to condemn militancy in the campaign for women's right to vote must be published as prominently as a letter about one debate from suffragist leader Millicent Fawcett. She also wrote correcting a press report of an incident when she had spoken up in a meeting in Leamington against the Anti-Suffrage League President Lady Jersey. Arncliffe-Sennett strongly condemned force-feeding of hunger-striking suffragettes, including Ada Wright, and was writing to the Daily Herald that it was:

so revolting as to make one ashamed of one's nationality. To so degrade the bodies of British women, as is still being done under British rule, is to make the name of Briton (sic) "stink in the nostrils of humanity." The wonder is that Britain stands it!"

Arncliffe-Sennett also wrote in 1910,

I am an employee of male labour, and the men who earn their living through the power of my poor brain, the men whose children I pay to educate, whose members of Parliament I pay for, and to whose old-age pensions I contribute – these are allowed a vote, while I am voteless.

Her sister, Florence Gertrude de Fonblanque decided it was a good idea to mount a march from Edinburgh to London. Only six women set off but as they travelled from Scotland to London they gathered others and a large interest from the media. Arncliffe-Sennett assisted the march by organising a reception for her sisters and the other marchers when they arrived. Arncliffe-Sennett was assisted with the welcome by the National Political League founded by Mary Adelaide Broadhurst and Margaret Milne Farquharson.

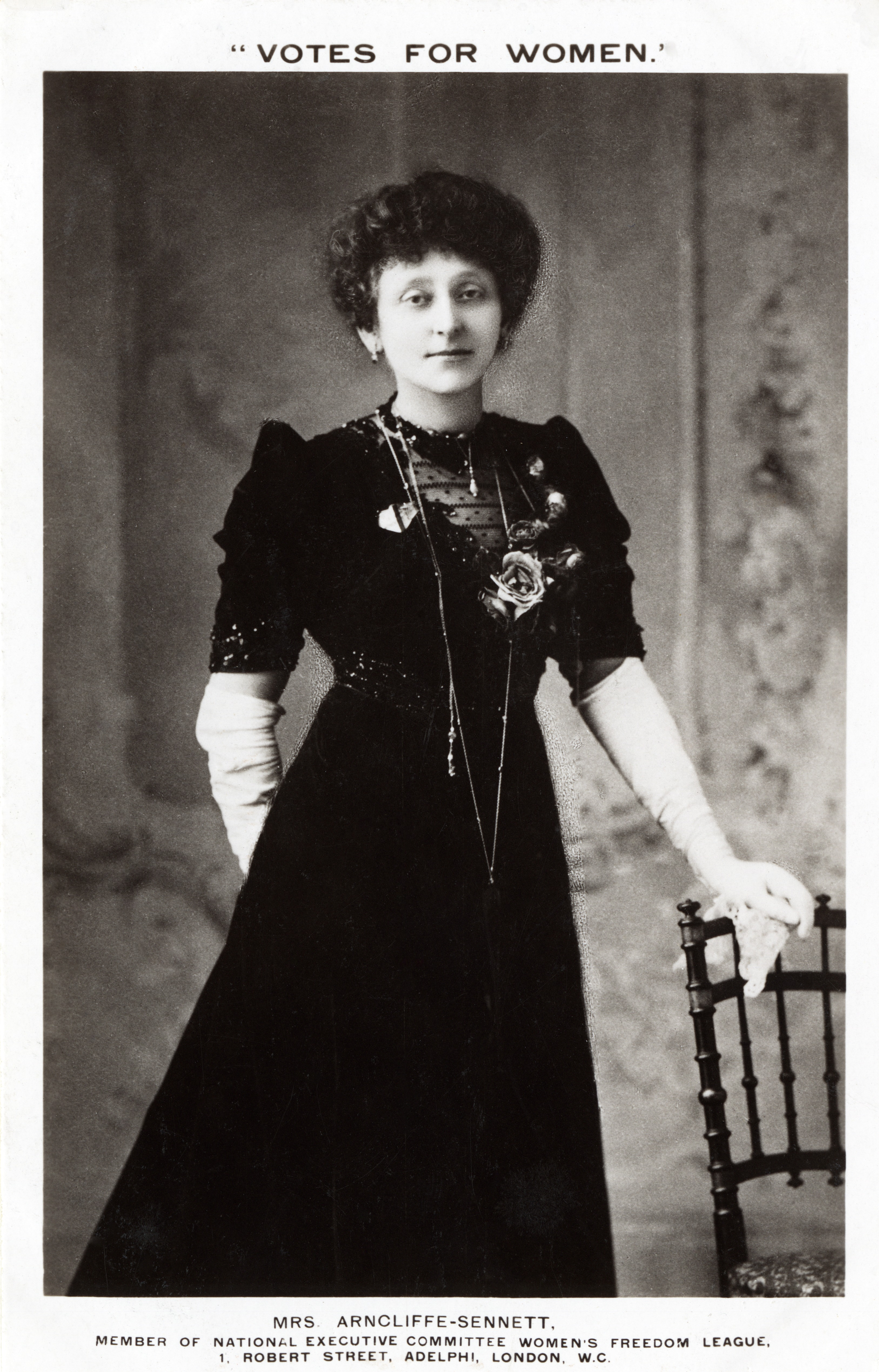
Arncliffe-Sennett, "Votes for Women"

In 1910, Sennet led a deputation to Downing Street to address Asquith and Lloyd-George, which resulted in the 'Black Friday' incidents of police violence against the women protestors. And in 1911, Arncliffe-Sennett broke windows of the offices of the Daily Mail for not reporting a WSPU rally, her imprisonment was a few days (the newspaper editor paid her fine). In 1913 she realised that men as well as women might have an interest in getting women the vote after she met a Scottish businessman named Alexander Orr. She founded the Northern Men's League for Women's Suffrage (NMLFWS) after the death of Emily Davison. She had attended her funeral on behalf of the Actresses Franchise League and decided to take the same train as Emily's coffin. As she went north she met Orr and they realised that the public sympathy would lead to many men with some influence joining a suffrage organisation. She was at the centre of the organisation and she called the members "her bairns" and she intended to use their influence to petition the Prime Minister. A verse was written by artist John Wilson McLaren

We've come from the North, and the heather's on fire,

To fight for the women–our only desire;

At last we've been roused thro' the treachery shown

By knaves at Westminster–the knaves we disown!'

However the Prime Minister refused to see them.

Arncliffe-Sennett and the Women's Freedom League came into conflict with Emmeline and Christabel Pankhurst when the First World War started. Emmeline and Christabel negotiated with the government and agreed to stop all political activities and to organise a pro-war demonstration. In exchange they were given freedom of all the prisoners and £2,000 towards costs. All of the prisoners released were told that their new role was to work for the war effort. Arncliffe-Sennett objected to this approach and gave money to Sylvia Pankhurst who took a similar line. Arncliffe-Sennett became vice president of the United Suffragists set up by the Pethick-Lawrences in 1914.

Arncliffe-Sennett's support was strong and focused. She spent a lot of time in London and decided to resign in 1916 as President of the NMLFWS but the membership would not accept it. She was persuaded to stay in post. The organisation continued until 1919. Once (certain) women had achieved the vote in 1918 under the Representation of the People Act 1918, Arncliffe-Sennett was offered a safe seat in Edinburgh as an MP. She refused but was the first woman in Britain to be asked to stand for parliament.

== Later years ==
Later in life Arncliffe-Sennett was very active in the cause of animal rights, founding and directing the Midhurst and Haslemere Anti-Vivisection Society. Arncliffe-Sennett also kept several scrapbooks of suffrage memorabilia which she donated to the British Library.

Arncliffe-Sennett died from tuberculosis, in Midhurst, Sussex, in 1936.

Her husband arranged for her autobiography 'The Child' to be published posthumously in 1938. He married again. When her sister, Florence, died in 1949 she had carved on her gravestone, as requested "Originator and leader of the women's suffrage march from Edinburgh to London 1912".

== Works ==
- Manifesto on Venereal Disease (1916)
- The Child (1938)
