= Agnes Brown (suffragist) =

Scottish suffragist and writer

Agnes Henderson Brown
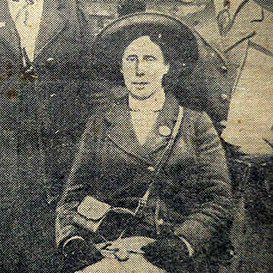
- 1916 newspaper cutting
- Born: 12 April 1866; Edinburgh, Scotland, United Kingdom of Great Britain and Ireland
- Died: 1 December 1943 (aged 77); Edinburgh, Scotland, United Kingdom
- Other name: Nannie

Agnes Henderson Brown also known as Nannie Brown (12 April 1866 – 1 December 1943) was a Scottish suffragist and writer. She was one of the "Brown Women" who walked from Edinburgh to London in 1912. An early woman cyclist in Scotland. She repeated the walk but this time from John O Groats. She was a founding member of the Scottish Women's Rural Institute.

== Life ==
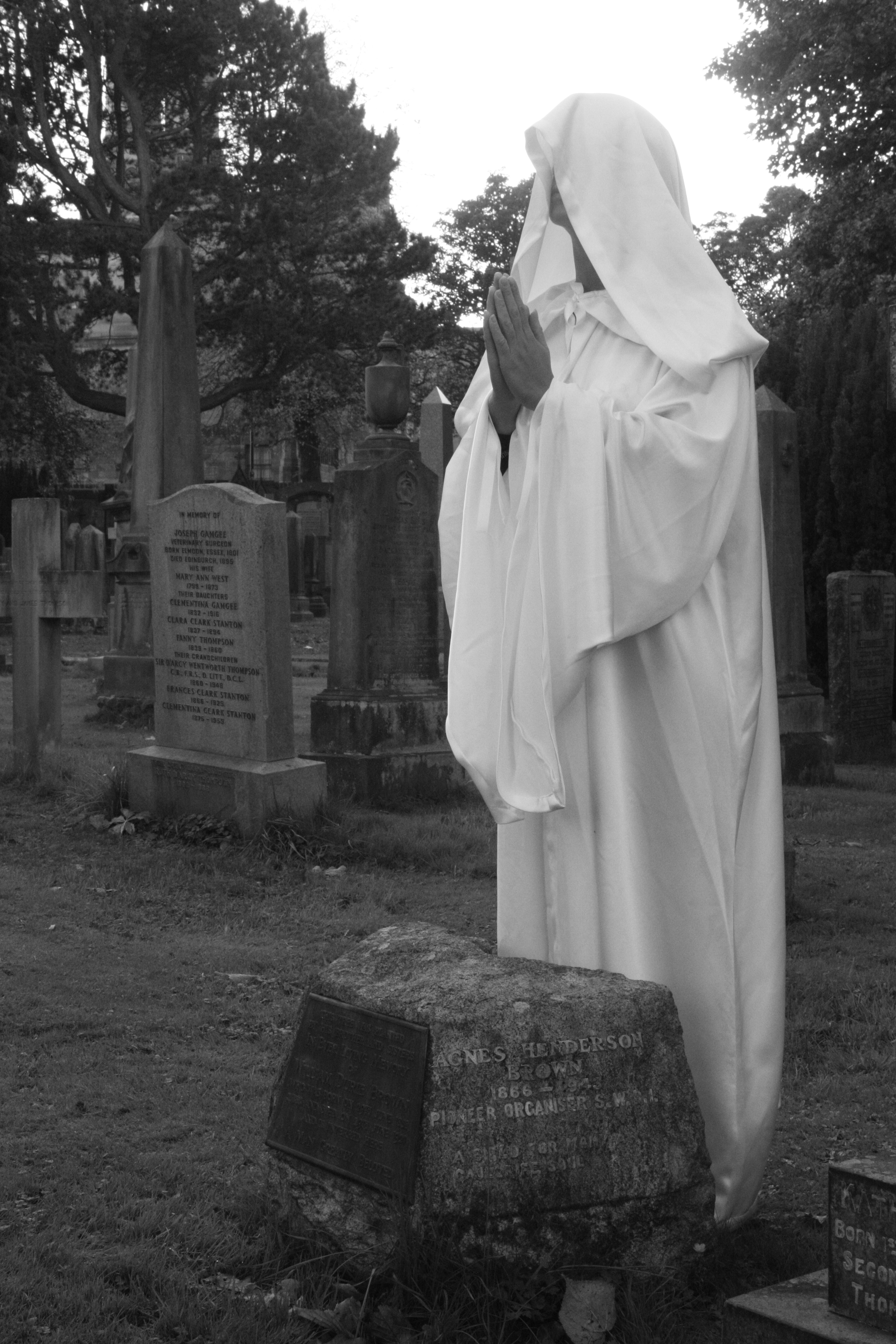
Veneration of the grave of Agnes Brown, Dean Cemetery

Brown was born in Edinburgh in 1866 to William ("Durie") Brown (1858–1921) and his wife Jessie Wishart Henderson. The family lived at 125 Princes Street facing Edinburgh Castle. Her father was an activist for women's rights. His opposition to taxes that differentiated between genders caused him to end up in Calton Gaol. Her father ran a number of fruit shops under the title of William Brown & Sons but he trained his daughters, Agnes and Jessie, well and refused to submit to laws that he objected to. He wrote a book about his experiences.

Brown was an activist for the Women's Freedom League which was a suffrage organisation created in 1907 in reply to the Pankhursts' autocracy. She volunteered to be one of the "Brown Women", which were not named after her but after the brown coats that the walkers wore. It was Florence Gertrude de Fonblanque's idea and she, Brown and four others including Sarah Benett set off from Edinburgh in 1912 to walk to London. They had white scarves and green hats and as they travelled they gathered signatures for a petition for women's rights. The hikers had to walk fifteen miles and attend a meeting each day and in this way they took five weeks to get to London. They followed the route of the A6 and they were joined by others along the way. On one day near Berwick they walked over 30 miles before being welcomed by the local member of parliament. Finally they got to London on 16 November where their horse and cart was sent back to Scotland. They went by tube to Trafalgar Square where the walkers entered to music. Rosalie Gardiner Jones was a supporter of the “Pankhursts,”. She organised walks in America that were similar to the "Brown Women" walks. One of Jones Suffrage Hikes include the hike to Albany, New York in December 1912.

With a father who had been a de facto political prisoner she supported the idea that men could be members of the Women's Freedom League. In 1913 a group of professional men failed to get a meeting with Asquith to discuss extending votes to women. That group formed the Northern Men's Federation for Women's Suffrage and Agnes volunteered to be their secretary.

In 1917 she became an area organiser at the first meeting of the Scottish Women's Rural Institutes as they assisted Scottish agriculture but in time they were cut out of the organisation by the Scottish board of agriculture. In 1918 she was one of the founding members of the Edinburgh Women Citizens Association which was one of many WCAs that were formed across the country to educate new women voters. Other members were Sarah Siddons, Lillias Tait Mitchell, Agnes Syme Macdonald and Alexi Buttar Jack.

Brown wrote articles, plays and stories; a number of the latter, such as "The Stockin'" were dramatised by Elizabeth Finlayson Gauld. She also participated in societies such as the Edinburgh Dickens Fellowship, learned to type and ride a bicycle. She continued to walk. Not content with the Brown Women walk she repeated a similar walk but this time she set off from John O Groats. As she travelled to London she reported on her journey in the Weekly Scotsman.

Brown died on 1 December 1943 and was buried with her parents in Dean Cemetery in western Edinburgh in 1943. The small (and vandalised) grave lies in one of the central sections and is highly obscured by larger graves in front. She was noted in the Scottish Saltire Society who published her obituary as an Outstanding Women of Scotland Community in 2014–15.
