= Vera Douie =

British librarian and women's rights campaigner

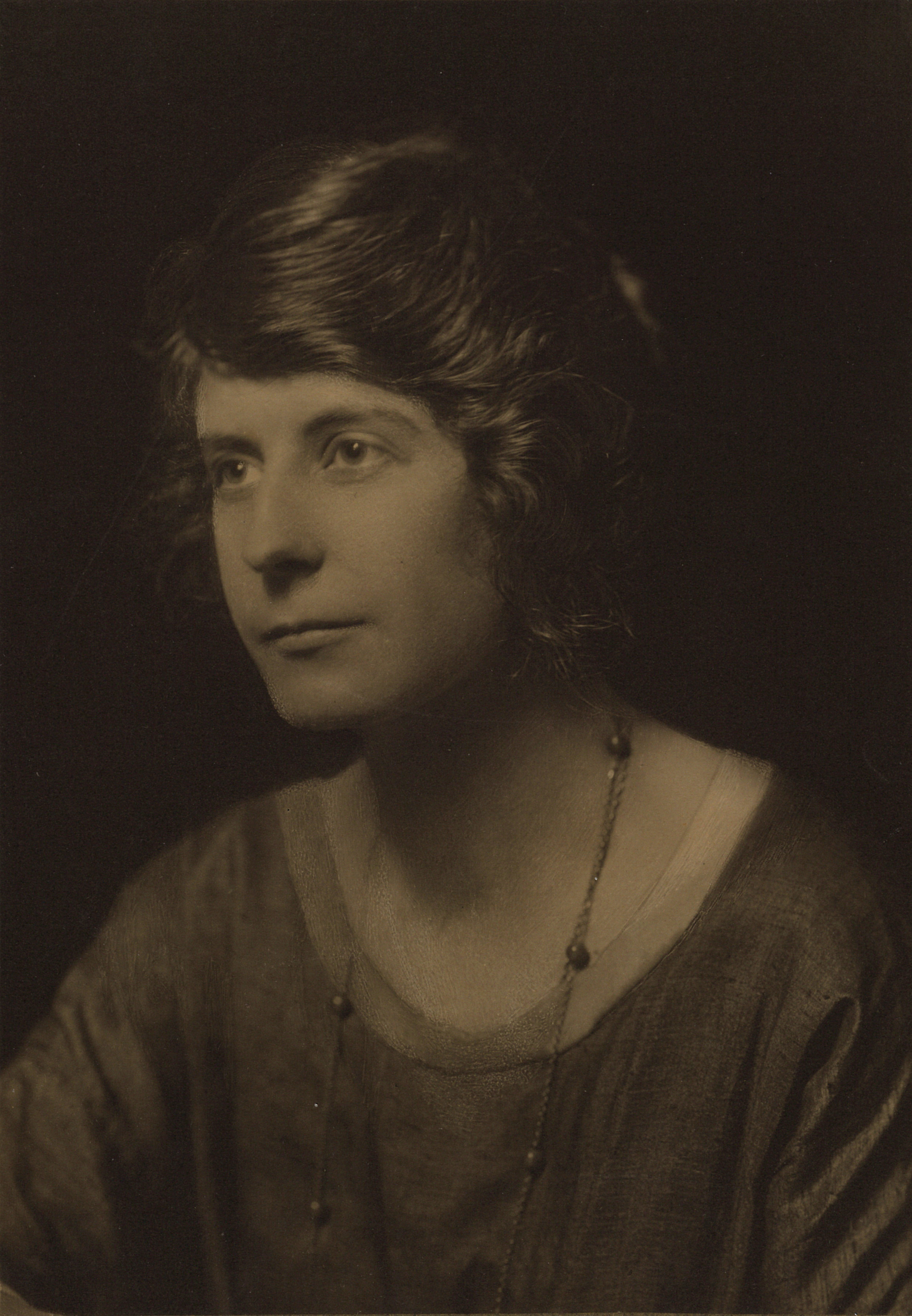
Vera Douie c.1914–1920

Vera Ruth Gordon Douie (1894–1979) was a Scottish librarian. She is known as the first librarian at The Women's Service library. She was an active member of the women's rights movement and her work was recognised with an OBE in 1967.

Throughout Douie's life, she was an active force of the women’s movement, specifically maintaining involvement in the Association for Moral and Social Hygiene. During World War II, Douie was a campaigner for equal rights, and she wrote books about women's employment.

== Background ==
Her parents were Sir James McCrone Douie, a British civil servant in India, and Frances Mary Elizabeth Roe, daughter of Charles Arthur Roe; they had ten children. Her parents later moved back to the United Kingdom: her father's address c.1920 was 2 Chadlington Road, Oxford.

Vera's mother was a botanist and botanical artist, a friend of George Claridge Druce and contributor to the Flora of Oxfordshire (1927). Her address in 1938 was 12 Charlbury Road, Oxford. Mavis Batey moved into that house in the 1960s; her biographer Jean Stone described the daughters of the family as having scholarly interests and being "emancipated, well-educated North Oxford women." Mary Buchan Douie of the London School of Medicine for Women was her aunt, one of the first eight female graduates from Edinburgh University in 1893.

Vera Douie was born in Lahore, British India, in 1894. Her education began in Salisbury, England, at the Godolphin School. She continued her studies at the University of Oxford, at the Society of Oxford Home-Students, in 1912, at a period when women were not awarded degrees. She eventually took a degree there, in 1926.

== Librarian ==
Leaving Oxford, Douie chose to live and work in London, rather than be supported by her family in India. From 1916 to 1921, she worked at the War Office library, as a library assistant. In 1921 she became the indexer of The Medical History of the War.

When the Women's Service House was opened by the London and National Society for Women's Service (LNSWS), Douie was brought in as librarian. It had been the Fleece Inn, a Georgian public house located at 35-37 Marsham Street, Westminster. A donation to Millicent Fawcett meant the LNSWS, previously known under other names and in rented accommodation, was able to establish a permanent headquarters. The House also provided accommodation for the Women's Service Library, founded at the same time in 1926. On 1 January 1926, Douie began there as its first librarian, and remained in the role for 41 years. She retired in 1967.

During her time as librarian, Douie transformed what had been a small library. The collection had been founded in 1909 by Ruth Cavendish Bentinck as a subscription library of feminist materials. Added to that was the Edward Wright collection, presented by Lady Wright (née Jane Georgina Wilson), wife of Sir Almroth Edward Wright who was anti-suffragist, named in honour of their son Edward who died in 1913 in a gun accident while he was a student at Trinity College, Dublin. On the splitting of the National Union of Societies for Equal Citizenship, the Cavendish Bentinck collection passed temporarily to the Townswomen's Guild; but Cavendish Bentinck made a new trust deed, giving it in 1931 to the LNSWS, so it remained with the Women’s Service Library.

Through her involvement with the Association for Moral and Social Hygiene, Douie secured the accession of the large Josephine Butler collection. She also acquired the collection of Myra Sadd Brown, a suffragette and internationalist, with material on British colonies, South Asia and Africa. When Virginia Woolf was writing Three Guineas in the later 1930s, Douie and the library were major sources for facts and figures. Woolf donated books, and from 1938 funded purchases of books wanted by the library.

The House was bombed in 1940, and proved unusable after WWII ended. Douie worked on the library's conversion into the Fawcett Library of the Fawcett Society. It later became The Women's Library. The library passed to the British Library of Political and Economic Science of the London School of Economics in 2013. The collection holds two oral history interviews with Douie, one in April 1975 and the other in December 1976, recorded by Brian Harrison as part of the Suffrage Interviews project, titled Oral evidence on the suffragette and suffragist movements: the Brian Harrison interviews.. Douie talks about the establishment and growth of the library including donations and development of the collections, and some of its well known users, including Virginia Woolf, Eleanor Rathbone and Ray Strachey.

After leaving the Fawcett Library, Douie was brought in during the 1970s to help curate the Sybil Campbell collection at what is now Crosby Moran Hall; now in part at the Martial Rose Library of the University of Winchester.

== Works ==
The LNSWS had roots in the Women's Service Bureau founded by the London NUWSS in World War I. During the 1920s, the London Society for Women's Service, precursor of the LNSWS, campaigned alongside other feminist organisations, such as the Six Point Group and the Open Door Council, on the equal pay issue. The LNSWS secretary from 1926 to 1951 was Philippa Strachey. Her Memorandum on the Position of English Women in Relation to that of English Men was published by the LNSWS in 1935. Ray Strachey, her sister and President of the LNSWS until her death in 1940, published in 1927 a pamphlet Women's Suffrage and Women's Service, subtitled the History of the London and National Society for Women's Service. She followed it in 1935 with Careers and Openings for Women, subtitled A Survey of Women's Employment and a Guide for Those Seeking Work, published by Faber & Faber.

Douie published on women's employment:

- The Lesser Half (1943). It examined the laws and practices that encouraged discrimination against women introduced during World War II, and was published on behalf of the Women's Publicity Planning Association (WPPA). The WPPA was formed in 1939 by Margery Corbett Ashby and Rebecca Sieff. Douie commented on "limitations imposed on women's contribution to governance", as opposed to implementations of policy.
- The Professional Position of Women: A World Survey Immediately Preceding World War II (1947), editor
- Daughters of Britain: an account of the work of British women during the second World War (1950)

She wrote a biography of Aeta Lamb for the Suffragette Fellowship Collection of the Museum of London.

Douie had a long-term interest in "social hygiene", a euphemism of the period covering health aspects of sex education, sex work and sexually-transmitted diseases. Her aunt Mary Buchan Douie was by 1918 a lecturer for the National Council for Combating Venereal Diseases, later known as the British Social Hygiene Council. Carolyn Oldfield attributes to Vera Douie the third edition (1931) of the hygiene pamphlet England's Girls and England's Future, previously published by Mary Buchan Douie.

== Awards and honours ==
In 1967, after her retirement, Douie was awarded an OBE, to honour her work.

== Death ==
Vera Douie died on 11 January 1979 at 2 Charlbury Road, Oxford.
