= Ruth Cavendish-Bentinck =

Women's suffragist and socialist (1867–1953)

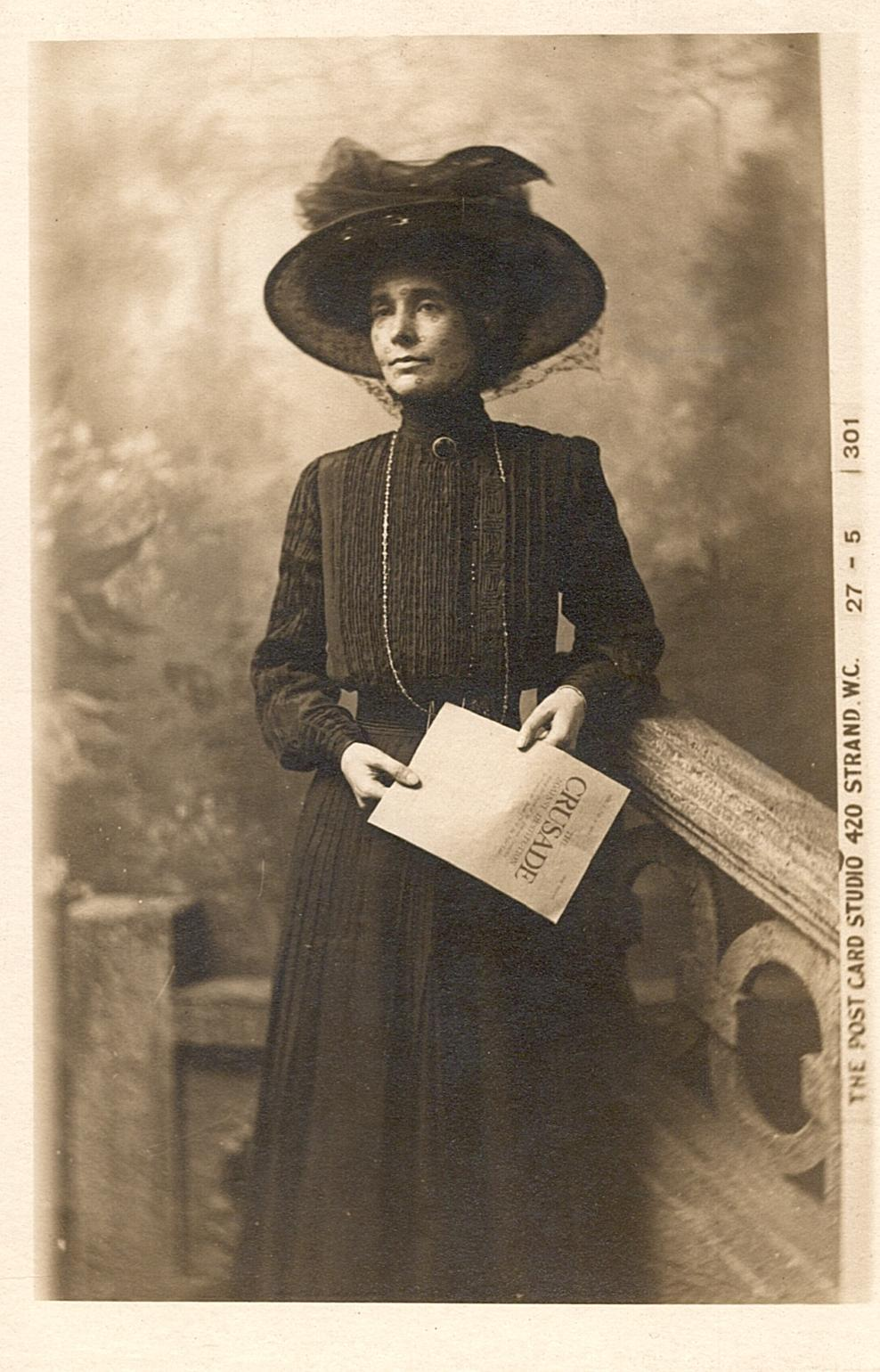
- Born: Ruth Mary St Maur; 21 October 1867; Tangier, Morocco
- Died: 28 January 1953 (aged 85); London, England
- Known for: Suffragette and founding a Women's Library
- Spouse: Frederick Cavendish-Bentinck (m. 1885; died 1948)
- Parent(s): Ferdinand Seymour, Earl St. Maur; Rosina Elizabeth Swan

Ruth Mary Cavendish-Bentinck (née St Maur; 21 October 1867 – 28 January 1953) was a Morocco-born British aristocrat, suffragist and socialist. Her library was the basis for what is now the Women's Library.

== Early life ==
Bentinck was born in Tangier in 1867, the illegitimate daughter of aristocrat Ferdinand Seymour, Earl St. Maur, and a housemaid, Rosina Elizabeth Swan. Her father was the son and heir of Edward, 12th Duke of Somerset, and his wife, Georgiana Sheridan (a daughter of Thomas Sheridan and the novelist Caroline Callander).

Her parents brought her to England, where they had a son, Harold St. Maur, but her father died in 1869 and they never married. She and her brother were brought up by her paternal grandparents after her mother married again and her stepfather died. Her illegitimacy was a problem during her childhood but this was balanced by the education and care that her de facto parents gave her. They also gave her their surname. When her grandmother died in 1884 she was left £80,000 (equivalent to £8,595,000 in 2025).

== Political involvement ==
In 1909, she joined the Women's Social and Political Union. This was a militant organisation who believed in "Deeds not Words". Bentinck did wear a sandwich board but unlike many of its members she was never arrested. She wrote The Point Of Honour: A Correspondence On Aristocracy And Socialism in 1909. The third key event in 1909 was founding a library that was to become in time the Women's Library.

In 1912, Bentinck and Florence Gertrude de Fonblanque organised a suffrage demonstration that involved women dressed in brown, green and white walking from Edinburgh to London. The "Brown Women" gathered signatures for a petition and national attention. The following year de Fonblanque and Bentick decided to set up the Qui Vive Corps. The idea was that these brown, green and white uniformed volunteers would appear at suffrage events organised by any organisation. It was intended that these would attend any suffrage inspired event. The Qui Vive Corps were involved in campaigning among the miners for the Labour Party in Derbyshire and Staffordshire. The reason for their support for Labour was because the suffragettes objected to the governing Liberal Party's policy of not supporting women's suffrage.

In 1913, she was involved with the Northern Men's Federation for Women's Suffrage which she was helping to organise. In 1918, her library was given to the National Union of Women's Suffrage Societies (NUWSS) although Bentinck still took a strong interest. The library is considered her most important legacy. The NUWSS gave the library to the Women's (Service) Library in 1931. Her collection is considered to be the core of what is now the important Women's Library.

== Personal life ==
In 1885, she married an aristocrat named Frederick Cavendish-Bentinck (1856–1948). Frederick, a son of the Rt. Hon. George Cavendish-Bentinck, inherited his father's debts when he died. His older brother was William George Cavendish-Bentinck, British Member of Parliament who married the American heiress, Elizabeth Livingston (who had two girls but no boys). Together, Ruth and Frederick were the parents of four surviving children, including:

- Ferdinand Cavendish-Bentinck, 8th Duke of Portland (1888–1980), who served as Private Secretary to Governor of Uganda from 1925 to 1927 and as Speaker of Kenyan Legislative Council.
- Lucy Joan Cavendish-Bentinck (1889–1954), who married Sir Reginald Hervey Hoare, the British Envoy to Persia from 1931 to 1934.
- Victor Cavendish-Bentinck, 9th Duke of Portland (1897–1990), who served as Assistant Under Secretary of State, Foreign Office in 1944 and as the British Ambassador to Poland from 1945 to 1947.
- Venetia Barbara Cavendish-Bentinck (1902–1980), named after Frederick's sister, Venetia James (née Cavendish-Bentinck), wife of racehorse owner and breeder John Arthur James.

Bentinck died at her home on Marylebone Road in London in 1953.
