= Laura Ainsworth =

English teacher and suffragette (1885–1958)

Laura Frances Ainsworth
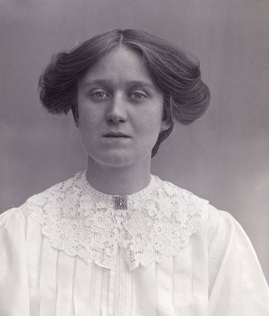
- in 1911 - photo by Col Linley Blathwayt
- Born: Laura Frances Ainsworth; 1885; Blything, England
- Died: 1958 (aged 72–73); Yorkshire, England
- Occupations: Teacher; suffragette

Laura Frances Ainsworth (1885–1958) was an English teacher and suffragette. She was employed by the Women's Social and Political Union (WSPU) and was one of the first suffragettes to be force-fed. She left the WSPU in 1912 in protest at the ejection of the Pethick-Lawrences, but continued to work for women's suffrage.

== Life ==
Ainsworth was born in Blything in Suffolk in 1885, and she was brought up in Salisbury. She became a teacher but decided in 1909 to become a full time worker for the Women's Social and Political Union (WSPU) in 1909.

Ainsworth was drafted to co-ordinate WSPU activities in the Midlands with Gladice Keevil. She was involved in the protest on 17 September 1909 when Charlotte Marsh, Mary Leigh and Patricia Woodlock climbed onto the roof of Bingley Hall in Birmingham. They were protesting at women being excluded from a political meeting where the British Prime Minister Asquith was giving a speech. Marsh, Leigh and Woodlock threw roof tiles which they levered up with an axe at the Asquith's car and at the police. They went to trial and were sent onto Winson Green Prison, along with Hilda Burkitt and as they arrived were singing protest songs loudly and refusing to wear prison dress claiming 'political' not criminal status.

Ainsworth was with Hugh Franklin on the train that Churchill was travelling on when he challenged him on his attitude to suffragettes and caused a scene in which Franklin was arrested and went on hunger strike in prison himself .

She worked at the Woman's Press shop in 1910 and was an organiser in Kent, later she left Newcastle WSPU due to split in the movement and worked for Votes for Women with National Political League. The league was started by Mary Adelaide Broadhurst and Margaret Milne Farquharson and in 1913 Ainsworth would be the NPL secretary.

== First force-feeding ==
In protest about not being treated as a political prisoner she, Mabel Capper, Marsh and Leigh went on hunger strike while in Winson Green Prison. They became some of the first suffragette hunger strikers to be forcibly fed. Ainsworth objected to being forcibly fed. After she was released she wrote an open letter to the first hunger striker, Marion Wallace Dunlop, describing her experience. Ainsworth described in how it felt when she was force fed as "horrible choking and stunned sensation" and the removal of the tube felt 'as if my inside was being pulled out' in Votes for Women 8 October 1909. The WSPU took advantage of the opportunity for publicity and after a doctor's report of physical and "nervous' damage, prepared an unsuccessful case for assault against the home secretary and prison authorities on their behalf. Ernest Helby (who did the force feeding) wrote to the Home Office after being threatened in the street by Ainsworth and Patricia Woodlock, and later had windows broken but police kept it quiet.

== If women don't count, then they were not going to be counted ==
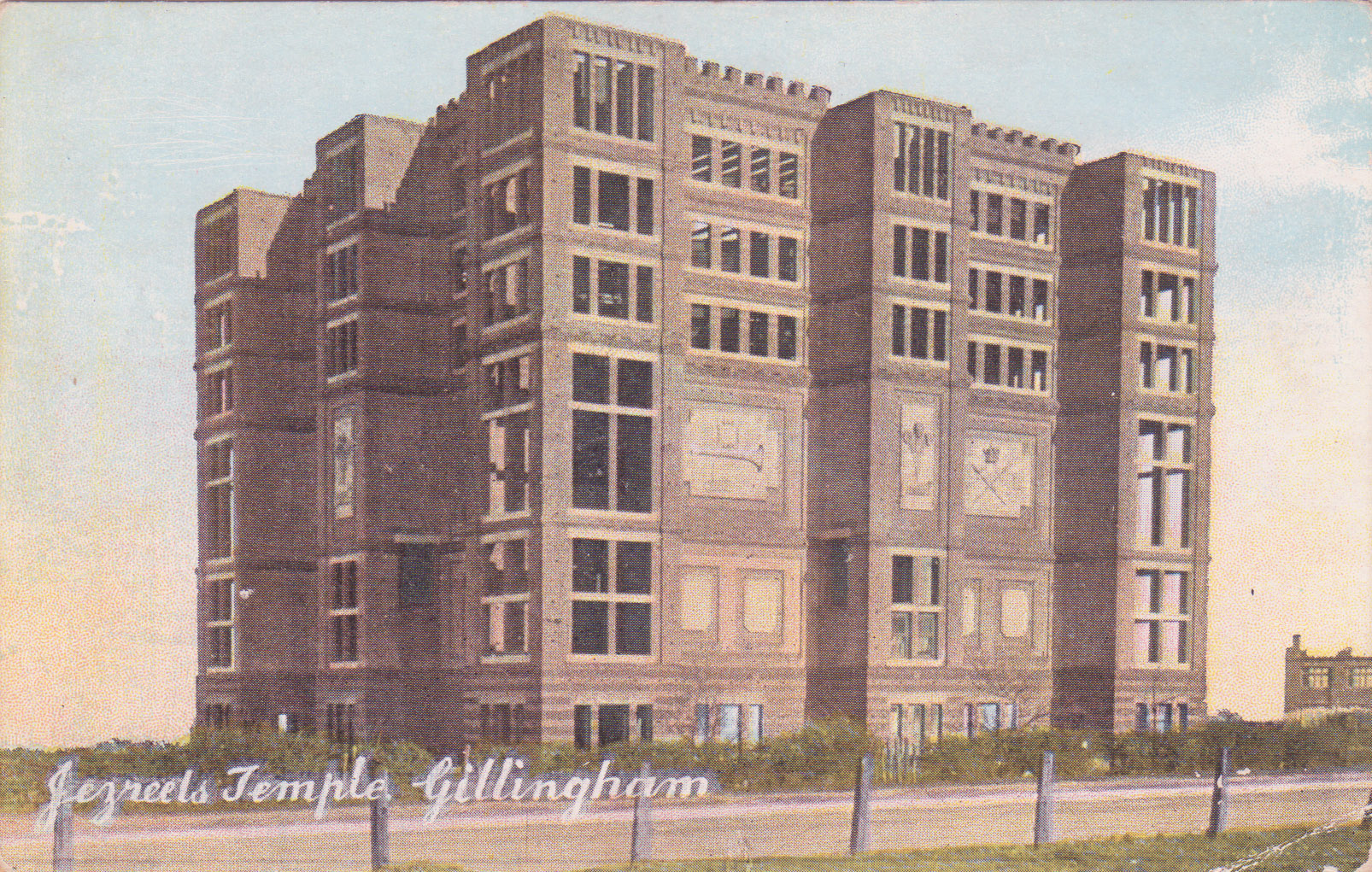
Jezreel's Tower or Temple

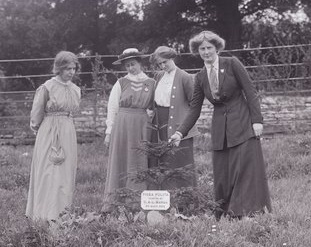
Charlotte Marsh is shown here planting a tree at Eagle House witnessed by Annie Kenney, Mary Blathwayt and Ainsworth (3rd from L)

2 April 1911 was the night of the British census when the government recorded details of everyone living in the United Kingdom. The WSPU as part of their campaign of civil disobedience had decided that if women "didn't count, then they were not going to be counted". Ainsworth hired a room used by a dance academy in Jazreel's Hall (the religious folly known as Jezreel's Tower in Gillingham). Ainsworth was boarding locally with a WSPU supporter. Over 40 women gathered there to avoid being at home during the census. However they enjoyed themselves so much that the police were called and they tipped off the census enumerators and they were counted. The census return says "Party of Suffragettes assembled in Dancing Academy – 40 in number 1 male and 39 females", but carries no details of who was there.

== Honour ==
Ainsworth and Marsh were invited as leading suffragettes to Eagle House in Batheaston in April. This was the home of Mary Blathwayt and her parents. They invited leading suffragettes to plant trees to commemorate their achievements. A plaque was made to record each event and Colonel Linley Blathwayt would take photographs. A Cypressus Lawsoniana Wisselii was planted to record Ainsworth's achievement and Colonel Blathwayt also took a portrait photograph.

Ainsworth was given a Hunger Strike Medal 'for valour' by the WSPU.

Ainsworth left the WSPU in protest in 1912 at the ejection of the Pethick-Lawrences from the WSPU.

== Later life and death ==
Ainsworth was active in the Women's Section of the British Legion in the 1930s. She died in Yorkshire in 1958.
