= Agnes Syme Macdonald =

Scottish suffragette (1882–1966)

- Born: 8 September 1882; Edinburgh, Scotland
- Died: 21 October 1966 (aged 84); Edinburgh, Scotland
- Known for: Suffragette and campaigner

Agnes Syme Macdonald (8 September 1882 – 21 October 1966) was a Scottish suffragette who served as the secretary of the Edinburgh branch of the Women's Social and Political Union (WSPU) before setting up the Edinburgh Women Citizens Association (WCA) in 1918. She was WCA's first and longest-serving secretary. She campaigned on various social issues and was active in the Quaker relief work for European refugees (Society of Friends); the Barns School for delinquent city boys and the Edinburgh Old People's Welfare Council.

== Early life ==
Agnes Syme Macdonald was born on 8 September 1882 at 23 Dublin Street, Edinburgh. She was the only daughter of Euphemia Henderson (born in Kinross) and Alexander Macdonald (born in Kiltarlity, Inverness). Agnes was the fifth of six children. Alexander Macdonald was a wine and spirit merchant in Edinburgh and Euphemia, took over the business in 1893.

== Political career ==
Macdonald joined the Women's Social and Political Union (WSPU). She wrote about this choice: "Possibly it's because I was a so-called 'lady of leisure' ... At that time there were too many women running around with no training to do anything." She was among the Scottish women who travelled to London to take part in the protests in early March 1912 after the government announced that no further time would be given to the Conciliation Bill, which would have introduced a measure of women's suffrage. Agnes broke a police office window with a hammer and was charged with malicious damage on 5 March 1912 and given two months' hard labour. Upon her release, she spoke about her experiences in prison to a meeting in Edinburgh. Elizabeth Finlayson Gauld chaired the "crowded meeting"; and made a "moving appeal" to the attendees to give their support to other suffrage campaigners in prison.

In 1913 Agnes served as the secretary of the Edinburgh branch of the WSPU. However, she became alienated by the militant suffrage campaigns and helped set up the Edinburgh Women Citizens' Association (WCA) in 1918. Such Women's citizens' associations were formed throughout Britain to politically organize women and to promote women's representation. The Edinburgh association was inaugurated in Edinburgh city chambers on 9 May 1918. According to minutes from a WCA meeting in 1918-1919 the hall were filled with women, who showed keen interest and great enthusiasm in the new movement’. Agnes was the WCA's first and longest-serving secretary. Other notable members were Sarah Siddons, Lillias Tait Mitchell, Agnes "Nannie" Brown and Alexi Buttar Jack.

Under Macdonald's leadership WCA worked not only for women's right to vote, but included campaigning for equal pay, for promotion for women teachers, against marriage bans in employment, for pre-school nursery and play facilities, for support for those suffering from mental illness and handicap, for public health, for social housing, against child sexual abuse, and for national maternity service.

Macdonald retired as secretary of the Edinburgh WCA In July 1939. She continued her career as a campaigner in the Quaker relief work for European refugees (Society of Friends); the Barns School for delinquent city boys and the Edinburgh Old People's Welfare Council.

== Private life ==
Macdonald cared for her younger, disabled brother Roddy. She shared a house with him in Strathfillan Road, Edinburgh. She remained unmarried and had no children. Macdonald died on 21 October 1966, at the age of 84, after staying at St Raphael's Home, a nursing home in Blackford Avenue, Edinburgh.
