= Ida Craft =

American suffragist

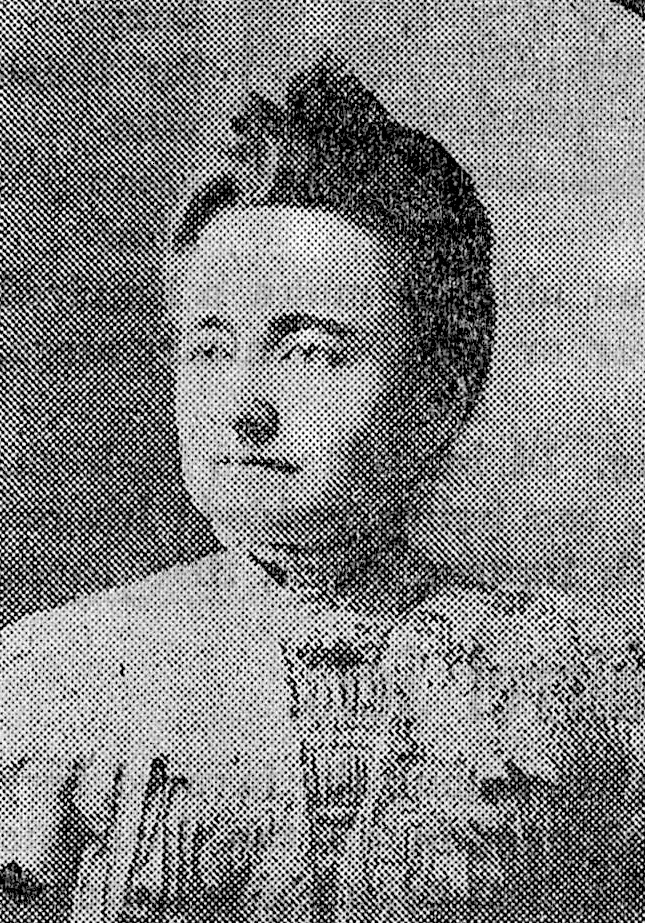
- Ida Craft
- Born: December 25, 1860; Brooklyn, New York
- Died: September 14, 1947 (aged 86–87); Rockland County, New York
- Occupations: Suffragist, social activist, prohibitionist

Ida Augusta Craft (December 25, 1860 – September 14, 1947) was an American suffragist known for her participation in suffrage hikes.

== Early life ==
Craft was born in Brooklyn, New York in 1860, the daughter of John Craft and Eleanor Voorhies Perlee Craft. Her father was a tailor.

== Activism ==
Craft was an officer of the Bedford Political Equality League in 1897, president of the Kings County Political Equality League and belonged to the Brooklyn chapter of the Woman Suffrage Party. She attended National Woman Suffrage Association's 1900 convention in Minneapolis as a delegate. She campaigned for suffrage in Ohio in 1912.

Known as the "Colonel", because she assisted the "General", Rosalie Gardiner Jones, Craft took a visible leadership role in the 1912–1914 Suffrage Hikes. She was arrested during the hike to Boston with Elisabeth Freeman and Vera Winthrop; they were briefly detained in Hartford, for breaking laws around the use of a vehicle for advertising and the distribution of flyers.

After the suffrage hikes, she campaigned for women's suffrage in Montana, Nevada, Nebraska, Alaska, and Canada, and was a delegate to the International Alliance of Women convention in 1922, when it was held in Rome.

Craft was an active member of the Young Women's Christian Association (YWCA) and the Woman's Christian Temperance Union (WCTU). She was elected as a Delegate at Large to the Constitutional Convention in New York in 1914, representing the Prohibition Party.

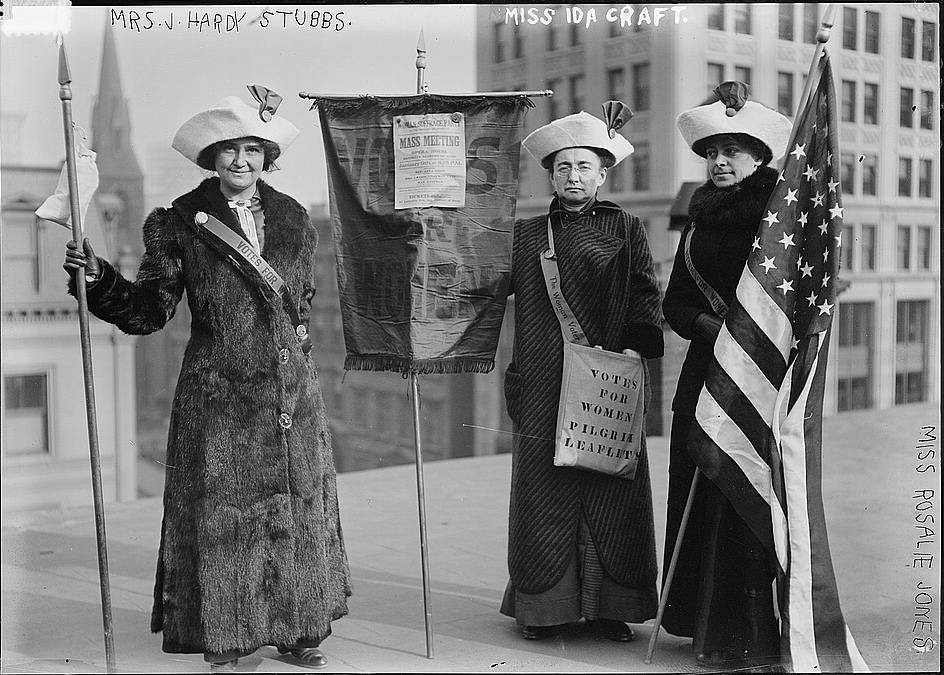
Mrs. J. Hardy Stubbs, Miss Ida Craft, Miss Rosalie Jones circa 1912-1913

== Personal life and legacy ==
Craft inherited a "large sum" when her mother died in 1913. She died at home in Pearl River, Rockland County in 1947, at the age of 86. Her grave is in Green-Wood Cemetery in Brooklyn. In 2021, the Kingsborough Art Museum created a digital exhibition about Craft's activism.

== See also ==
- List of suffragists and suffragettes
- List of women's rights activists
- Timeline of women's suffrage
