= Men's League for Women's Suffrage (United Kingdom) =

British women's suffrage society

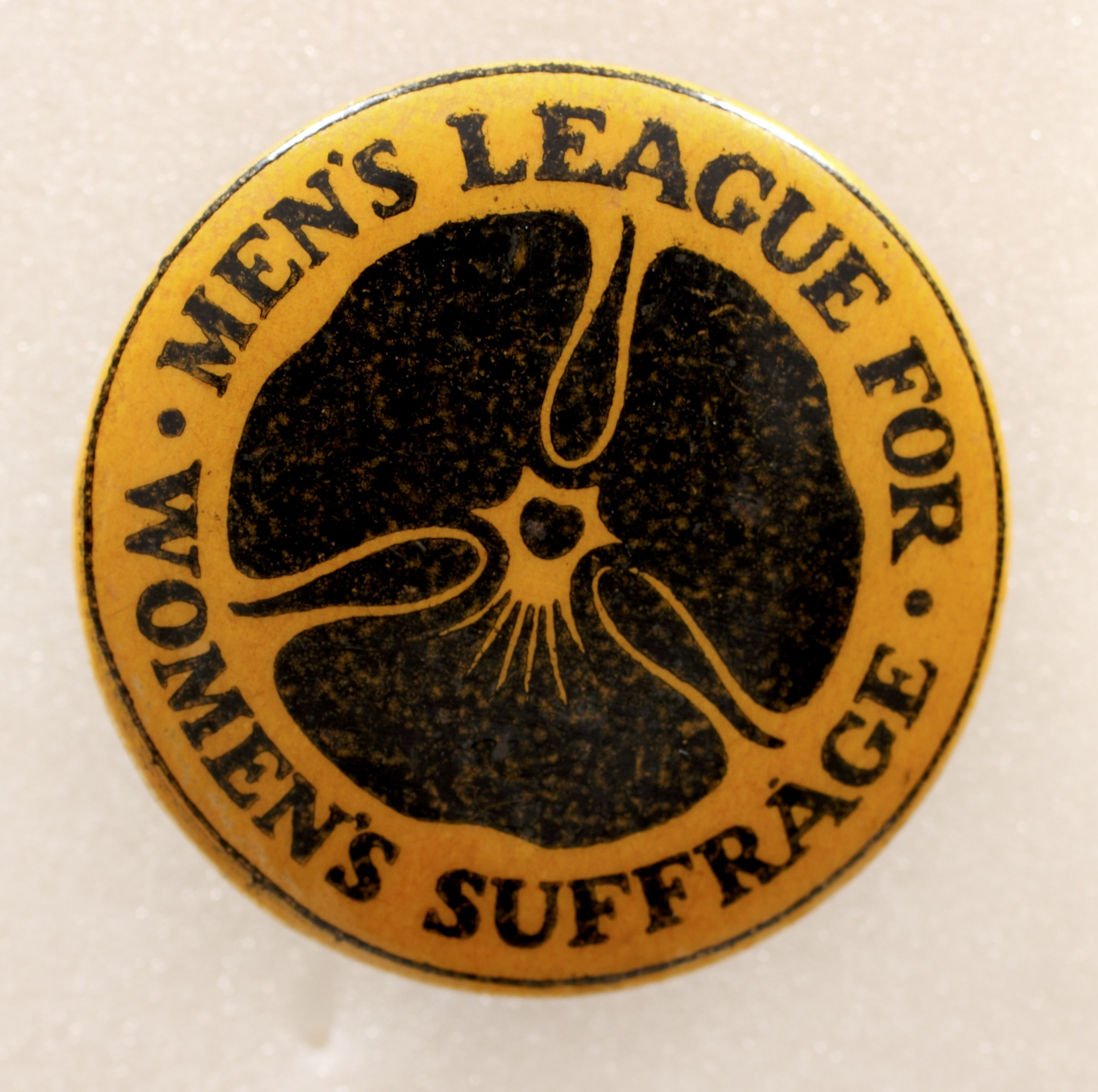
- Men's League for Women's Suffrage badge (UK)
- Formation: 1907 (UK)
- Founders: Henry Brailsford et al (UK)
- Location: London

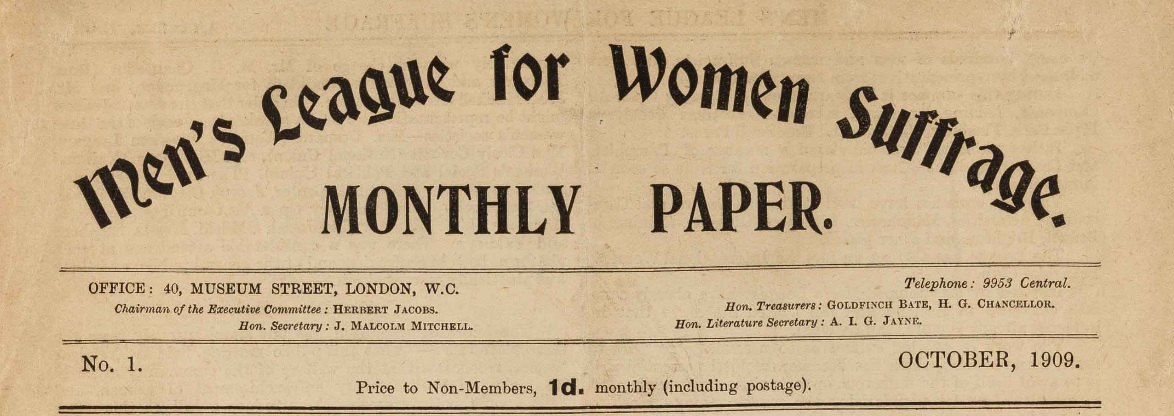
Masthead of the paper of the Men's League for Women's Suffrage Monthly Paper

The Men's League for Women's Suffrage was a society formed in 1907 in London and was part of the women's suffrage movement in the United Kingdom.

== History ==
Graham Moffat, founder of the sister organisation, the Northern Men's League for Women's Suffrage in Glasgow.

The society formed in 1907 in London by Henry Brailsford, Charles Corbett, Henry Nevinson, Laurence Housman, C. E. M. Joad, Hugh Franklin, Henry Harben, Gerald Gould, Charles Mansell-Moullin, Israel Zangwill and 32 others. Graham Moffat founded the Northern Men's League for Women's Suffrage in Glasgow also in 1907 and wrote a suffrage propaganda play, The Maid and the Magistrate.

Bertrand Russell stood as a suffrage candidate in the 1907 Wimbledon by election.

By 1910 Henry Brailsford and Lord Lytton had, with Millicent Fawcett's permission, created a proposal that might have been the basis of an agreement that caused the suffrage movement to declare a truce on 14 February.

In 1911 they successfully took Liberals in Bradford to court for assaulting Alfred Hawkins. Alfred had shouted a question during a speech by Winston Churchill and he was ejected from the hall without warning. The judge considered this to be assault. Hawkins had received a fractured kneecap and he was awarded £100 plus costs. The group heard from orators including George Lansbury, Edith Mansell-Moullin, and Victor Duval in March 1912. Speakers there expressed their disgust at the treatment of William Ball, a male suffrage supporter and hunger striker, for being not only force-fed but effectively driven to lunacy and separated from his family by the authorities. Nevison produced a pamphlet on his case for the League, with the subtitle "Official Brutality on the increase".

== See also ==
- Women's Social and Political Union, which included male members in the Men’s Political Union for Women’s Enfranchisement (MPU).
- Women's suffrage
