= Northern Men's Federation for Women's Suffrage =

Scottish women's suffrage movement

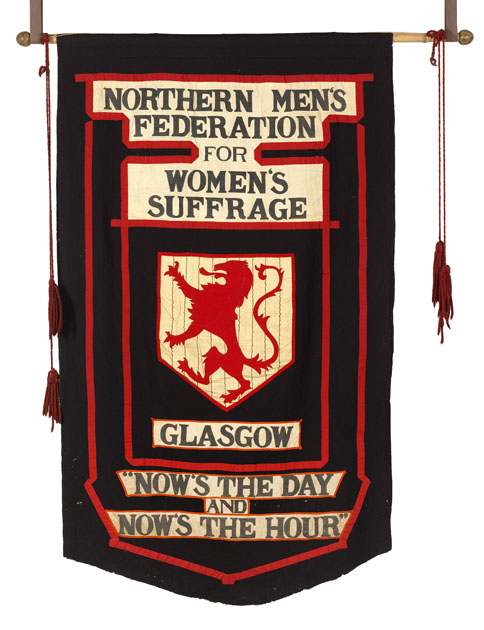
Banner of the Northern Men's League for Women's Suffrage

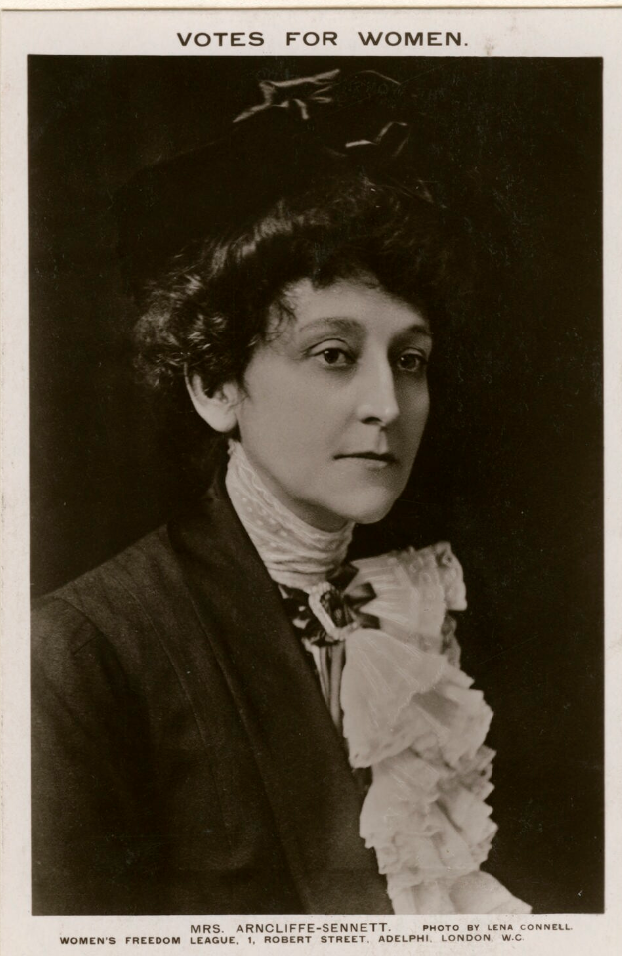
Maud Arncliffe Sennett by Lena Connell

Graham Moffat, the league founder, c.1912.

The Northern Men's Federation for Women's Suffrage was an organisation which was active in Scotland during the later part of the campaign for women's suffrage.

== Formation ==
In 1907, after the imprisonment of his wife, Maggie Moffat for suffrage activity, Graham Moffat formed the Glasgow Men's League for Women's Suffrage. It was intended to offer support and solidarity for the husbands and brothers of women involved in the campaign, as well as male sympathisers.

Many of the members were politically active and powerful men who wanted to use their influence in the campaign.

In July 1913, organised by Maud Arncliffe Sennett, a large delegation of Scottish men travelled to London for an audience with the prime minister, H. H. Asquith, to discuss extending the franchise to women. The request for a meeting was refused. A direct result of this failure to meet with them was that they formed the new campaigning organisation. The artist John Wilson McLaren wrote a verse about the trip:

We've come from the North, and the heather's on fire,

To fight for the women–our only desire;

At last we've been roused thro' the treachery shown

By knaves at Westminster–the knaves we disown!'

The inaugural meeting was held in Glasgow on 11 September 1913. The founder, president, and main organiser of the July deputation was Maud Arncliffe Sennett. She had discussed the possibility of a men's campaigning organisation on the train to the funeral of Emily Davison, which she attended on behalf of the Actresses' Franchise League. The honorary secretary of the Edinburgh branch was Nannie Brown.

Branches were formed in Midlothian and Berwick upon Tweed.

== Activities ==
The league had no party political loyalties, and supported all of the different suffrage groups, whether militant or constitutional. They sent petitions and resolutions to those in power, and corresponded with other organisations to rally support.

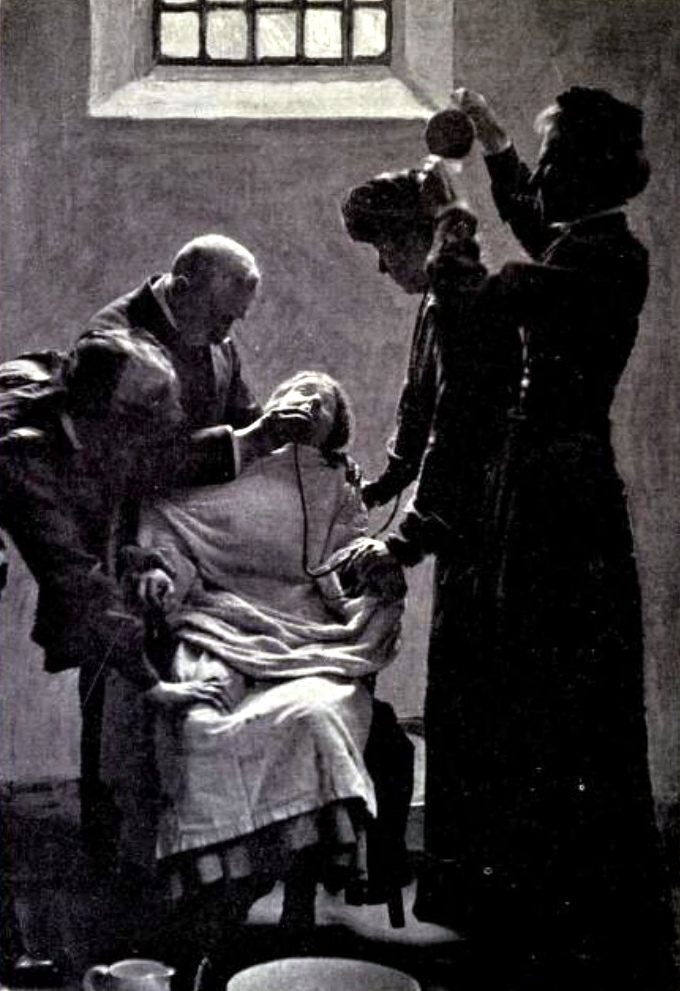
Force-feeding of suffragists on hunger-strike.

They held a meeting in Bridgeton in November 1913, which was addressed by Maud Arncliffe Sennet, Henry Harben, JP, Bailie Alston and Helen Crawfurd, who "welcomed the NMF as a new order of chivalry: it came to fight for the oppressed and sweated women worker". In the same month they also met in the Synod Hall, Edinburgh, and were addressed by John Cockburn, Mrs Cavendish Bentinck, and Maud Arncliffe Sennett. On 14 February 1914, the Northern Men's Federation for Women's Suffrage was to hold a mass meeting in Memorial Hall, London, and the following day a Trafalgar Square demonstration. The 'War Song" titled "Justice For Ever" by J. Wilson McLaren was to be sung in full at these events, to the air "The Macgregors' Gathering", and the words printed (the day before the first event) in the Women's Freedom League newspaper The Vote:

We've come from the North, and the heather's on fire,
To fight for the women – our only desire;
At last we've been roused thro' the treachery shown
By knaves at Westminster–the knaves we disown!
Then rally, rally, rally, Englishmen!
With the Scots by your side, help the Cause that is just -
The mothers who bore us, we cannot but trust -
They're voteless, voteless, voteless!
Voteless, voteless, voteless!
Then prove yourselves heroes! Oppressors? No, never!
The Women shall triumph! It's Justice for ever!
The torture of martyrs has stirred the whole nation -
Wives, sisters and mothers - vile degradation!
It's shameful, shameful, shameful, Englishmen!
Shameful, shameful, shameful!
Then join the fray - turn the Government out
That still dares the Mandate of voters to flout:
For Freedom our forefathers fought long ago,
And the sons from auld Scotland will strike, too, a blow!
Then help us, help us, Englishmen!
The "Forcible Feeding" and "Cat-and-Mouse Bill,"
We're now more determined than ever to kill;
Then rally, rally, rally!
Rally, rally, rally!
"Votes for Women" our cry. Cease fighting? No, never!
Till victory is won, and - Justice for ever!

Both Nannie Brown and Maud Arncliffe Sennett visited the City of Edinburgh Council and were welcomed and given a lunch with the Lord Provost and councillors (the week before) and were organising the deputation to London. Councillors Murray and Crawford were to take part, and a large and supportive rally on the Mound, Edinburgh took place.

In April 1914, the league took part in a larger demonstration at Cupar, where H. H. Asquith was standing in a ministerial by-election. They announced their intention of opposing him at the next general election.

The league continued their campaigning work during the war years, which included an open-air meeting at The Meadows, Edinburgh in May 1915, a demonstration in July 1915, addressed by Maud Arncliffe Sennett, and a meeting in April 1916. Their activities continued until 1919.

== Notable members and speakers ==
- Cunninghame Graham
- William Graham
- Charles Mabon
- Maud Arncliffe Sennett
- Nannie Brown
- J Wilson McLaren

== See also ==
- Men's League for Women's Suffrage (United Kingdom)
- Women's suffrage in the United Kingdom
