= Rosalie Gardiner Jones =

American politician

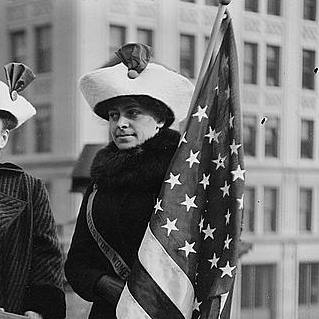
- Born: February 24, 1883; Cold Spring Harbor, New York U.S.
- Died: January 12, 1978 (aged 94)
- Occupation: Suffragette
- Spouse: Clarence Dill (m. 1927; div. 1936)
- Parents: Oliver Livingston Jones Sr. (father); Mary Elizabeth Jones (mother)

Rosalie Gardiner Jones (February 24, 1883 – January 12, 1978) was an American suffragette. She took the "Pankhursts" as role models and after hearing of the "Brown Women" she organised marches to draw attention to the suffrage cause. She was known as "General Jones" because of her following.

== Early life and education ==
Jones was born in Cold Spring Harbor, New York. Her mother was Mary Elizabeth Jones, who came from a wealthy upper-class family, the Joneses. Her father was Oliver Livingston Jones Sr. When Rosalie's mother died in 1918 of Spanish Flu, her son inherited the family Manor, Jones Manor. Yet after many years of fighting over the house and accusations of mistreatment of the Manor, Rosalie finally inherited the Manor for herself. Rosalie and her mother had very different views about women's suffrage. Where Mary Elizabeth was a part of the New York State Anti-Suffrage Associations, Rosalie was an active suffragist and Nassau County President of the National American Woman Suffrage Association.

Jones received a Bachelor of Arts degree from Adelphi College in Brooklyn, then attended Brooklyn Law School. She earned her LL. B degree from George Washington College of Law. Jones also earned a Doctor of Civil Law degree from American University. She completed two different theses, "The Labor Party in England" and The American Standard of Living and World Cooperation.

== Career ==
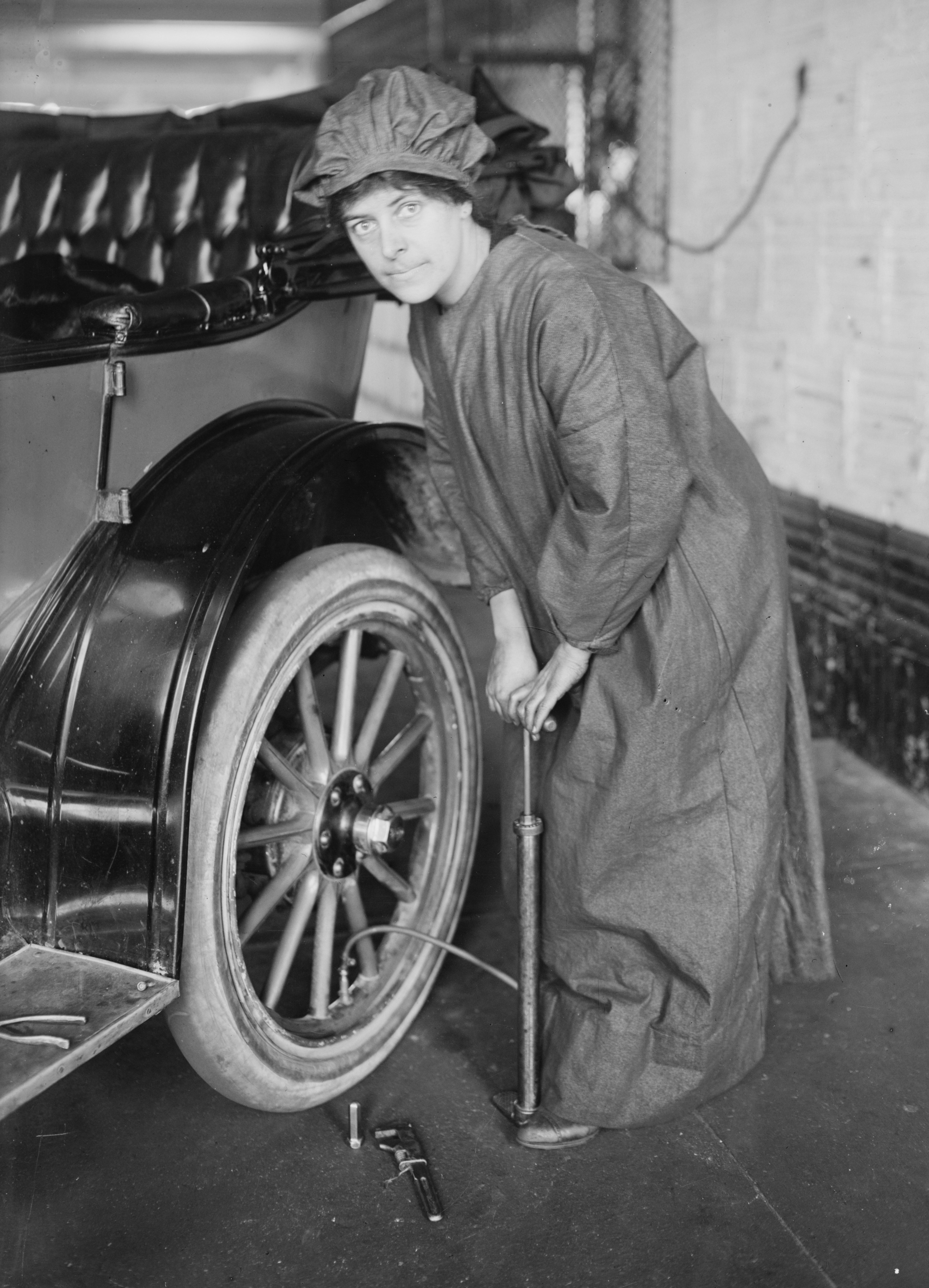
Jones, circa 1910-1915

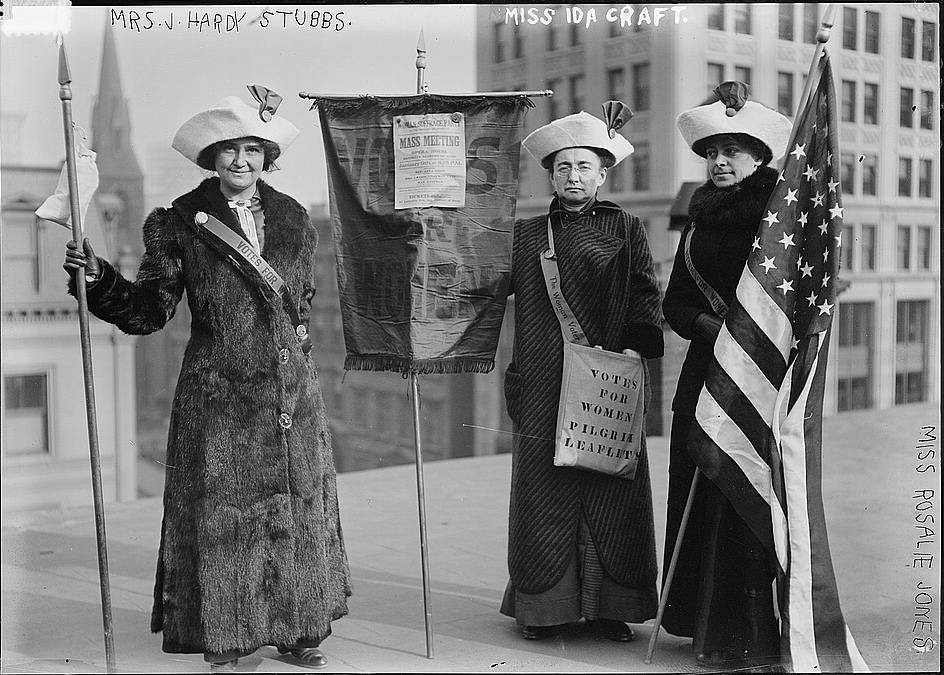
Jones, with fellow suffragettes Jessie Stubbs and Ida Craft, circa 1912-1913

Jones was influenced in her beliefs about women's role in society from the "Pankhursts," who were British suffragettes. She organised marches similar to the "Brown Women" march from Edinburgh to London some months before. Some of her most famous marches include her march to Albany, New York in December 1912, and the march to Washington D.C. in February 1913. During her famous march from Manhattan, New York to Albany, New York, she led over 200 women over 175 miles in thirteen days. Even though her mother was an anti-suffragist, Rosalie went against her mother's wishes to take part in these marches.

In early 1913, General Rosalie Jones and her "pilgrims", as they were called, planned to reach the Capitol of the United States. Reports say that there were preparations made for the 225 women for their welcome and even a royal reception. One pilgrim, Miss Constance Leupp, arrived days earlier and denied the stories about the hardships the marchers suffered through. She was quoted, "[On the march] they had 'loads of fun'." General Genevieve Wilmsatt, chief of the cavalry brigade, would lead her own horsewomen to meet General Jones with her pilgrims. At Laurel, Maryland, Jones spent the night during the march. It was here where Genevieve officially met Jones and escorted them into the city.

Jones was known to her army of warriors as "General Jones" and with good reason. Jones believed in fighting a strong battle and was not afraid to do something dramatic to get her point across. Her marches might not have been as famous as the protests Alice Paul organized, but Jones was a strong leader. Her marches eventually led to the passage of the 19th Amendment on June 4, 1919 and then the ratification of the amendment on August 18, 1920.

In the years after her suffrage protests, Jones still continued to fight for what she believed in. In 1925, she protested Governor Alfred E. Smith and demanded he remove Robert Moses as President of the Long Island Park Commission for appropriation of people's property without fair warning.

With little support, Jones returned to her Long Island home, where she lived by herself. For the next years, Jones was busy breaking traditions, raising goats on her property, and fighting with her neighbors and relatives. Her relationship with her family was always strained and almost never pleasant.

== Personal life ==
On March 15, 1927, Jones married Clarence Dill, a Washington United States Senator. This marriage ended in divorce, which was widely publicized. Dill accused her of being an appalling wife and housekeeper and of embarrassing him constantly. After her divorce, Jones ran unsuccessfully for congressional office in November 1936 as a Democrat.

Jones died on January 12, 1978, and her ashes were scattered outside her mother's tomb at St. John Episcopal Church in Cold Spring Harbor, New York.

== See also ==
- List of suffragists and suffragettes
- List of women's rights activists
- Timeline of women's suffrage
