= Fawcett Society =

British women's rights charity

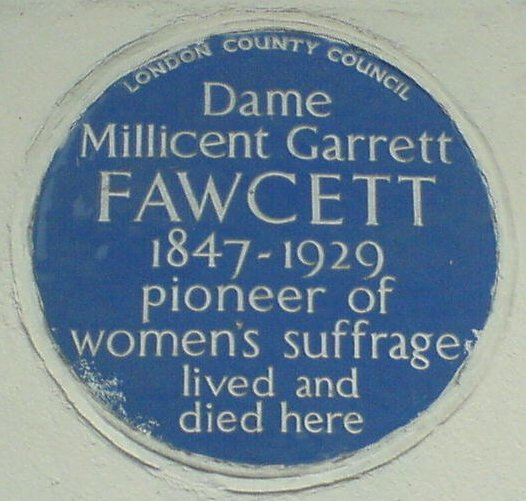
- Blue plaque about founder of the Fawcett Society
- Predecessor: London National Society for Women's Suffrage
- Merged into: London Society for Women's Suffrage
- Formation: 1953
- Founder: Millicent Fawcett
- Headquarters: Vauxhall
- Location: London, England
- Services: Advocacy
- Key people: Jemima Olchawski (CEO); Fiona Mactaggart (Chair of Trustees); Dame Jenni Murray OBE (President)
- Website: www.fawcettsociety.org.uk

The Fawcett Society is a membership charity in the United Kingdom which campaigns for women's rights. The organisation dates back to 1866, when Millicent Garrett Fawcett dedicated her life to the peaceful campaign for women's suffrage. From 1907, it was known as the London Society for Women's Suffrage but had several subsequent name changes. Between 1919 and 1926, it was known as the London Society for Women's Service, and from 1926-1953 as the London & National Society for Women's Service. In 1953, it was renamed the Fawcett Society.

It is a charity registered with the Charity Commission, and has a membership of around 3,000. Its supporters include Carrie Gracie, Emma Thompson, and Ophelia Lovibond. The organisation's vision is a society in which women and girls in all their diversity are equal and free to fulfil their potential, creating a stronger, happier, better future for all. Its key areas of campaign work include equal pay, equal power, tackling gender norms and stereotypes and defending women's rights. The society publishes its own research and aims to bring together politicians, academics, grassroots activists and wider civil society in service of gender equality.

There are local Fawcett Society groups across the UK, which support the campaigning work of Fawcett and organise events and activities in their areas. Locations include Devon, Milton Keynes and Tyneside. The library and archives of the society, formerly the Fawcett Library, are now part of the Women's Library at the British Library of Political and Economic Science, the main library of the London School of Economics and Political Science. A number of oral history interviews undertaken as part of the Suffrage Interviews project, titled Oral evidence on the suffragette and suffragist movements: the Brian Harrison interviews, refer to the Fawcett Society, including interviews with Vera Douie, Kathleen Halpin, and Irene Hilton, and interviews about Ida O'Malley, and Hugh and Alice Franklin.

== Governance ==
The society's chief executive is Penny East, who joined in May 2025. Before then it was Jemima Olchawski, who joined in October 2021. The president of the society in 2020 was Jenni Murray. The society's work is overseen by a board of trustees. The current chair is Fiona Mactaggart, appointed to the role in 2018. Trustees have included:

- Natalie Bennett
- Angela Mason (chair of the society from 2007 to 2013)
- Lee Chalmers
- Joanne Cash

== Governmental action ==
The Fawcett Society filed papers with the High Court of Justice seeking a judicial review of the June 2010 United Kingdom budget, contending that the Treasury did not fully assess the impact that budget cuts would affect different groups, as is required by law. An analysis of the budget found that women would be paying around £5.8 billion of the £8 billion of savings planned. Their judicial review was denied. In September 2020 the society called upon the chancellor to assist the childcare sector in the Autumn 2020 Comprehensive Spending Review, arguing that funds allocated to the UK's furlough scheme will have been wasted if parents are unable to work.

== Gender pay gap ==
In October 2020 the society and the Global Institute for Women's Leadership at King's College London co-published their joint report into legislation surrounding gender pay gap reporting. It found the UK lagged behind other countries in not requiring employers to produce a plan for addressing gender pay gaps, but praised the UK for its transparency and legislative compliance. The society has been criticised by business groups for comparing average pay for full-time men with average-pay for part-time women to highlight the disparity, and a lack of transparency in making their methodology clear. The society incorporated this criticism in its 2015 Gender Pay Gap methodology. The 2015 pay gap quoted was for full-time employees. The society publicises an annual Equal Pay Day, marking the day that women in effect stop being paid when calculated using the full-time mean average gender pay gap. In September 2021 the society published its analysis of the gender gap among local councillors in the UK, showing that only 34% of the 4,980 councillors elected in May that year were women.

== T-Shirt and controversy ==
In October 2014, the Fawcett Society in association with Elle UK and the high street chain Whistles produced a new version of the society's "This Is What a Feminist Looks Like" T-shirt. Politicians who wore the shirt in public included Ed Miliband, Nick Clegg, and Harriet Harman, though Prime Minister David Cameron reportedly declined. The £45 shirt was produced in a Mauritian factory where it was believed migrant workers from Bangladesh, Sri Lanka, India and Vietnam were paid less than a pound a day, slept 16 to a room, and otherwise kept in sweatshop conditions. The Fawcett Society responded with a press release stating, "We remain confident that we took every practicable and reasonable step to ensure that the range would be ethically produced and await a fuller understanding of the circumstances under which the garments were produced." Fawcett were assured by Whistles that their suppliers were "fully audited".

== Commission into public harms ==
Work starts in 2024 on a two year project, a commission into public harms, by both the Fawcett Society and the Black Equity Organisation, and supported by the Barrow Cadbury Trust. The aim is to research the harm done to women, especially Black and marginalised women, by public services such as the police, the health and education systems.

== See also ==
- Women's suffrage in the United Kingdom
