= Suffrage Hikes =

Marches in support of women's right to vote

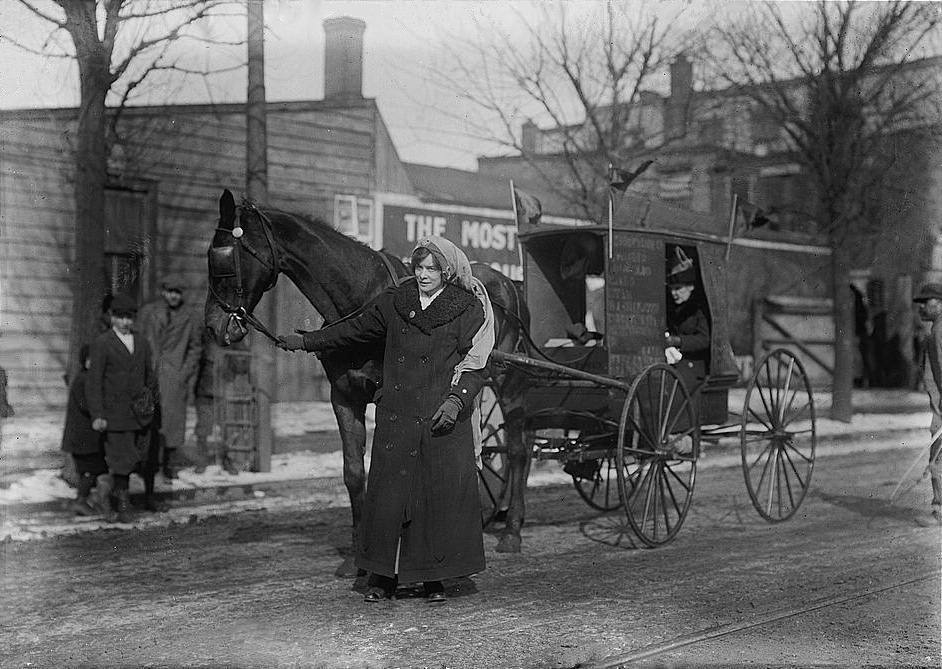
Elisabeth Freeman in 1913

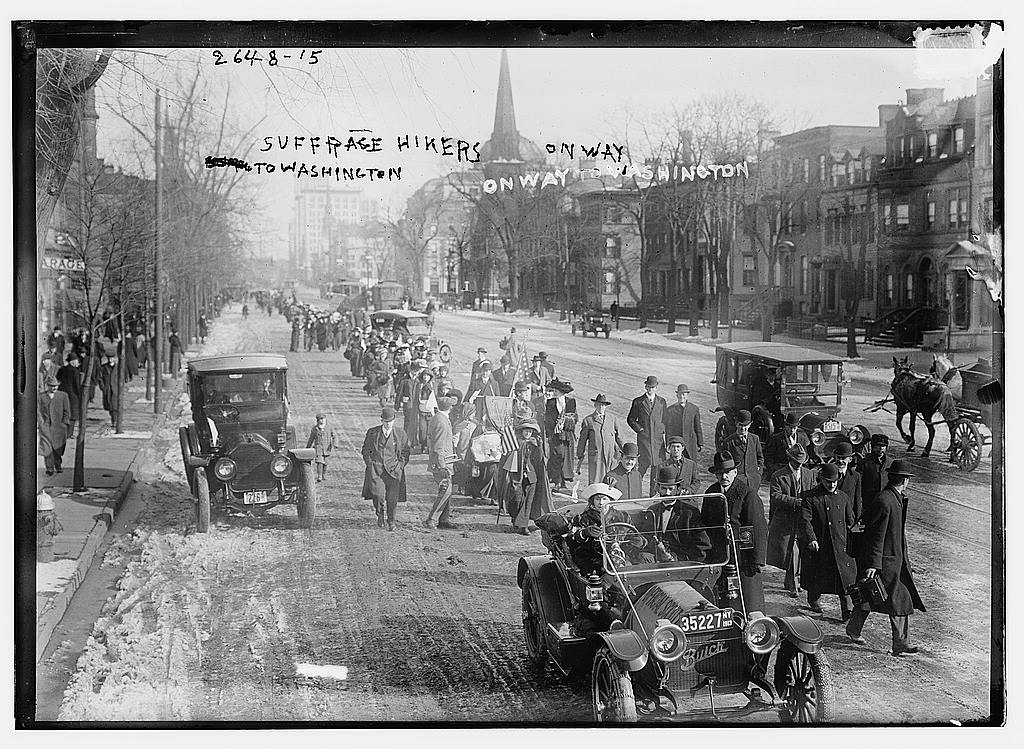
Suffrage hikers in Newark, New Jersey, in 1913

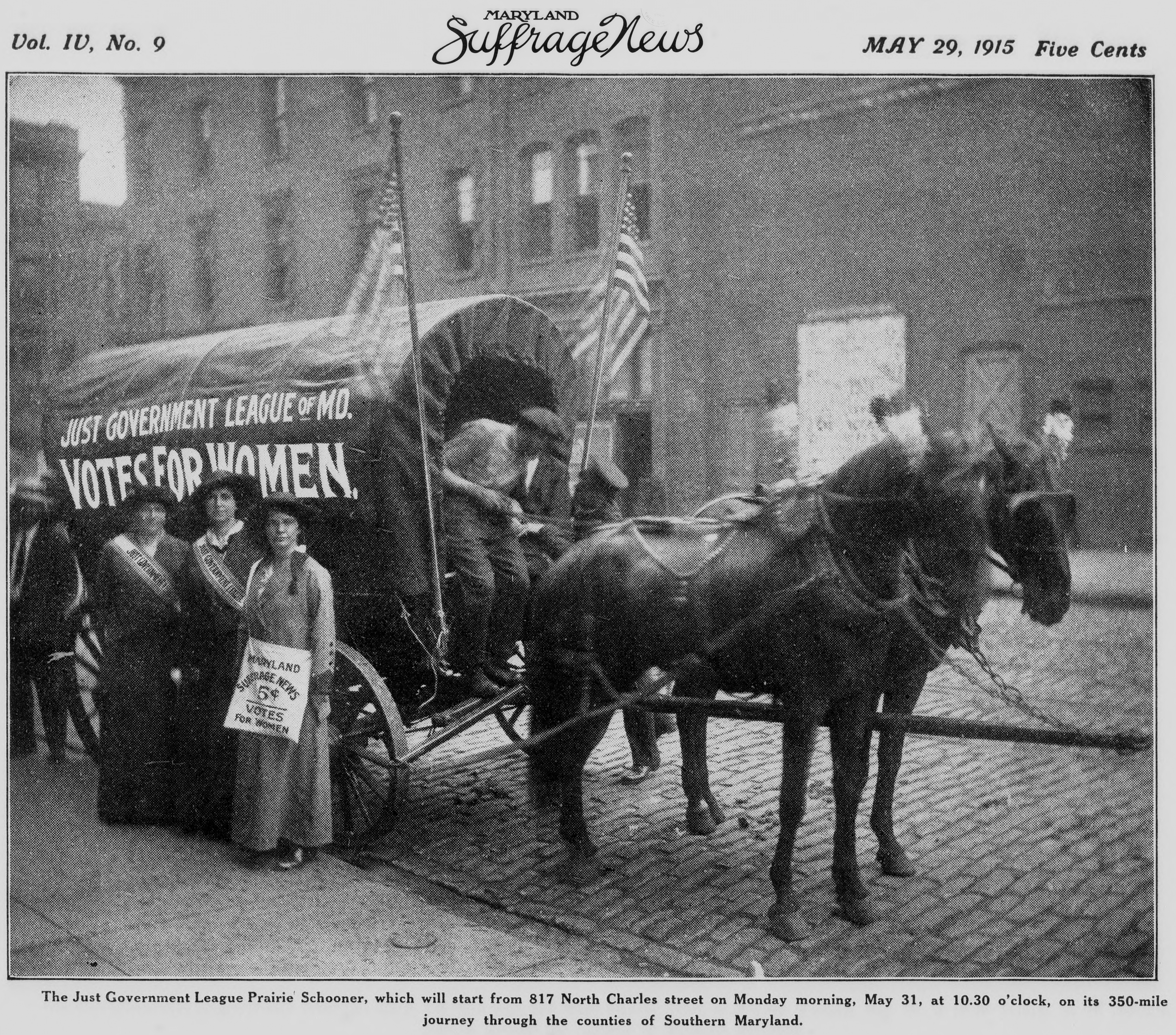
Margaret Brent Pilgrimage in Baltimore, in 1915

The Suffrage Hikes of 1912 to 1914 brought attention to the issue of women's suffrage. Florence Gertrude de Fonblanque organised the first from Edinburgh to London. Within months Rosalie Gardiner Jones had organized the first American one which left from The Bronx to Albany, New York. The second hike was from New York City to Washington, D.C., and covered 230 miles in 17 days.

== American participants ==
The major participants of the hikes, and the ones who covered the entire distance, were reporter Emma Bugbee, Ida Craft (nicknamed The Colonel), Elisabeth Freeman, and Rosalie Gardiner Jones, who was known as The General.

== 1912 Suffrage Hike to Albany ==
It began on Monday morning at 9:40 am, December 16, 1912, and left from the 242nd Street subway station in The Bronx where about 500 women had gathered. About 200, including the newspaper correspondents, started to walk north. The march continued for thirteen days, through sun and rain and snow covering a distance of 170 miles, including detours for speeches. The first 5 pilgrims walked into Albany at 4:00 pm, December 28, 1912.

== 1913 Suffrage Hike to Washington ==
=== Itinerary ===
- Hudson Terminal in New York City departure on February 12, 1913 at 9:00 am
- Newark, New Jersey
- Elizabeth, New Jersey
- Rahway, New Jersey
- Metuchen, New Jersey, arrived on night of February 12, 1913, and stayed in a hotel (about 28 miles)
- Wilmington, Delaware, arrived on February 18. Greeted by the mayor, had horse, Lausanne, checked out by a vet, and given a kitten as a mascot.
- New Brunswick
- Princeton
- Trenton
- Philadelphia
- Overlea, Maryland, Baltimore
- Laurel, Maryland - Arrived February 26 sent a parcel with a flag and message ahead to President-elect Wilson. A colored women's suffrage group attempts to join but is put off by the townspeople's claims of "trouble" and Rosalie Jones who says "none could join at this late date"
- Washington, District of Columbia arrival (about 225 miles)
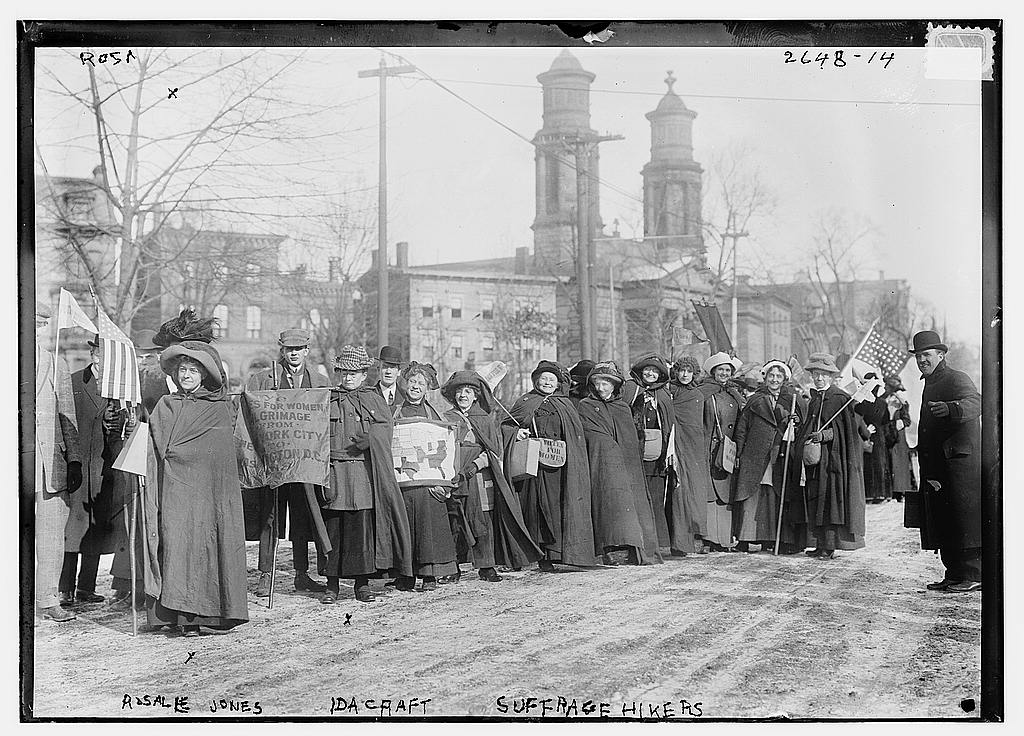
Rosalie Gardiner Jones and Ida Craft

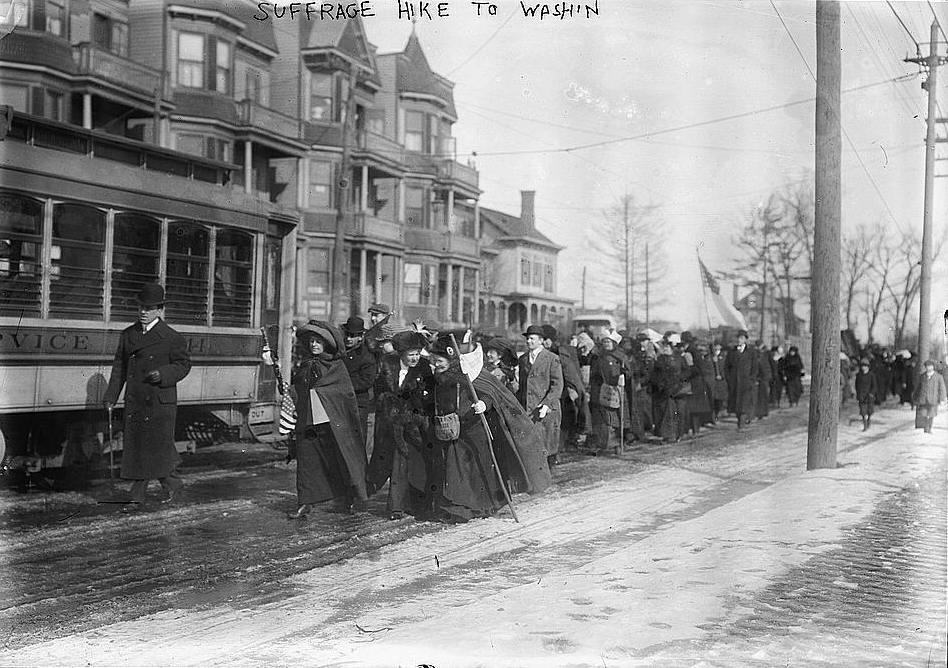
Suffrage hikers in Newark, New Jersey, in 1913

== See also ==
- Great Pilgrimage, suffragist march in Britain 1913
- Mohandas Gandhi's Salt March
- List of suffragists and suffragettes
- List of women's rights activists
- Selma to Montgomery marches
- Silent Sentinels
- Timeline of women's suffrage
- Woman Suffrage Procession, 1913
- Padayatra
