= Margaret Milne Farquharson =

Scottish suffragette and MP candidate

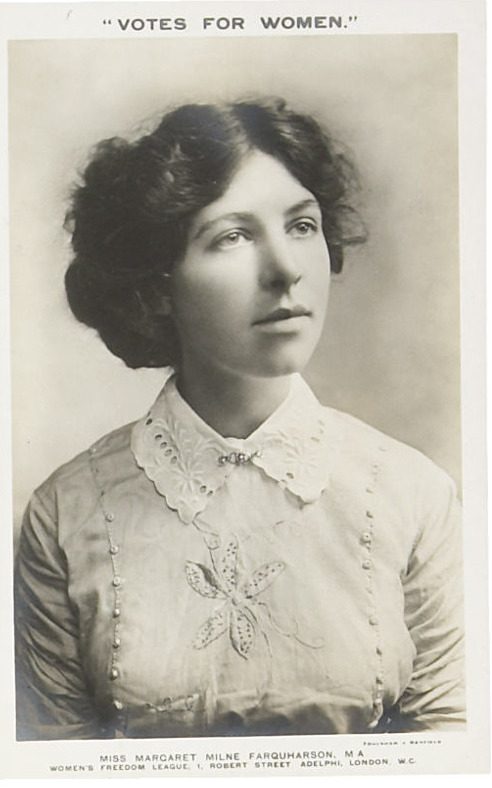
- Born: 17 August 1884
- Died: after 1936
- Education: University of Glasgow
- Occupation: activist
- Known for: suffragette, political leader

Margaret Milne McConnachie Farquharson (17 August 1884 – after 1936) was a Scottish suffragette, candidate for MP, leader of the National Political League and campaigner for Palestine.

== Life ==
Farquharson was born in 1884 and graduated in 1908 with a master's degree from the University of Glasgow.

She came to notice before the First World War as a leader in the women's suffrage movement. In 1909, she was arrested as a suffragette and jailed for five days in Holloway Prison. She was a salaried organiser for the Women's Freedom League in Liverpool with Mary Adelaide Broadhurst. However, the WFL failed to establish a voice distinct from the Women's Social and Political Union. Money was requested for a full-time organiser in Liverpool, but the salaried posts in Liverpool were not supported after January 1909.

In 1911 the National Political League (NPL) was formed, led by Broadhurst, its president. It was an apolitical group supporting reform. The suffragette and funder Janie Allan, the socialist Ethel Annakin Snowden, the suffragette Laura Ainsworth, MP George Lansbury and the labour union official John Scurr were supporters. Broadhurst was its secretary, and the league was based in St James's Street, in London. In 1913, it organised a meeting at Kingsway Hall, where 1,500 people, including George Bernard Shaw, attended to discuss and protest the force-feeding of hunger-striking suffragettes. The meeting was reported word for word to the Home Office.

During the war, the league had created the National Land Council, a body that created eleven locations in Britain for women to be trained to work on the land. The National Political League changed its name in 1917 to the National Political Reform League. In 1918, Farquharson was one of the first women to stand (unsuccessfully) to be a Member of Parliament.

By 1922, the league had aligned with supporting the Palestinians and the Arabs in general. It would appear that the leage supported the Arab cause, as it objected to the British governments support for Zionism. It also resisted the rise of Bolshevism. From March to May 1930, the British police kept her and the antisemite fascist Robert Gordon Canning under observation to monitor their interactions with a delegation sent to London by the executive committee of the Palestine Arab Congress (ECPAC).

The league was funded by leading Muslims, and British cabinet members were advised to avoid it. The league tried to undermine or overturn the Balfour Declaration. Broadhurst died in 1928. From 1929, the league continued its work and was in touch with the Muslim–Christian Alliance of Palestine.

A 1937 report intelligence report noted, "Miss Margaret Milne Farquharson [was] obtaining money from affluent Indians and Arabs". She was using the money to support the Pan-Islamists' and Palestians' point of view.
