= Mary Broadhurst =

British agricultural reformer and radical (1860–1928)

- Born: Mary Adelaide Broadhurst; 23 May 1860; Chorlton-on-Medlock, England
- Died: 8 December 1928 (aged 68); South Kensington, London, England
- Known for: Women's suffrage; women's employment in agriculture; President, National Political League

Mary Adelaide Broadhurst (23 May 1860 – 8 December 1928) was a British agricultural reformer and radical. She was a leading suffragette who founded the National Land Council which trained women during the First World War to work on the land. After the war, she championed the rights of Palestinians and resisted the rise of Bolshevism.

== Life ==
Broadhurst was born in Chorlton-on-Medlock in 1860. Her parents were Maria (born Hutchinson) and William Broadhurst, and she was their eldest child. Her father was a city councillor in Manchester, a bookkeeper and an accountant. She was awarded an MA degree by the University of London and then taught at Liverpool Ladies' College. In 1880, she moved to Glasgow and worked as a science teacher at the Park School for Girls, Glasgow. She aimed to introduce practical laboratory study in the physical sciences and in 1882 also joined the Glasgow Natural History Society.

Broadhurst's public life began as a leader in the women's suffrage movement. She and Margaret Milne Farquharson had been the salaried Liverpool organisers for the Women's Freedom League, but it failed to establish a voice distinct from the Women's Social and Political Union despite campaigning. Money was requested for a full-time organiser, but the post was not supported after January 1909.

In 1911, she formed the National Political League, an apolitical group supporting reform. She was its president until her death. The suffragette and funder Janie Allan, the socialist Ethel Annakin Snowden, the suffragette Laura Ainsworth, MP George Lansbury and the labour union official John Scurr were supporters. She was the president, and Farquharson was the secretary, and the NPL was based in St James's Street, in London.

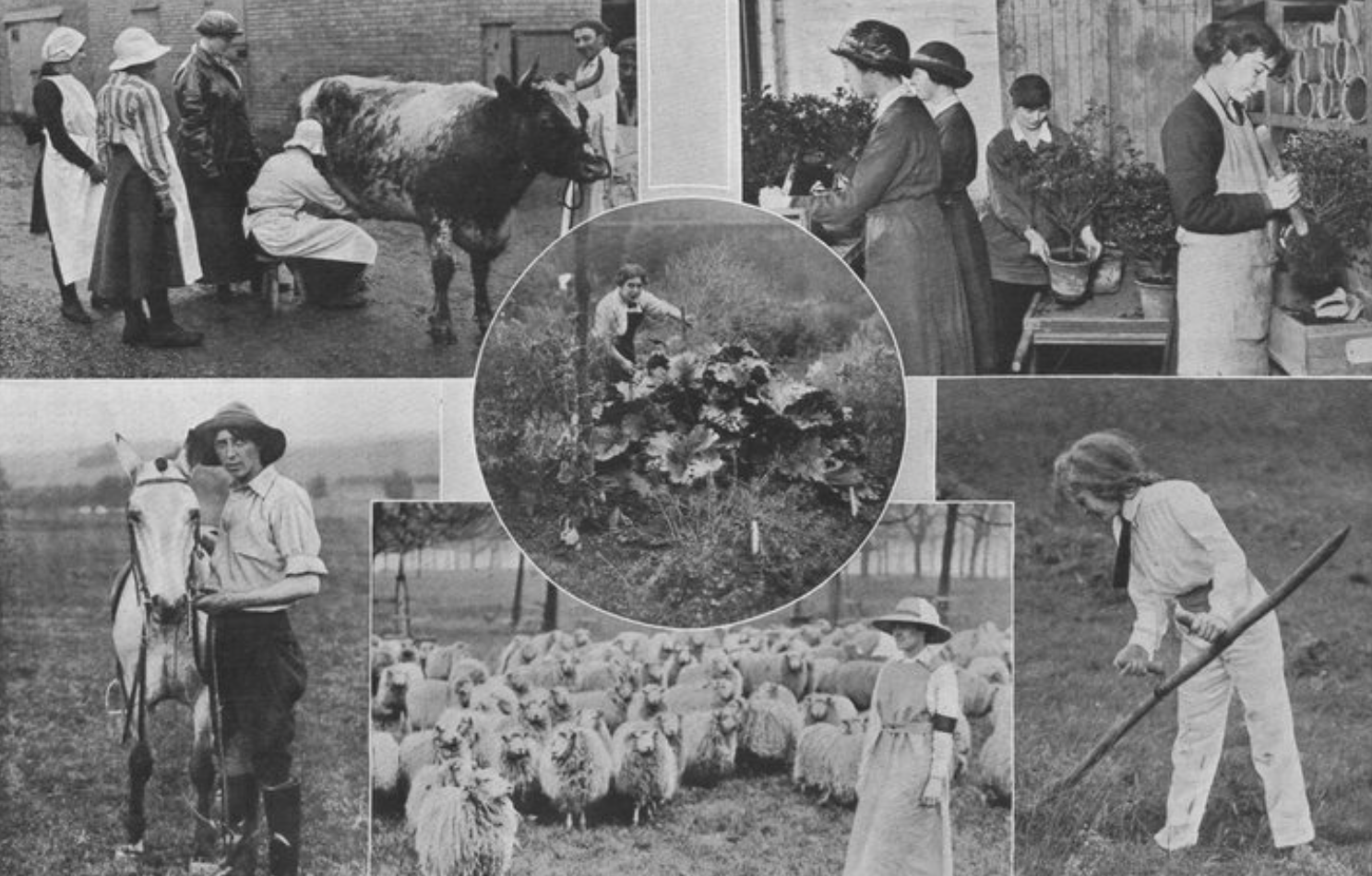
Women being trained by the National Land Council in 1916

During the war, the league created the National Land Council, a body that created eleven locations in Britain for women to be trained to work on the land.

The National Political League changed its name in 1917 to the National Political Reform League. By 1922, the league had aligned itself with supporting the Palestinians and the Arabs in general. Broadhurst wrote a nationalistic letter to The Times and the British Parliament. It would appear that the league supported the Arab cause, as it objected to the British government's support for Zionism. The league wanted to resist that and the rise of Bolshevism.

The NPL was funded by leading Muslims, and government cabinet members were advised to avoid it. The league was trying to undermine or overturn the Balfour Declaration. Broadhurst died in 1928. From 1929, the league continued its work and was in touch with the Muslim–Christian Alliance of Palestine.
