= Elizabeth Thomson (suffragist) =

Scottish suffragette (1847–1918)

- Born: 14 September 1847; Glasgow, Scotland
- Died: 1918 (aged 70–71); Edinburgh, Scotland
- Occupation: Suffragette
- Known for: Activism, arson attempt
- Criminal penalty: 3 months imprisonment (released before full term)
- Relatives: Agnes Thomson (sister)
- Honours: Hunger Strike Medal

Elizabeth Thomson (14 September 1847 – 1918) was a Scottish suffragette and a member of the Edinburgh branch of the Women's Social and Political Union (WSPU). She was arrested for her involvement in WSPU protests in Scotland and London alongside her sister, Agnes. The sisters were involved in the first arson attempt in Scotland as part of the WSPU arson campaign in 1913. Elizabeth was awarded a Hunger Strike Medal 'for valour' by the WSPU.

== Early life ==
Elizabeth Thomson was born on 14 September 1847 in Glasgow to Margaret Agnes Thomson and Robert Dundas Thomson, M.D, a physician.

At age 11, in 1848, Thomson began attending the independent day school Queen's College, London.

In 1866, Thomson briefly lived in Geneva, Switzerland – returning two years later to England to live in Richmond.

By 1881, both Thomson sisters had moved with their widowed mother to Hartington Place in Edinburgh. The 1881 census further records the three women as living on "income from [the] interest of money".

== Career ==
=== Missions ===
Throughout the 1890s and 1900s, Thomson travelled the world with her sister, Agnes, working as teachers and missionaries, subsequently spending 18 years in India. In 1909, both Elizabeth and Agnes travelled back to the UK to settle in Edinburgh.

=== Suffrage ===
In June 1909, aged 61, Thomson was present at Edinburgh's Synod Hall where Emmeline Pankhurst, women's suffrage campaigner and leader of the Women's Social and Political Union was speaking. Following this, both Elizabeth and Agnes joined the WSPU, during a meeting in Melville Place, where Adela Pankhurst, daughter of Emmeline, gave a speech.

In October 1909, a large protest for women's suffrage took place in Edinburgh, marching along Princes Street. The following autumn, 1910, Thomson travelled to London to join the Pankhursts in their increasingly physical fight for women's right to vote. On 18 November 1910, the infamous clash between suffrage campaigners and police officers, known as Black Friday, took place on the streets of London. Thomson describes the day in her autobiography, noting that she was hurt by a man who hit her back, but that the other women involved were "so careful not to hurt each other" in the crush of bodies. Despite her increasing age and the violence involved, Thomson continued to campaign for the WSPU in London. In 1911, she was held at Cannon Row Police Station for throwing stones at government buildings on Gt Smith Street. In 1912 she was imprisoned in Holloway Gaol for one month for her part in a suffrage protest.

In 1912 and 1913, Thomson travelled throughout Scandinavia, returning to live in Edinburgh in 1913.

==== Attempted arson and prison sentence ====
Her WSPU efforts continued, and on 5 April 1913, aged 65, the "elderly sisters", along with fellow Edinburgh WSPU members Arabella Scott and Edith Hudson, travelled to Kelso racecourse and attempted to burn down a stand. The four women were arrested along with Donald McEwan, who had ordered the taxi from Edinburgh, and subsequently tried in Jedburgh Court on 19 May. The jury found the charges against Agnes (then 67) were 'not proven' and recommended leniency for Elizabeth (then 65). Elizabeth was sentenced to three months while the others each received nine-month sentences. They were sent to Calton Jail where the women immediately went on a hunger strike. She was later released under the so-called 'Cat and Mouse Act' as a result of her hunger strike.

== Later life and death ==
On 31 May 1913 – against court orders – Thomson fled Edinburgh for Germany. Edinburgh court records from the National Records of Scotland, show that on 27 May 1913, the police claimed to "of course know where they [Elizabeth Thomson and Arabella Scott] are living" [sic?] but admitted on 13 June 1913, that "the police have no information to the present whereabouts of Elizabeth Thomson and Edith Hudson and are continuing their search for them". The police did not find Thomson and she spent the winter of 1913 in San Sebastian, Spain, before travelling to London in May 1914.

Thomson died in March 1918 at 15 Hartington Place, Edinburgh, aged 70 years old.

== See also ==
- Jessie C. Methven
- Alice Maud Shipley
