= Harrow =

Harrow may refer to:

== Places ==
- Harrow, Victoria, Australia
- Harrow, Ontario, Canada
- The Harrow, County Wexford, a village in Ireland
- London Borough of Harrow, England
- Harrow, London, a town in London
- Harrow (UK Parliament constituency)
- Harrow (electoral division), Greater London Council
- Harrow Road, an electoral ward of the City of Westminster
- Harrow on the Hill
- Harrow, Caithness, a hamlet in Scotland

== Schools ==
- Harrow School, independent school in Harrow, London, founded 1572
- Harrow College, college in Harrow, London, founded 1999
- Harrow High School, secondary school in Harrow, London
- Harrow District High School, Ontario, Canada
- Harrow International School Bangkok
- Harrow International School Beijing
- Harrow International School Hong Kong
- Harrow International School New York

== Other uses ==
- Harrow (surname)
- Harrow (tool), an agricultural implement
- Harrow (novel), a 2021 novel by Joy Williams
- Harrow (TV series), a 2018 Australian television series
- Harrow football, a football style played at Harrow School
- Harrow History Prize, a prize for children at British preparatory schools
- Harrow RFC, a rugby club
- Harrow Road, a road in London
- Battle of the Harrow, a battle of the Irish Rebellion of 1798
- Harrow, a playable character in Warframe
- Harrow, a size of cricket bat
- The Harrow, a fantasy and horror magazine
- The Harrow, London, a pub in central London
- The Harrow, Steep, a pub in Hampshire, England

== See also ==
- Handley Page Harrow (disambiguation)
- The Harrow & the Harvest, a 2011 album by Gillian Welch
- Harrow Central (disambiguation)
- Harrow Green, Suffolk, England
- Harrow Weald, part of the London Borough
- North Harrow
- South Harrow
- West Harrow
- Harrow Hill, West Sussex, an archaeological site in England
