= Edith Hudson =

British nurse and suffragette (born 1872)

- Born: 1872
- Died: Unknown
- Occupation: Nurse
- Years active: 1909–1913
- Movement: Women's Social and Political Union, women's suffrage

Edith Hudson (born 1872) was a British nurse and suffragette. She was an active member of the Edinburgh branch of the Women's Social and Political Union (WSPU) and was arrested several times for her part in their protests in Scotland and London. She engaged in hunger strikes while in prison and was forcibly fed. She was released after the last of these strikes under the so-called Cat and Mouse Act. Hudson was awarded a Hunger Strike Medal 'for Valour' by the WSPU.

== Early life and career ==
Hudson was born in 1872. By 1891 she was living with her mother and siblings in Glasgow in the census records, and in 1901 census she is working as a hospital nurse at Western Infirmary, Glasgow. She gave up her profession to dedicate herself to the women’s suffrage movement.

== Campaign for women's suffrage ==
Hudson was an active member of the Edinburgh branch of the Women's Social and Political Union and engaged in protests in Scotland and London. She hosted meetings of the Edinburgh WSPU at her home in Melville Place. She was arrested for the first time in Edinburgh in December 1909 at a demonstration where Liberal MP Sir Edward Grey was delivering a speech. Hudson addressed a large crowd before making her way to the theatre and becoming engaged in scuffles with police who were blocking the way.

She was charged with committing a breach of the peace and pled guilty, but claimed her actions were “purely political” and necessary as “the Government at present had refused to hear any questions about women’s franchise that were put in a constitutional and peaceful manner.” She was given a £5 fine or 30 days' imprisonment. Hudson opted to go to prison and was removed to Calton Jail with a fellow suffragette Elsie Roe-Brown. Members of the Edinburgh WSPU gathered at the walls of Calton Jail to give them “an encouraging cheer”.

She was involved in an incident at Louth Town Hall at Louth in Lincolnshire in 1910, when during a speech being given by the then Chancellor of the Exchequer and future Prime Minister, David Lloyd George, she and Bertha Brewster conducted a protest and were arrested.

On 21 November 1911, Hudson was among the 223 protesters arrested at a WSPU demonstration at the House of Commons, to which she had travelled with other women from the Edinburgh branch, including Jessie C. Methven, Alice Shipley, Elizabeth and Agnes Thomson and Mrs N Grieve. The demonstrations followed the "torpedoing" of the Conciliation Bill, meant to extend the right to vote to wealthy, property-owning women. Hudson had previously been arrested in London in November 1910.

=== Hunger strikes ===
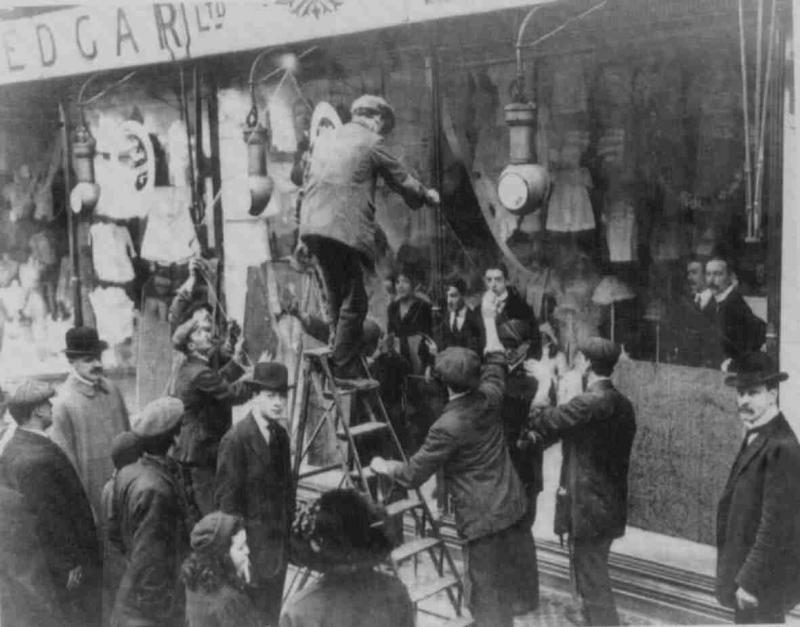
suffragette window smashing campaign

In March 1912, Hudson took part in a militant protest which involved concerted window-smashing in London over three days.

Scottish participants were assigned Kensington High Street. Hudson was arrested, sentenced and sent to Holloway prison. While she was serving her sentence, Emmeline and Christabel Pankhurst were charged with conspiracy and imprisoned in Holloway in April 1912. Suffragette prisoners were instructed by the WSPU to go on hunger strike to protest Mrs Pankhurst's sentence. A fellow Scottish prisoner, Lilias Mitchell, described the forcible feeding of the hunger strikers as "a sort of hell for two hours" and reported that Hudson "fought splendidly - knocked down all the six wardresses & told the doctor what she thought of him!" Mrs Pankhurst was released the following day. All the released prisoners were presented with an "illuminated address" designed by Sylvia Pankhurst and signed by Emmeline.

In May 1913 Hudson was charged with attempting to set fire to Kelso Racecourse stand, along with Arabella Scott and Elizabeth and Agnes Thomson, and, at Jedburgh Sheriff Court, was sentenced to nine months imprisonment in Calton Jail. The women immediately went on hunger strike. After seven days, Hudson and the other female prisoners were released under The Prisoners (Temporary Discharge for Ill Health) Act 1913, also known as the Cat and Mouse Act, which had recently been introduced to allow prisons to release women whose hunger strike had reached a critical stage. They were released on licence, to return when their health improved. No attempt had been made to forcibly feed them.

After her release Hudson stayed at the home of Dr Grace Cadell, which was used as a refuge for suffragettes. She was interviewed there by a journalist who described her as "a woman of fine physique" who would soon be fit enough to return to Calton for "further martyrdom". None of the women returned to prison when their licenses expired and Hudson subsequently “vanished”.

Like many suffragettes at the time, Hudson used an alias to evade the police and went by Mary Brown. For this reason it is likely that she is noted twice on the Roll of Honour of Suffragette Prisoners. She was remembered by a fellow suffragette as "about the most gentle person I knew".

== See also ==
- List of suffragists and suffragettes
- Women's Social and Political Union
- Timeline of women's suffrage
