= Twyla Exner =

Canadian artist

Twyla Exner is a Canadian contemporary artist and assistant teaching professor at Thompson Rivers University in Kamloops, Secwepemcúl̓ecw in British Columbia. She creates art works in various mediums, including drawing, sculpture, ceramics, and installation. Exner's pieces explore themes of nature, combined with technology and electronics, and have been exhibited across Canada. She previously worked as the director of Public Programs at Two Rivers Gallery.

== Education ==
Exner studied at the University of Regina, receiving her Bachelor of Fine Arts in sculpture in 2004. She then went on to complete a Master of Fine Arts in studio arts from Concordia University in 2010.

== Career ==
In addition to TRU, Exner has also taught at Grande Prairie Regional College in Grande Prairie, Alberta. She was a part of the Saskatchewan arts community as a curator, writer, art juror, mentor, and artist. In 2014, Exner was selected to exhibit her work at the Art Gallery of Algoma, based on the high quality of her work, and also her willingness to engage with the community by teaching workshops, and giving artists talks. The event was covered by Shaw TV.

Exner has received grants from the Saskatchewan Arts Board (2006, 2009, 2011, 2012). She is a member of CARFAC.

== Work ==
Exner creates hands-on, labour-intensive sculptures. Some of her work is made by weaving together salvaged electronic components, like wires and circuits. She also makes detailed drawings that connote themes of invention; merging technology and biology.

Exner's work has been exhibited across Canada. In 2013 and 2014, her work became part of the Organization of Saskatchewan Arts Councils' touring show, Creative Play: Saskatchewan Arts Board 65th Anniversary Exhibition. Her work is in private collections, and the collection of the Saskatchewan Arts Board.

Exner used the materials and imagery associated with electronics, and explores the concept of a sublime technological environment where electronic devices become unpredictable and evolve in a manner resembling living organisms.

== Exhibitions ==
Exner has shown her art works in a number of solo and group exhibitions across Canada, including the art gallery of St Albert, the Campbell River Art Gallery, the Vernon Public Art Gallery, the ODD Gallery, and the Cube Gallery.

=== Solo exhibitions ===
- 2020 – Cling, Cube Gallery at Kamloops Art Gallery, Kamloops BC.
- 2018 – Send & Receive | Arnica Artist-Run Centre | Kamloops, BC.
- 2017 – Technological Wanders, Art Gallery of Saint Albert, Saint Albert, AB.
- 2015 – Structure of a Substance: Cluster, Campbell River Art Gallery, Campbell River, BC.
- 2014 – Systems & Things, Vernon Public Art Gallery, Vernon, BC.
- 2012 – Entangled, Odd Gallery (KIAC), Dawson City, YT.

=== Group exhibitions ===
- 2019 – Curiosity Collider: Invasive Systems | VIVO | Vancouver, BC.
- 2018 – Remembering Mr. LeBlonde | Last Mountain Lake Cultural Centre | Regina Beach, SK.
- 2018 – Send & Receive | The Works Art & Design Festival | Edmonton, AB.
- 2017 – Colour | Hill Tower | Saskatchewan Arts Board Collection Exhibition | Curator: Belinda Harrow | Regina, SK.
- 2016 – Visual Arts Faculty Biennial, Thompson Rivers University Gallery, Kamloops, BC.
- 2014 –Creative Play: Saskatchewan Arts Board 65th Anniversary Exhibition, program for ten Saskatchewan venues.
- 2010 – Detritus Ecologies, Gallery 101, Ottawa, ON.
