= Harrow (surname) =

Harrow is a surname meaning a person who harrowed the land. Notable people with the surname include:

- Alix E. Harrow (born 1989), American science-fiction author
- Andy Harrow (born 1956), Scottish former football player
- Aram Harrow (born 1980), American quantum information theorist
- Belinda Harrow (born 1971), New Zealand artist
- Benjamin Harrow (1888–1970), American biochemist, nutritionist and writer
- Jack Harrow (1888-1958), English footballer
- Judy Harrow (1945–2014), American author, counselor, lecturer, and Wiccan priestess
- Lisa Harrow (born 1943), New Zealand actress
- Nancy Harrow (born 1930), American jazz singer
- Ryan Harrow (born 1991), American professional basketball player
- William Harrow (1822–1872), lawyer and controversial Union general in the American Civil War

Fictional characters:

- Jonas Harrow, an enemy of Spider-Man in the Marvel Comics universe
- Richard Harrow, a WWI soldier turned contract killer in the HBO series Boardwalk Empire
