= Harrow Central =

Harrow Central may refer to:

- Harrow Central (electoral division), former Greater London Council electoral division
- Harrow Central (UK Parliament constituency), former constituency

== See also ==
- Harrow Central Mosque
- Harrow (disambiguation)
