= Jedburgh Sheriff Court =

Judicial building in Jedburgh, Scotland

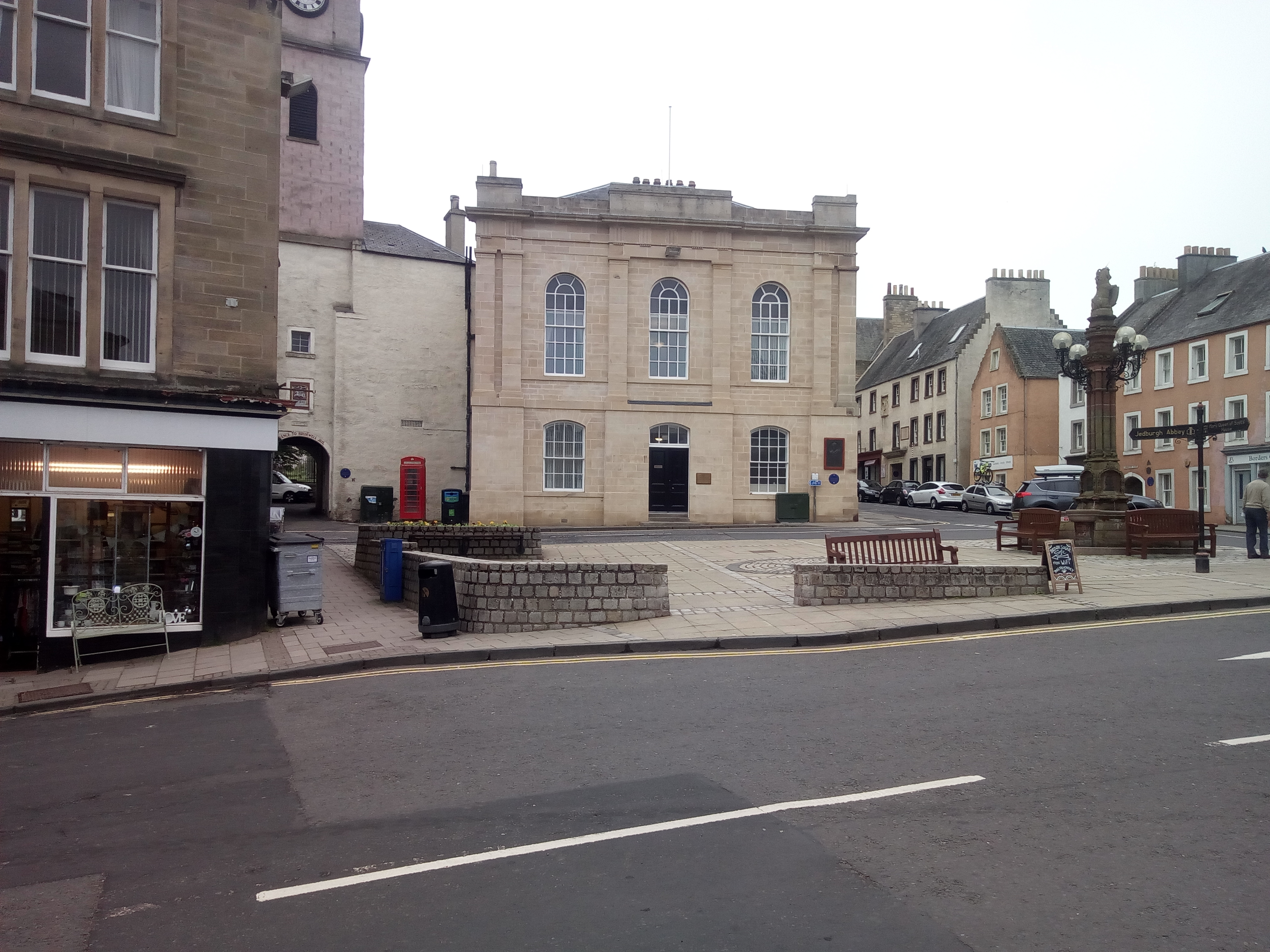
- The building in 2018

- Shown within the Scottish Borders
- 55.4774°N 2.5556°W
- Location: Market Square, Jedburgh

History
- Built: 1812

Site notes
- Architectural style: Neoclassical style

Listed Building – Category B
- Official name: Jedburgh Sheriff Court and Justice Of The Peace Court (Former County Buildings) including wall and railings, Castlegate, Jedburgh
- Designated: 16 March 1971
- Reference no.: LB35503

Jedburgh Sheriff Court, formerly County Buildings, is a judicial building in the Market Square in Jedburgh in Scotland. The building, which continues to be used as a courthouse, is a Category B listed building.

== History ==
The first building on the southwest side of the Market Square was a town house, which dated back to 1664. A gatehouse to Jedburgh Abbey, with tower and spire, was erected to the south of the building and initially deployed as a prison, in 1755. It was in the old town house that Sir Walter Scott worked as a young advocate in 1793. By the early 19th century, old town house was dilapidated and the Commissioners of Supply decided to commission a new courthouse for the area. The new building was designed in the neoclassical style, built in ashlar stone and was completed in 1812.

The original design featured a symmetrical main frontage of nine bays facing onto Castle Gate. The central section of three bays, which was slightly projected forward, featured a three-bay arcaded porch with a balustraded parapet. There were three sash windows on the first floor, with recessed panels above. The outer sections were fenestrated with sash windows on the ground floor, and featured niches flanked by sash windows on the first floor. There were single Doric order pilasters flanking the bays in the central section, and paired Doric order pilasters at the corners of the building, all supporting a frieze with triglyphs, a cornice and a parapet. Internally, the principal room was the courtroom on the first floor.

The gatehouse to the south ceased operating as a prison when Jedburgh Prison was completed in 1823. In the 19th century, the building, which became known as "County Buildings", served as the offices of the county officials for Roxburghshire and the local commissioners of supply, as well as being the venue for local hearings of the sheriff court.

The courthouse was remodelled to a design by David Rhind in 1861. The changes involved a new three-bay frontage facing onto the Market Square, as well as a new four-bay extension to the south, along Castle Gate, to create a new courtroom, which was decorated with a vaulted ceiling with ornate plasterwork and three cupolas. Queen Victoria visited the town and, accompanied by civic leaders, stood in front of the building as she reviewed a guard of honour drawn from the Roxburghshire and Selkirk (The Border) Rifle Volunteers in the Market Square in September 1867.

In May 1913, the building was the venue for the trial of the suffragettes, Arabella Scott, Elizabeth and Agnes Thomson and Edith Hudson, who were accused of trying to set fire to a racecourse stand at Kelso Racecourse. They were found guilty and sentenced to imprisonment. During the First World War, to protect local people from German bombing, the court rigorously enforced the blackout regulations, imposing fines or imprisoning anyone who breached them. A plaque, intended to commemorate the centenary of the death of Sir Walter Scott, was designed by Alexander Carrick and placed on the front of the building in 1932.

A major programme of refurbishment works, which involved the complete reconstruction of the Castle Gate porch, was completed in 1991, enabling the building to continue to serve as the venue for sheriff court hearings in the area.

== See also ==
- List of listed buildings in Jedburgh, Scottish Borders
