= Elizabeth and Agnes Thomson =

Scottish suffragette sisters

Elizabeth Thomson
- Born: 1847; Glasgow, Scotland
- Died: 1918 (aged 70–71)
- Occupation: Suffragette
- Known for: Arson attempt

Agnes Thomson
- Born: Agnes Colquhon Thomson; 1846; Glasgow, Scotland
- Died: Unknown
- Occupation: Suffragette
- Known for: Arson attempt

Elizabeth and Agnes Thomson were Scottish suffragettes and members of the Edinburgh branch of the Women's Social and Political Union. They were arrested for their involvement in WSPU protests in Scotland and London. The sisters were involved in the first arson attempt in Scotland as part of the WSPU arson campaign in 1913. Elizabeth was imprisoned for her role and went on hunger strike. She was later released under the Prisoners (Temporary Discharge for Ill Health) Act 1913, so-called Cat and Mouse Act. Elizabeth was awarded a Hunger Strike Medal 'for Valour' by the WSPU.

== Early life and career ==
Agnes Colquhoun Thomson was born in 1846 and Elizabeth Thomson in 1847, in Glasgow, Scotland. They subsequently moved, with their widowed mother Margaret, to Hartington Place in Edinburgh. The 1881 Census records the three women as living on "income from interest of money". The sisters subsequently spent 18 years in India "being engaged in mission work", before returning to Edinburgh.

== Campaign for women's suffrage ==
The Thomson sisters were active members of the Edinburgh WSPU and were involved in protests in London and Scotland. On 21 November 1911, they were among the 223 protesters arrested at a WSPU demonstration at the House of Commons, to which they had travelled with other women from the Edinburgh branch, including Jessie C. Methven, Edith Hudson, Alice Shipley and Mrs N Grieve. The demonstrations followed the "torpedoing" of the Conciliation Bill. They were both sentenced to five days' imprisonment in Holloway prison. Elizabeth served a further term in Holloway in May 1912.

=== Arson campaign ===
In April 1913 the "elderly sisters", along with fellow Edinburgh WSPU members Arabella Scott and Edith Hudson, travelled to Kelso racecourse and attempted to burn down a stand. The four women were arrested along with Donald McEwan, who had ordered the taxi from Edinburgh, and subsequently tried in Jedburgh Sheriff Court on 19 May. The jury found the charges against Agnes (then 67) were 'not proven' and recommended leniency for Elizabeth (then 65). Elizabeth was sentenced to three months while the others each received nine-month sentences. They were sent to Calton Jail where the women immediately went on a hunger strike.

=== The Cat and Mouse Act ===
The Prisoners (Temporary Discharge for Ill Health) Act 1913, also known as the Cat and Mouse Act, had recently been introduced which allowed prisons to release women whose hunger strike had reached a critical stage. Elizabeth was released under the act on 23 May on licence to return when her health improved. None of the women returned to prison when their licences expired and Leneman records that Elizabeth "vanished" after her release, no longer attending WSPU meetings as police actively sought her there.

Agnes continued to be active in the movement, and wrote to the Scottish Prison Service to intercede on Arabella Scott's behalf in August 1913 when she was rearrested under the Cat and Mouse Act at a WSPU protest in London and returned to Calton Jail.

== See also ==
- List of suffragists and suffragettes
- Timeline of women's suffrage
