= Louth Town Hall =

Municipal building in Louth, Lincolnshire, England

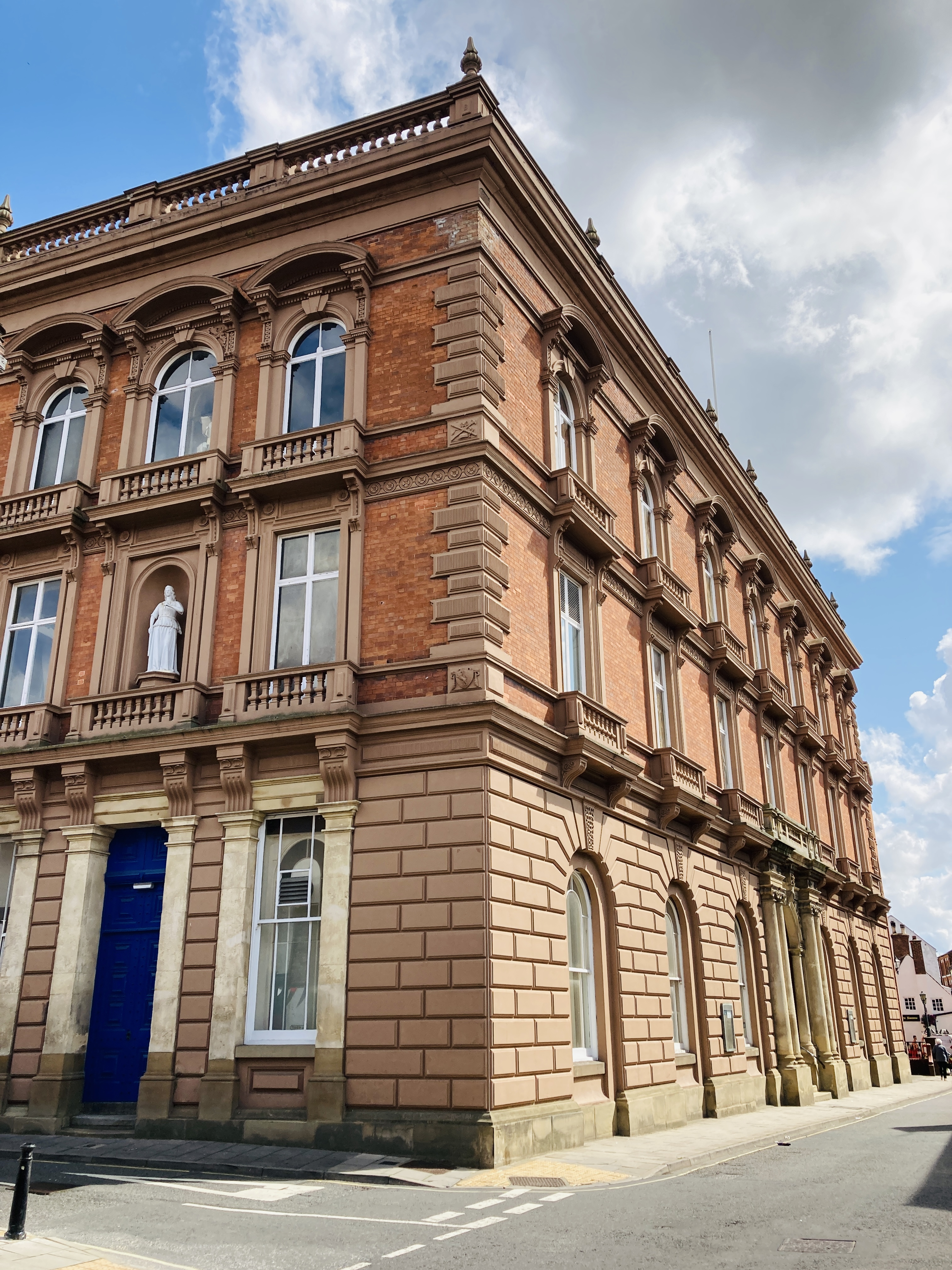
- Louth Town Hall

- Shown in Lincolnshire
- 53.3672°N 0.0049°W
- Location: Eastgate, Louth

History
- Built: 1854

Site notes
- Architect: Pearson Bellamy
- Architectural style: Palazzo style

Listed Building – Grade II
- Official name: Town Hall
- Designated: 18 February 1974
- Reference no.: 1063257

Louth Town Hall is a municipal building in Eastgate in Louth, Lincolnshire, England. The structure, which was the meeting place of Louth Borough Council, is a Grade II listed building.

== History ==
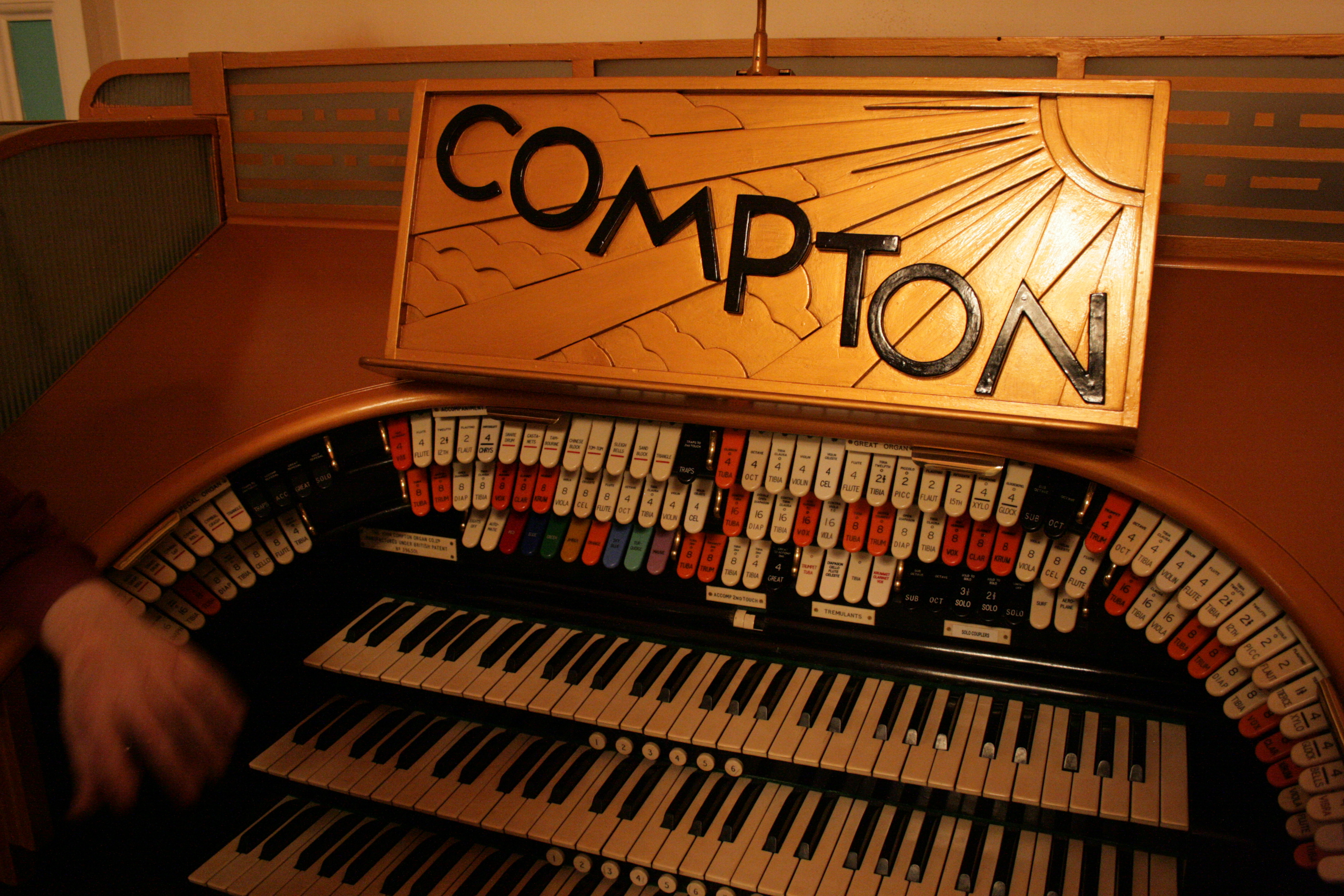
The theatre organ console in the town hall

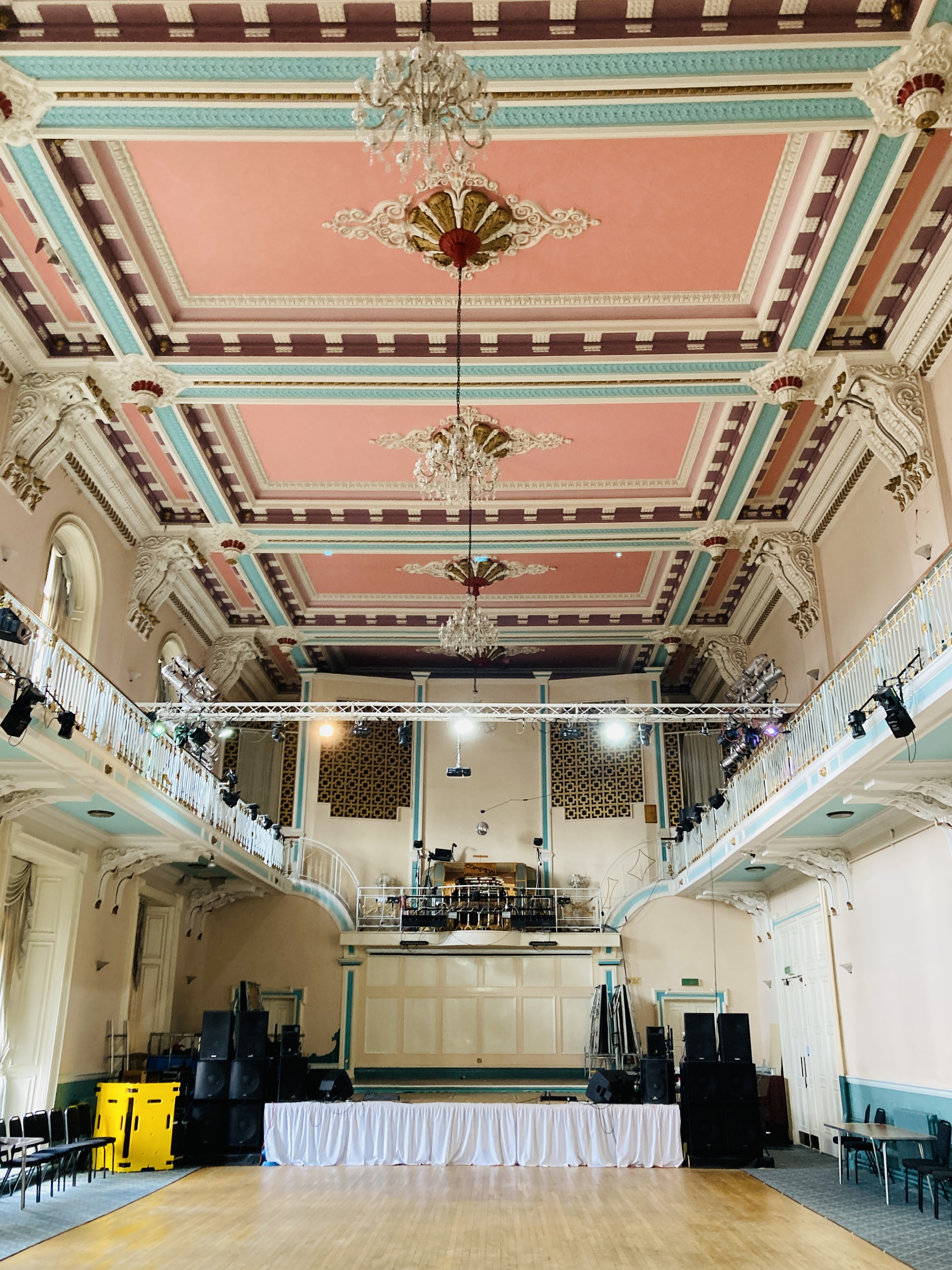
The Main Hall in 2023

The first town hall was a small square structure in Mercer Row which incorporated a lock-up for petty criminals and was completed in 1597. It was replaced by a building known as the Guildhall which was built in the Cornmarket at a cost of £1,460 and completed in 1815.

In the early 1850s, after finding the guildhall inadequate, civic leaders decided to procure a new town hall on a site known as the Stall Yard. The foundation stone for the new building was laid by the Earl of Yarborough on 16 June 1853. It was designed by Pearson Bellamy in the Palazzo style, built by a local contractor, John Dales, in red brick and ashlar stone at a cost of £5,927 and was completed in 1854. The design involved a symmetrical main frontage with seven bays facing onto Eastgate; there was a central round headed doorway flanked by pairs of Ionic order columns supporting an modillioned cornice; the other bays on the ground floor, which was rusticated, contained round head windows; on the first floor there was a series of sash windows each with a balustraded balcony and on the second floor there was a similar series of sash windows each with a balustrade balcony and also each with a segmental pediment. At roof level there was a cornice, a balustrade and a series of urns. On the western elevation there was a statue of Justice in a niche in the central bay on the first floor. Internally, the principal rooms were the ballroom and the council chamber.

There was an incident at the town hall in 1910, when during a speech being given by the then Chancellor of the Exchequer and future Prime Minister, David Lloyd George, two suffragettes, Edith Hudson and Bertha Brewster, conducted a protest and were arrested.

The town hall continued to serve as the headquarters of the borough council for much of the 20th century but ceased to be the local seat of government after the enlarged East Lindsey District Council which was formed in 1974. A theatre organ, designed and manufactured by John Compton and first installed in the Queen's Hall Cinema in Grimsby in 1935, was completely reconstructed and enhanced with parts from other organs and then installed in the town hall in 1975. The district council sold the ownership of the town hall to the not-for-profit Louth Education Community Interest Company in 2012 under the Community Asset Transfer process. Louth Town Council, which had continued to use the town hall as its meeting place, relocated to the Sessions House, further east along Eastgate at that time. The building now operates as a community support and events venue: performers have included the performance poet, John Cooper Clarke, in November 2017, the blues group, The Blues Band, in February 2018 and the band, Los Pacaminos, in February 2020.
