= Alice Maud Shipley =

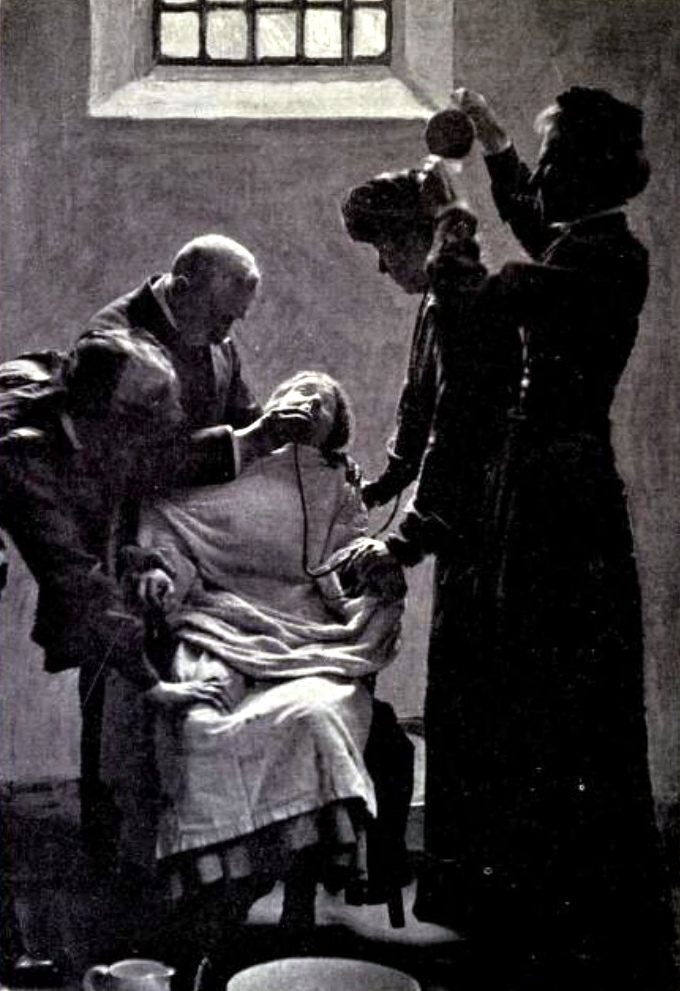
A suffragette being force-fed; Shipley endured this treatment in 1912 in Holloway Prison

Alice Maud Shipley (5 June 1869 – 16 December 1951) was a militant suffragette and member of the Women's Social and Political Union (WSPU) who received a prison sentence during which she went on hunger strike and was force-fed, for which action she received the WSPU's Hunger Strike Medal.

Born in Higham Ferrers in Northamptonshire in 1869, the eldest of three children born to Martha née Smith (1845-1876), a dressmaker, and Alfred George Shepherd Shipley (1844-1914), the foreman in a shoe manufactory and a Wesleyan lay evangelist, in 1891 she was a dressmaker like her mother, while by 1901 she was living in Dryfesdale in Dumfriesshire in Scotland as lady's maid to a Mrs Margaret Pairman.

On 21 November 1911 Shipley was among the 223 protesters arrested at a WSPU demonstration at the House of Commons, to which she had travelled with other women from the Edinburgh branch of the WSPU including Elizabeth and Agnes Thomson, Jessie C. Methven, Edith Hudson and a Mrs N Grieve. The demonstrations followed the "torpedoing" of the Conciliation Bill. She appeared at Bow Street Magistrates' Court after which she was released without charge. She was again arrested in West London in March 1912 during a window-smashing campaign in the West End of London following which she appeared at the London Sessions on 19 March 1912 where she refused to be bound over and received a four-month prison sentence in Holloway Prison.

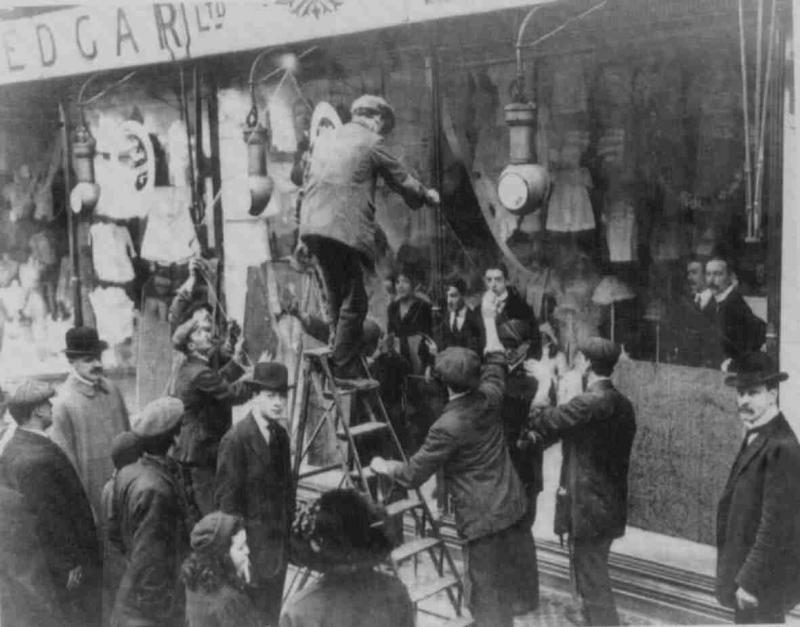
suffragette window smashing campaign

At her trial she stated:

"More than half my life I have been doing what lies in me to help the poor & unfortunate. As a member of a Vigilance Society, & as a worker in connection with other societies, I know the condition of our women & girls, & the dangers that lie about them & that they have no power to protect themselves; & that knowledge has made me take up the attitude I have today. I feel our case is a most urgent one, & I feel that only a woman can understand a woman’s needs, that women suffer for the want & care of men, & that their salvation lies in looking after their own needs & in demanding the vote".

In Holloway she went on hunger strike and was force-fed. In prison she was one of the suffragette co-signatories on The Suffragette Handkerchief, a symbol of defiance, organised by fellow prisoner who retained it until her death, Mary Ann Hilliard, On Shipley's release from prison at the end of June 1912, she received a Hunger Strike Medal 'for Valour' from the leaders of the WSPU.

Alice Maud Shipley died in Edinburgh in Scotland in 1951 and was buried in the family plot of the Pairman family in the churchyard of St Mary's church in Biggar, South Lanarkshire. Her inscription on the memorial reads: "Alice Maude Shipley faithful friend of the Pairman family for nearly 60y d. at Edinburgh 16.12.1951) Pairman".
