= South Ambersham =

Hamlet in West Sussex, England

Coordinates: 50.978°N 0.696°W

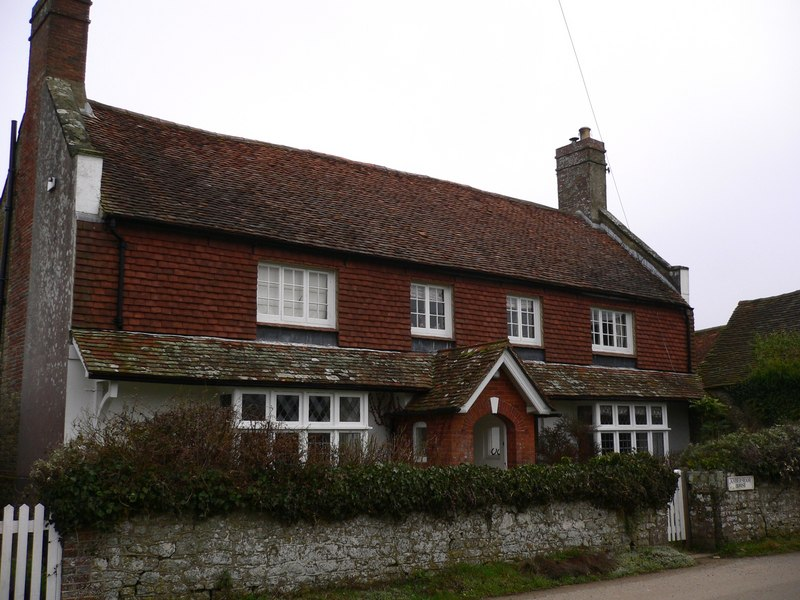
- Ambersham House

- Location within West Sussex
- OS grid reference: SU916206
- Civil parish: Graffham
- District: Chichester
- Shire county: West Sussex
- Region: South East
- Country: England
- Sovereign state: United Kingdom
- Police: Sussex
- Fire: West Sussex
- Ambulance: South East Coast
- UK Parliament: Chichester

South Ambersham is a hamlet and former civil parish, now in the parish of Graffham, in the Chichester district of West Sussex, England. It lies 0.7 miles (1.2 km) south of the A272 road and 2 miles (3.2 km) east of Midhurst. Until 1844 South Ambersham was a detached part of Hampshire and was a tithing of the parish of Steep, in 1844 it became a separate civil parish, until 1972 when it was abolished and merged with Graffham. In 1961 the parish had a population of 117.
