= Bertha Brewster =

British peace activist and suffragette

Bertha Brewster (27 May 1887 – 1 August 1959) was a British peace activist and suffragette who achieved fame with her letter to the Editor of The Daily Telegraph in February 1913. She was arrested five times, imprisoned twice and received the Hunger Strike Medal from the Women's Social and Political Union (WSPU).

== Early life ==
Brewster was born in Lewes in Sussex in 1887 to Bertha (born 1863) and George Rice Brewster (born 1860) of Henfield, near Horsham in West Sussex. Her father was of independent means. Her brother Philip Brewster was born in 1889. She and her brother were day students at the co-educational private school Bedales. The 1901 Census shows the Brewster family were residing in Steep, Hampshire, where the school was located. Academically able, she was one of two girls who, on leaving Bedales in 1905, attended the University of London; however, it does not appear that she ever graduated.

== Suffragette ==
In 1908 she and her mother joined the Women's Social and Political Union (WSPU), with Mrs Brewster later becoming the secretary of the Ombersley branch. Bertha Brewster was first arrested in August 1909 when she and a number of other suffragettes rented a house next door to a hall in Liverpool where Richard Haldane, a Liberal Member of Parliament and the Secretary of State for War was scheduled to speak at a meeting. When the meeting commenced one of the women climbed onto the roof of their rented house while another spoke to the crowd below. Press reports of the incident claimed that slates and other items were hurled from the roof of the house at the windows of the hall, resulting in Haldane having to interrupt his speech. On 24 August 1909 Brewster was sentenced to four weeks in prison, to be served at Walton Gaol, while the other women involved received eight weeks each. Brewster protested that her sentence was unduly lenient. The newspaper Votes for Women recorded that while being transported to prison the women sang La Marseillaise while waving a flag reading 'Votes for Women' from the roof of the prison van. Because the authorities did not recognise them as political prisoners the women went on hunger strike, refusing to eat for three days before being released after a further two days.

On their release from prison the suffragettes were charged with wilful damage of Walton Gaol, where it was claimed they had smashed windows. Brewster was charged with breaking 15 panes of glass in her cell, with a value of 3 shillings and 9 pence. The released women stated that they had already been punished for the damage to the windows and that they were willing to pay for the cost of repair. The authorities claimed that as Brewster had been ill in prison owing to her hunger strike she had been in no fit state to be punished. In September 1909 a summons was issued for her arrest, and Brewster's mother engaged a barrister to defend her daughter and to pay any damages. However, the judge at the hearing refused to listen to any representations from the barrister and issued a warrant for Brewster's arrest.

== Incident at Louth in Lincolnshire ==
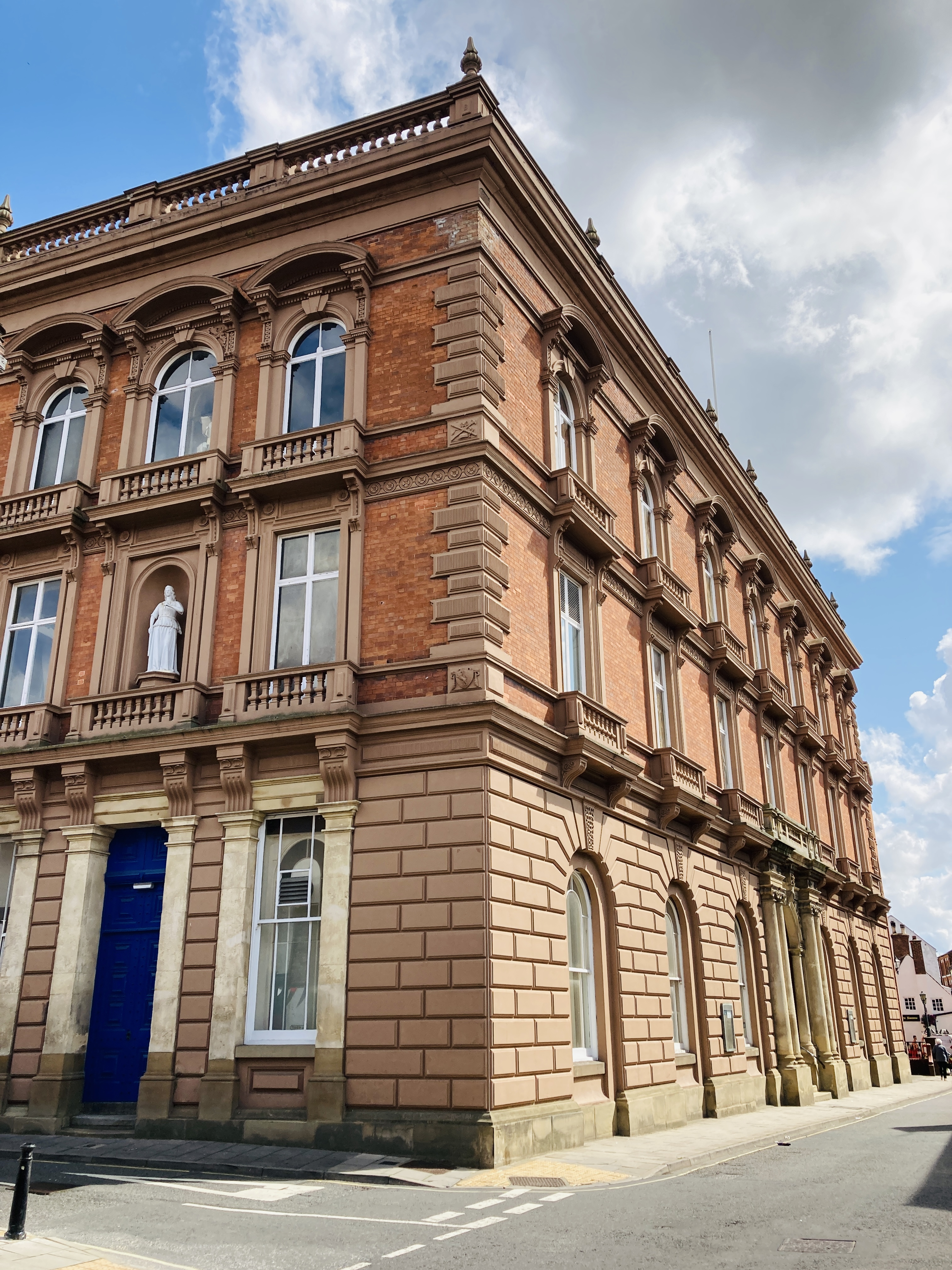
Louth Town Hall where in 1910 Brewster and Edith Hudson interrupted a speech by David Lloyd George

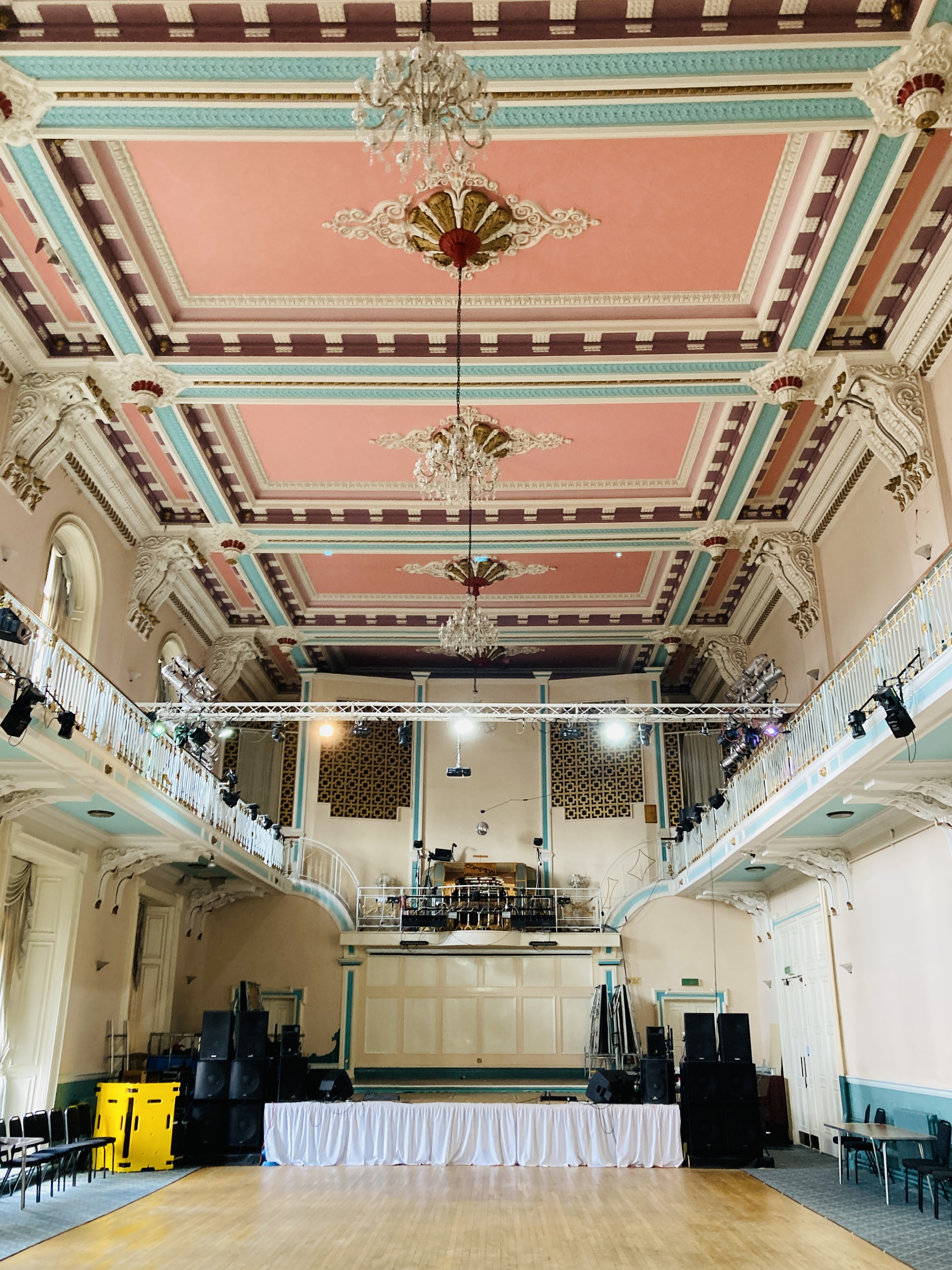
The Main Hall at Louth Town Hall. In 1910 the hall extended further back

Brewster was involved in an incident at Louth Town Hall in Louth in Lincolnshire in 1910 where she and fellow-suffragette Edith Hudson managed to hide for more than 24 hours in the loft space above the ballroom in anticipation of a speech being given there by the then Chancellor of the Exchequer and future Prime Minister, David Lloyd George. She and Hudson conducted a protest by shouting out and interrupting his speech. In response, Lloyd George said: "I see some bats have got into the roof - Well, let them squeal; it doesn't matter. They are counting very little in this election. I have sympathy with their cause, but nothing makes me more despair of their success than their persistence with silly tactics." As the meeting continued the two women pushed a flag through the aperture in the ceiling which dropped to the platform. Lloyd George responded: "I am afraid we shall have to let a cat loose in there!" Both women were arrested and received a police caution.

== Hunger strike ==
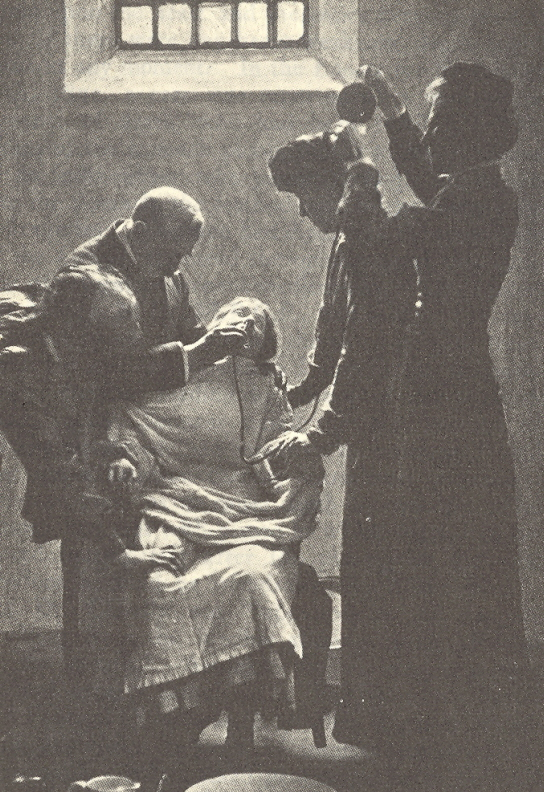
A suffragette is force-fed in HM Prison Holloway in the UK during hunger strikes for women's suffrage, approximately 1911.

Shortly after she was arrested and returned to Liverpool regarding the damage she had caused at Walton Gaol. On 21 January 1910 she was sentenced to six weeks imprisonment with hard labour. Before beginning her sentence she paid 5 shillings. While serving her sentence the WSPU held a protest meeting outside the prison, while in London Emmeline Pethick-Lawrence, the Treasurer of the WSPU, complained of the injustice of Brewster's sentence, comparing it unfavourably to a 5 shilling fine recently given to a man who had attacked a woman holding a baby, knocking both to the ground. Brewster immediately went on hunger strike, at the same time launching an appeal against her sentence. She was released from prison on bail on 30 January 1910 after having gone on hunger strike for six days and been force-fed twice, for which she was awarded the Hunger Strike Medal by the WSPU.

== Black Friday ==
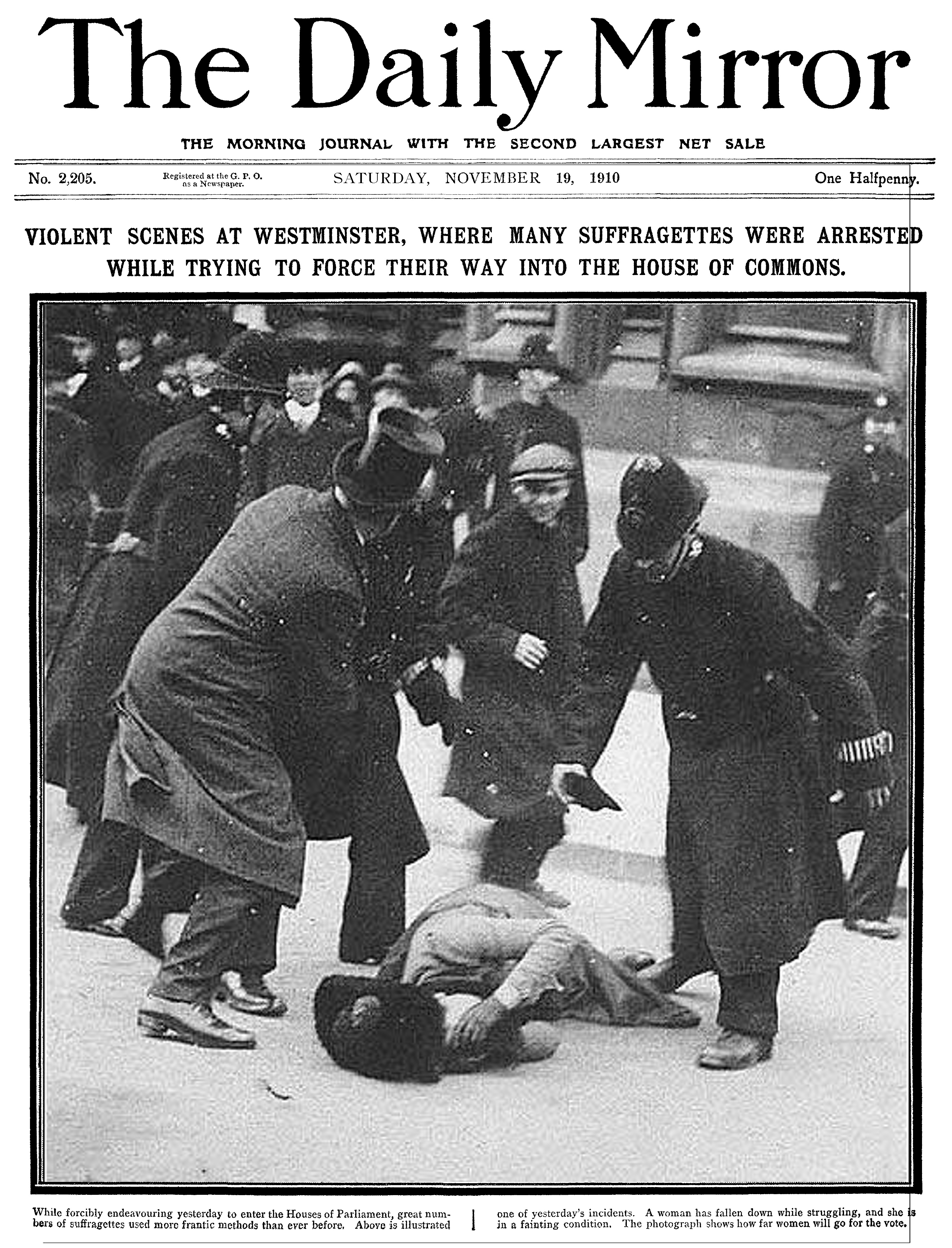
The front page of The Daily Mirror, 19 November 1910, showing a suffragette on the ground during Black Friday

Brewster was again arrested on 18 November 1910 when she and over 300 other women were involved in Black Friday when they marched to the Houses of Parliament as part of their campaign to secure voting rights for women. The day earned its name from the violence meted out to protesters, some of it sexual, by the Metropolitan Police and male bystanders. Brewster was again arrested in November 1911 for smashing two windows at the National Liberal Club valued at 20 shillings. She was fined £5 or sentenced to 21 days in prison, but it is not known which option she chose as the record does not survive. She was arrested again a few weeks later for smashing windows at Rayleigh Post Office for which she was fined £5 or one month imprisonment. However, the fine was paid by a woman in the court. Like many other suffragettes, she refused to submit her details for the 1911 Census.

On 4 June 1912 she wrote from 14 Clifford's Inn to a Mr Taylor to say that she would like to see copies of the letters Taylor had written to George Lansbury and Reginald McKenna, the Home Secretary. She added that the Society was deeply grateful to all men who, like Mark Wilks, the husband of suffragette Elizabeth Wilks, gave active support to the cause of women's suffrage. She added that she was glad to hear the Mrs Taylor had not suffered permanently from her imprisonment and hunger strike.

Her letter to the Editor of The Daily Telegraph of 26 February 1913 read:

Everyone seems to agree upon the necessity of putting a stop to Suffragist outrages, but no-one seems certain how to do so. There are two, only two ways in which this can be done. Both will be effectual.
1. Kill every woman in the United Kingdom.
2. Give women the vote.
Yours truly
Bertha Brewster

== Later years ==
In February 1914 the United Suffragists was founded from members of the National Union of Women's Suffrage Societies and the Women's Social and Political Union (WSPU). In contrast to the WSPU, it admitted men, and it also admitted non-militant suffragists. During World War I the WSPU ceased its campaign. However, the United Suffragists did not, and assumed publication of Votes for Women as its mouthpiece. Brewster was actively involved, becoming a member of the governing committee as Secretary and also helped to found a branch of the United Suffragists in Birmingham. Also in 1914 her younger brother, Philip Brewster, later to be imprisoned as a conscientious objector, married suffragette Clara Giveen. With the introduction of women's suffrage in 1918, the group dissolved itself, after holding a victory celebration, and also participating in the NUWSS celebrations, and discontinued its newspaper.

After the war Brewster became a fundraiser for the Save the Children Fund, which was founded in London in April 1919 as an effort to alleviate starvation of children in Germany and Austria-Hungary during the Allied blockade of Germany of World War I which continued after the Armistice. She also became a supporter of the Labour Party as a fundraiser to fight election campaigns.

Brewster latterly lived on "private means" in Weobley, a village in Herefordshire and died at Sallanches Hospital at Haute-Savoie in France in 1959. She left her estate valued at £3495 12s. 6d. to her brother Philip Brewster. a retired consulting engineer. She never married.
