= Morebattle Hurdle =

Hurdle horse race in Scotland

Morebattle Hurdle
2026
Captain Hugo	Serious Challenge	Wise Eagle

Previous years
2025
Cracking Rhapsody	Alnilam	Old Gregorian
2024
Cracking Rhapsody	Ginger Mail	Skycutter
2023
Benson	Colonel Mustard	L'eau Du Sud
2022
Cormier	Saint D'Oroux	Faivoir
2021
The Shunter	Night Edition	Faivoir

2020-2011
2019
We Have A Dream	Get Out The Gate	Cornerstone Lad
2018
Cyrus Darius	Better Getalong	Chti Balko
2017
Cyrus Darius	One For Harry	Knockara Beau
2016
Top Notch	One For Harry	Chic Name
2015
Glingerburn	Hawk High	Meadowcroft Boy
2014
Runswick Royal	Upsilon Bleu	Special Catch
2013
Duke of Navan	Any Given Day	Morning Royalty
2012
Simonsig	Knockara Beau	Local Hero
2011
Peddlers Cross	Bygones of Brid	Hollins

2010-2001
2010
Quwetwo	Zaynar	Kempski
2008
Bywell Beau	First Look	Mohayer
2007
Brave Vision	Endless Power	Hush Tiger
2006
Culcabock	Crazy Horse	Nerone
2005
Kimbambo	Oracle des Mottes	Brave Vision
2004
Chivalry	Radar	Colorado Falls

2000-1991
2000
Kathryn's Pet	Crazy Horse	Spartan Royale
1999
Caulker	Robbo	Justin Mac
1998
Marello	Political Tower	Common Sound
1997
Direct Route	Uncle Doug	Thornton Gate
1995
Large Action	Surrey Dancer	Batabanoo
1994
Grey Power	Dizzy	Jinxy Jack
1993
Jinxy Jack	Dizzy	Seon
1992
Jinxy Jack	Precious Boy	Mr Woodcock
1991
Jinxy Jack	Past Glories	Kharif

1990-1988
1990
Jinxy Jack	Past Glories	Casual Pass
1989
Blazing Walker	Pat's Jester	Merry Junior
1988
Nohalmdun	Pat's Jester	Comanchero

The Morebattle Hurdle is a Class 2 National Hunt handicap hurdle race open to horses aged four years or older. It is run in early March at Kelso Racecourse in the Scottish Borders over a distance of 2 miles and 51 yards; there are eight hurdles to be jumped.

Previously a handicap race, it was first run as a conditions contest in 1984. Jinxy Jack won four consecutive runnings of the race from 1990 to 1993 and went on to finish third in the 1994 renewal named in his honour. The 2010 running saw pre-race Champion Hurdle favourite Zaynar, trained by Nicky Henderson, beaten at starting odds of fourteen-to-one on in one of the shortest-price upsets ever in British horse racing. The race reverted to handicap status in 2021.

== Winners ==
Year	Winner	Age	Jockey	Trainer
1984	Hill's Guard	5	Andrew Stringer	A Scott
1985	Browne's Gazette	7	Dermot Browne	Monica Dickinson
1986	Abandoned due to snow
1987	Ballydurrow	10	Micky Hammond	Roger Fisher
1988	Nohalmdun	7	Lorcan Wyer	Peter Easterby
1989	Blazing Walker	5	Alan Merrigan	Arthur Stephenson
1990	Jinxy Jack	6	Neale Doughty	Gordon W. Richards
1991	Jinxy Jack	7	Neale Doughty	Gordon W. Richards
1992	Jinxy Jack	8	Neale Doughty	Gordon W. Richards
1993	Jinxy Jack	9	Neale Doughty	Gordon W. Richards
1994	Grey Power	7	Peter Niven	Mary Reveley
1995	Large Action	7	Jamie Osborne	Oliver Sherwood
1996	Abandoned due to frost and snow
1997	Direct Route	6	Paul Carberry	J Howard Johnson
1998	Marello	7	Peter Niven	Mary Reveley
1999	Caulker	6	Scott Taylor	Maurice Barnes
2000	Kathryn's Pet	7	Alan Dempsey	Mary Reveley
2001	Abandoned due to frost
2002	Abandoned due to frost
2003	Abandoned due to snow
2004	Chivalry	5	Graham Lee	J Howard Johnson
2005	Kimbambo	7	G Berridge	J P L Ewart
2006	Culcabock	6	Dougie Costello	Lucinda Russell
2007	Brave Vision	11	E Whillans	A C Whillans
2008	Bywell Beau	9	Jan Faltejsek	G A Charlton
2009	Abandoned due to frost
2010	Quwetwo	7	Wilson Renwick	J Howard Johnson
2011	Peddlers Cross	6	Jason Maguire	Donald McCain
2012	Simonsig	6	Barry Geraghty	Nicky Henderson
2013	Duke of Navan	5	Brian Harding	Nicky Richards
2014	Runswick Royal	5	Brian Hughes	Ann Hamilton
2015	Glingerburn	7	Brian Harding	Nicky Richards
2016	Top Notch	5	Daryl Jacob	Nicky Henderson
2017	Cyrus Darius	8	Brian Hughes	Malcolm Jefferson
2018	Cyrus Darius	9	Brian Hughes	Ruth Jefferson
2019	We Have A Dream	5	Daryl Jacob	Nicky Henderson
2020	Abandoned due to waterlogging
2021	The Shunter	8	Alain Cawley	Emmet Mullins
2022	Cormier	6	Sean Quinlan	Brian Ellison
2023	Benson	8	Ryan Mania	Sandy Thomson
2024	Cracking Rhapsody	5	Craig Nicol	Ewan Williams
2025	Cracking Rhapsody	6	Craig Nicol	Ewan Williams
2026	Captain Hugo	6	Sean Houlihan	Philip Hobbs & Johnson White

== See also ==
- Horse racing in Great Britain
- List of British National Hunt races
