= Premier Novices' Hurdle =

Hurdle horse race in Britain

Premier Kelso Hurdle
2026
Montemares	Kosac D'oudairies	West Hill Verde

Previous years
2025
Jet To Vegas	Chart Topper	Castle Carrock
2024
Personal Ambition	Jango Baie	Cannock Park
2023
Nemean Lion	Colonel Harry	Snake Roll
2022
Nells Son	North Lodge	Bold Endeavour
2021
My Drogo	Do Your Job	Castle Rushen

2020-2011
2020
Clondaw Caitlin	Elf De Re	Cheddleton
2019
Rouge Vif	Windsor Avenue	Elvis Mail
2017
Mount Mews	Chalonnial	Only two finished
2016
Le Prezien	The Dutchman	Meet The Legend
2015
Glingerburn	Bristol De Mai	Intense Tango
2014
Clever Cookie	Fergall	Hit The Top
2013
Mwaleshi	Eduard	Brick Red
2012
Tap Night	Captain Conan	Bury Parade
2011
Bold Sir Brian	Desert Cry	Wyse Hill Teabags

2010-2001
2010
Bygones of Brid	Soft Spoken Guy	Predictive
2009
Knockara Beau	Wendel	Alfie Flits
2008
Ignotus	Pagan Starprincess	Scriptwriter
2007
Bywell Beau	Mohayer	Open de L'Isle
2005
Mephisto	Faasel	Habitual Dancer
2004
Paddy The Piper	Steppes of Gold	Patriarch Express
2003
Covent Garden	Talarive	No Collusion

2000-1990
2000
Master Tern	Mixsterthetrixster	Lord of the Sky
1999
Crazy Horse	Tessajoe	Major Sponsor
1998
Leviticus	Deep Water	Ledgendry Line
1997
Marello	Star Selection	Dana Point
1996
Penny A Day	Direct Route	Santa Concerto
1995
Wills Telmar	Noyan	Ingletonian
1994
Morceli	Five To Seven	Marchwood
1993
Majed	Bellton	Golden Isle
1992
Preoblakensky	Kirkton Grey	Benghazi
1991
Abbot Of Furness	Vestal Hills	All Welcome
1990
Ambuscade	Sagaman	Power Boat

The Premier Novices' Hurdle (renamed in 2020 from the Premier Kelso Hurdle) is a Grade 2 National Hunt hurdle race in Britain which is open to horses aged four years or older. It is run at Kelso over a distance of about 2 miles and 2 furlongs (2 miles, 2 furlongs and 25 yards or 3,644 metres), and there are ten hurdles to be jumped. As of 2024, it is the only Graded race in the British Jump Pattern programme to be run over this distance. The race is for novice hurdlers, and it is scheduled to take place each year in late February or early March.

The race was first run in 1990 and was awarded Grade 2 status (previously Class B) in 2003.

== Winners ==
Year	Winner	Age	Jockey	Trainer
1990	Ambuscade	4	Mark Dwyer	George Moore
1991	Abbot of Furness	7	Neale Doughty	Gordon W. Richards
1992	Preoblakensky	5	Neale Doughty	Gordon W. Richards
1993	Majed	5	Peter Niven	Mary Reveley
1994	Morceli	6	James Moffatt	Howard Johnson
1995	Wills Telmar	7	Neale Doughty	Howard Johnson
1996	Penny a Day	6	Peter Niven	Mary Reveley
1997	Marello	6	Peter Niven	Mary Reveley
1998	Leviticus	4	Jason Callaghan	Tom Tate
1999	Crazy Horse	6	Robbie Supple	Len Lungo
2000	Master Tern	5	Tony Dobbin	Jonjo O'Neill
2001	Abandoned due to foot and mouth outbreak
2002	Abandoned due to waterlogging
2003	Covent Garden	5	Graham Lee	Howard Johnson
2004	Paddy the Piper	7	Tony Dobbin	Len Lungo
2005	Mephisto	6	Warren Marston	Howard Johnson
2006	Abandoned due to frost
2007	Bywell Beau	8	Jan Faltejsek	George Charlton
2008	Ignotus	6	Tom Greenall (Note: amateur jockey)	Alan Swinbank
2009	Knockara Beau	6	Jan Faltejsek	George Charlton
2010	Bygones of Brid	7	Graham Lee	Karen McLintock
2011	Bold Sir Brian	5	Peter Buchanan	Lucinda Russell
2012	Tap Night	5	Peter Buchanan	Lucinda Russell
2013	Mwaleshi	8	Jonathan England	Sue Smith
2014	Clever Cookie	6	Wilson Renwick	Peter Niven
2015	Glingerburn	7	Brian Harding	Nicky Richards
2016	Le Prezien	5	Sam Twiston-Davies	Paul Nicholls
2017	Mount Mews	6	Brian Hughes	Malcolm Jefferson
2018	Abandoned due to snow
2019	Rouge Vif	5	Gavin Sheehan	Harry Whittington
2020	Clondaw Caitlin	5	Brian Hughes	Ruth Jefferson
2021	My Drogo	6	Harry Skelton	Dan Skelton
2022	Nells Son	7	Sean O'Keeffe	Nicky Richards
2023	Nemean Lion	6	Richard Patrick	Kerry Lee
2024	Personal Ambition	5	Kielan Woods	Ben Pauling
2025	Jet To Vegas	6	Derek Fox	Lucinda Russell
2026	Montemares	5	Stan Sheppard	Tom Lacey

== See also ==
- Horse racing in Great Britain
- List of British National Hunt races
