= Loch of Mey =

Lake in Caithness, Scotland

Coordinates: 58°38′40″N 03°15′26″W

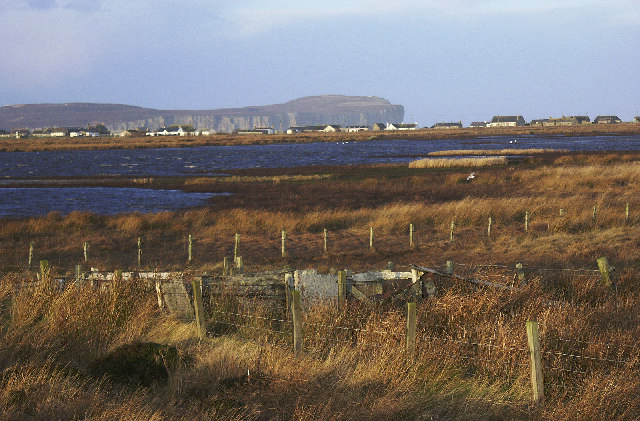
Loch of Mey

Loch of Mey is a loch near the north coast of Caithness, Scotland, and one of the most northern water features of mainland Britain. It lies just to the south of Skarfskerry, and southwest of Harrow. Described as a "shallow ephemeral loch fringed by fen", due to its importance in facilitating wintering populations of whooper swan and greylag goose from Greenland and Iceland, it has formed part of the Caithness Lochs Ramsar Site since February 1998. Ornithologists of the Scottish Ornithologists Club have established a footpath and memorial hide dedicated to James MacIntyre, which was renovated in August 2005. The Burn of Horsegrow flows into the loch on its southeastern side. Loch of Mey is a Site of Special Scientific Interest (SSSI).
