= Steep Marsh =

Village in Hampshire, England

Coordinates: 51.030356°N 0.938392°W

- Location within Hampshire
- OS grid reference: SU7454226202
- District: East Hampshire
- Shire county: Hampshire
- Region: South East
- Country: England
- Sovereign state: United Kingdom
- Post town: PETERSFIELD
- Postcode district: GU32 2
- Dialling code: 01730
- Police: Hampshire and Isle of Wight
- Fire: Hampshire and Isle of Wight
- Ambulance: South Central

Steep Marsh is a small village in the civil parish of Steep situated in the South Downs Area of Outstanding Natural Beauty in the East Hampshire district of Hampshire, England. Its nearest town is Petersfield, which lies approximately 2 miles (3 km)) south from the village.
