= Jessie C. Methven =

Scottish campaigner for women's suffrage

- Born: 1854
- Died: 15 February 1917 (aged 62–63)
- Occupation: Honorary Secretary
- Years active: 1895-1913
- Political party: Independent Labour Party
- Movement: National Society for Women's Suffrage, Women's Social and Political Union

Jessie Cunningham Methven (1854 – 15 February 1917) was a Scottish campaigner for women's suffrage. She was honorary secretary of the Edinburgh National Society for Women's Suffrage from the mid 1890s until 1906. In that role, She corresponded regularly with national and local newspapers across Scotland on the subject of women's suffrage. She subsequently joined the more militant Women's Social and Political Union and described herself as an "independent socialist". Methven took part in suffragette protests and was arrested for breaking windows in London in 1911. She wrote an article for The Suffragette newspaper, the weekly newspaper of the WSPU, entitled Women's Suffrage in the Past, A Record of Betrayal which reflected on the history of the women's suffrage movement in Britain.

== Early life ==
Jessie Cunningham Methven was born in Edinburgh in 1854 to Janet Allan and Thomas Methven. She resided at 25 Great King Street, Edinburgh throughout her life with her sisters Helen and Minnie and brother Henry, a seed merchant. The 1901 census records her as "living on own means". In 1885 her mother hosted a "drawing room meeting" of the Edinburgh National Society for Women's Suffrage, which Methven later went on to become secretary of.

== Campaign for women's suffrage ==
Methven campaigned for women's suffrage for many years and has been described as "a very active worker for the cause". As honorary secretary of the Edinburgh National Society for Women's Suffrage, she was a prolific writer to newspapers and local authorities to raise awareness and support for women's suffrage. She raised funds, organised petitions and took part in peaceful demonstrations as a suffragist. She latterly became disillusioned with this approach, and joined the more militant Women's Social and Political Union (WSPU) in 1906. She participated in suffragette protests and was arrested in London in 1911.

=== Edinburgh National Society for Women's Suffrage ===
Methven was elected to the executive committee of the Edinburgh National Society for Women's Suffrage in December 1895 and subsequently became its honorary secretary. She worked closely with its founder and president Priscilla Bright McLaren until McLaren's death in 1906. In 1897, the Society affiliated to the new National Union of Women's Suffrage Societies and Methven was one of the Society's two representatives on the NUWSS Parliamentary Committee.

Methven was a member of the Society's Special Appeals Committee, which was involved in producing a national petition for women's suffrage to be presented as part of the Parliamentary Franchise (Extension to Women) Bill in May 1896. There were 257,796 signatures on the petition by the time it was submitted, including more than 50,000 signatories from Scotland. Despite this, the bill was not discussed in the House of Commons. In April 1896, Methven had written to Brechin Town Council asking them to petition Parliament in favour of the Bill. One councillor, a Mr Laing, proposed a vote but no seconder could be found.

According to Pedersen (2017), "campaigners such as Jessie Methven were clearly aware of the importance of [press] coverage in educating the wider populace". Methven corresponded regularly with local and national newspapers, often writing to thank editors for raising the profile of women's suffrage through their coverage of meetings. As secretary of the Society, her name was attached to reports, articles and letters to the newspapers and she had a relatively high profile in the Scottish press.

Methven was named as a "memorialist" of an article on "assaults upon a wife", drafted by the committee of the Edinburgh National Society for Women's Suffrage and published in The Women's Signal, a "weekly record and review for ladies", on 16 February 1899. It noted that "these names are all honoured ones in Edinburgh, and indeed some of them throughout the kingdom."

In 1901, a circular letter signed by Methven and Mrs McClaren was reported on in a number of Scottish newspapers, expressing disappointment at the indifference shown by political associations to the question of women's suffrage. It suggested that the recent failure of the Scottish Liberal Association to include women in their resolution in favour of 'manhood suffrage' was a result of their fear that "all women will vote Tory".

Methven raised a resolution at the Society's 1904 annual meeting, "that women should refuse to work for any parliamentary candidate unless he publicly pledges himself to vote for the extension of the franchise to women". The resolution was not passed but the committee agreed to "urge" its members not to support candidates who did not support women's suffrage.

=== Militancy and the WSPU ===
After years as a committed "constitutional suffragist", Methven became increasingly disillusioned by the lack of progress. In January 1906, she signed the Joint Women's Social and Political Union and Independent Labour Party manifesto as an "independent socialist". After a WSPU demonstration in the House of Commons in April 1906 which prompted outrage in the press, Methven wrote to the Glasgow Herald as an individual rather than as secretary of the Society, to express sympathy for the protestors' loss of patience in more peaceful approaches. She cautioned that "care must be taken that the incident is not allowed to be used as an excuse for further inaction" on women's suffrage.

After Priscilla Bright McLaren's death in November 1906, many of the Society's members flocked to the recently formed Edinburgh branch of the WSPU, "even Jessie Methven, the society's long-standing secretary, joined the militants". In 1907, she wrote to the Women's Franchise periodical on behalf of the Society's executive committee, announcing that they were to unite with the Edinburgh branch of the WSPU on a demonstration to be held in Edinburgh on 5 October.

On 21 November 1911 Methven was one of 223 protesters arrested at a WSPU demonstration at the House of Commons, to which she had travelled with five other women from Edinburgh (Elizabeth and Agnes Thomson, Edith Hudson, Alice Shipley and Mrs N Grieve. The demonstrations followed the "torpedoing" of the Conciliation Bill, proposed legislation which would have extended the franchise to women with property. She was charged with breaking windows in the Foreign Office and was sentenced to 10 days and a 10/- fine. The Scotsman recorded that she had been "for many years hon. secretary of the older Suffrage Society, and worked under Mrs Priscilla Bright McLaren". Reports of her arrest in the Scottish press contained variant spellings of her surname, including Methuen (The Scotsman) and Mothuel (Dundee Courier). She is listed on the Roll of Honour of Suffragette Prisoners 1905-1914 as JC Methuen.

Methven was an active member of the WSPU, continuing to write to newspapers, selling copies of The Suffragette newspaper, and contributing regularly to its £250,000 fund. In 1911, she donated a hand printing press to the Edinburgh branch.

In January 1913, Methven wrote an article for The Suffragette, the weekly newspaper of the WSPU, entitled Women's Suffrage in the Past, A Record of Betrayal. It covers the history of the women's suffrage movement, her loss of faith in suffragism and her conclusion that "militancy will bring victory". The newspaper's introduction suggests that she was well known and regarded within the suffragette movement: "The following article will be of special interest to our readers at this time, written as it is by one who can claim an intimate knowledge of the old and new movements for Woman Suffrage. Miss Methven was a personal friend of the pioneers of the Women's Suffrage movement in the country and shared with them the high hopes, the disappointments and the subsequent disillusionment which attended the fate of the many Woman Suffrage measures which have been brought forward in the House of Commons. Miss Methven was the first of the pioneer suffragists to understand the value of the new militant movement and to declare her faith in it. She has been for some years a prominent member of the Edinburgh WSPU."

== Death ==
Methven died at home at 25 Great King Street on 15 February 1917. The following year, the Representation of the People Act 1918 was passed in parliament, granting the vote to women with property over the age of 30.
