= Steep, Hampshire =

Village and parish in Hampshire, England

Coordinates: 51.023°N 0.945°W

Steep
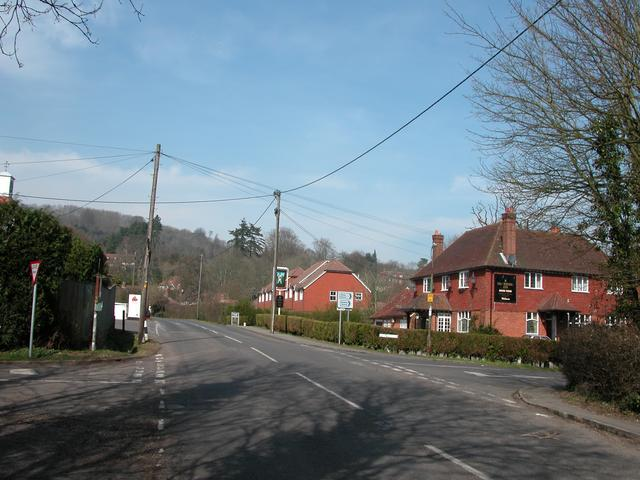
- Steep village centre during winter

- Location within Hampshire
- Population: 1,391 (2011 census)
- OS grid reference: SU746253
- Civil parish: Steep
- District: East Hampshire
- Shire county: Hampshire
- Region: South East
- Country: England
- Sovereign state: United Kingdom
- Post town: Petersfield
- Postcode district: GU32
- Police: Hampshire and Isle of Wight
- Fire: Hampshire and Isle of Wight
- Ambulance: South Central
- UK Parliament: East Hampshire

Steep is a village and civil parish in the East Hampshire district of Hampshire, England. Its nearest town is Petersfield, which lies 1.4 miles (2.3 km) south of the village, just off the A3 road. The nearest railway station is Petersfield, at 1.6 miles (2.6 km) south of the village. It has two public houses, The Harrow and the Cricketers Inn, with the former being an 18th-century Grade II listed building. According to the 2011 census, it had a population of 1,391.

Iron Age and Roman remains have been found in the area. Steep formerly included two detached exclaves, the larger called Ambersham, which lay deep inside Sussex. These were two of the three detached portions of Hampshire in Sussex, and were annexed to that county when a new law came into effect in 1844. The church of All Saints was built around 1125. From medieval times, Steep was included in the parish of East Meon until it became an independent parish in 1867. Since 1899 the village has been the location of Bedales, a progressive public school.

== History ==
=== Prehistory to Roman ===
The village name has been spelled in various ways, including La Stuppe, La Stiepe, and Stupe (14th century) and Steepe (17th century). There is evidence of Roman occupation in the village, with pottery, coins, baths and a Roman villa being discovered on Bell Hill, directly opposite the village centre. A Roman earthworks ridge was also found on Stoner Hill, which suggests evidence of Roman roads passing through the causeway. Iron Age remains found in the area include pottery, boilers, and a site of a "sub-rectangular enclosure" found in Steep village centre. A Bronze Age barrow house was also excavated in the parish.

=== Medieval to Tudor ===
The village was not mentioned in the Domesday Survey of 1086, however it was likely included under the entry of 'Menes'. (Meon)

Beginning at an unknown point in the medieval period, the territory of the village of Steep formerly included two detached parish exclaves the larger of which was called Ambersham. This was a narrow strip of land situated 10.3 miles (16.6 km) east in the county of West Sussex, situated between Midhurst and Petworth and running south from the Surrey border near Haslemere to near Graffham. Under the Counties (Detached Parts) Act 1844, Ambersham was detached from Steep and made part of Sussex. For ecclesiastical reasons it had been split into two tithings or parish sub-divisions, North Ambersham and South Ambersham, and these became civil parishes. Ecclesiastically the former was annexed to Fernhurst, and the latter to Easebourne. The smaller of the two exclaves was a three-acre portion of Borden Wood in the Sussex parish of Chithurst, which was only united with the latter parish in 1883 because it had no inhabitants. Both of these detached portions were also exclaves of Hampshire.

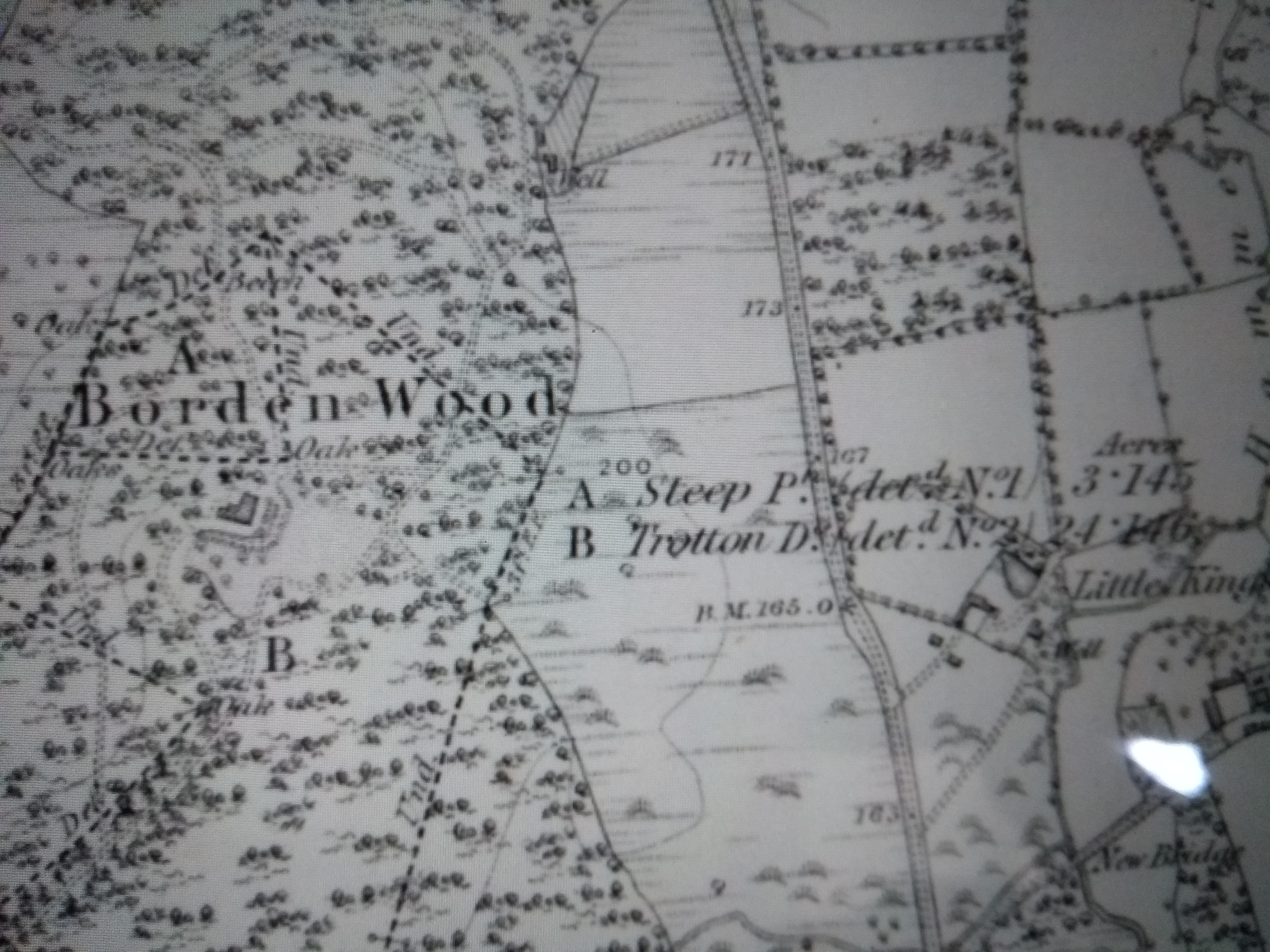
Steep's tiny exclave in a Sussex wood

There is no written evidence that Steep was settled until late in the Anglo-Saxon period, however in the early Anglo Saxon period the Meon Valley formed the Jutish Kingdom of Meonwara. In the medieval period Steep was a sub-parish of East Meon. so it too was probably a settlement of the Jutes and the Ambershams may well have been too.

Steep was first documented under the name of 'Stepe Place' in the 12th century. The church of All Saints was built around 1125. The oldest surviving dwelling in the village is the house known as "Restalls" which is on the eastern side of the church. It dates from the late 15th century, and was remodelled in 1600 (and in 1905 by the Arts and Crafts architect William Frederick Unsworth who lived here).

By 1600, Steep had a prospering local cloth-making industry and two fulling mills in operation, which were driven by the nearby Ashford Stream. The early 17th century was also described by historian William Page as a "great rebuilding" of the village, in which redevelopment of many wooden buildings were replaced by stone structures. However, a decline in the cloth-making industry caused a depression in the latter half of the 17th century, which resulted in the closure of both mills.

=== 19th century to Second World War ===
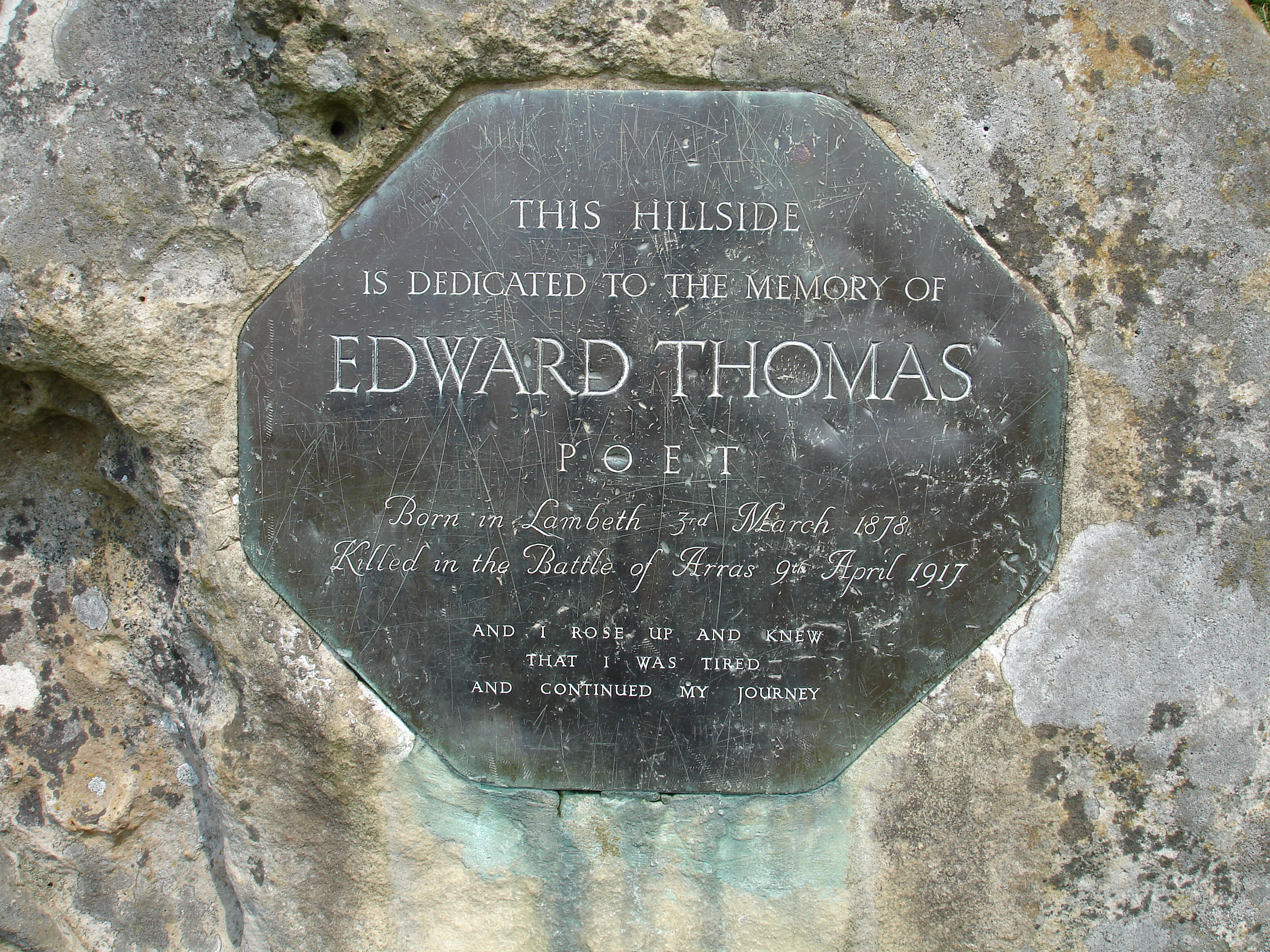
Edward Thomas' memorial stone on a hillside near Steep

By the 1830s the British Agricultural Revolution had disturbed traditional society and created a class of labourers who struggled to support their families in rural areas. This led to an unrest known as the Swing Riots which swept across southern England, consequently reaching Selborne and Liphook in September 1830. The parliamentary inclosure acts of 1856 established a new land pattern for nearby Steep Marsh and Stroud, which still exists today. There was also extensive land drainage between 1860 and 1880; conduits and sluices were constructed to take water from Ashford Stream for the artificial flooding of hay meadows. In Steep, hops were grown for use in local breweries, watercress produced for commercial use, and a condensed milk factory was in operation in Steep Marsh.

Voluntary schools were built in Steep in 1875, and the first almshouses were constructed by William Eames in 1882. The first coeducational boarding school in England, Bedales School was constructed in 1899 at a cost of approximately £60,000, which at the time of 1912, had an enrolment of 160 children. However, another source described the school as being constructed in 1900, and was formerly located in Lindfield, West Sussex.

The First World War poet Edward Thomas lived in the village; his children attended Bedales and his wife also taught there.

The prominent English poet, author and artist Thomas Sturge Moore lived at "Hillcroft" in Steep from 1919 to 1927, while his children Daniel and Riette attended Bedales. Sturge Moore took an active interest in Bedales, giving readings, speaking at Sunday assemblies, and teaching a class in aesthetics in 1924–1925.

== Geography and demographics ==
Steep is located in the eastern part of southern Hampshire in South East England, 1.4 miles (2.3 km) north of Petersfield, its nearest town. The parish covers an area of 2,658 acres (1,076 ha), of which 1,222 acres (495 ha) are permanent grass, 443.7 acres (179.6 ha) of fertile land and 233 acres (94 ha) of woodland. The village is situated at the foot of the steep forested slopes of Stoner Hill and Wheatham Hill, which both lie on the western edge of the South Downs National Park. The parish has two streams; the first stream rises from Ashford Lodge and flows east to Steep Marsh, whereas a second stream rises at the foot of Wheatham Hill follows the northern boundaries of the parish, joining the first stream close to the village of Sheet. Two main roads run through the parish, from Petersfield to Farnham on the east and the Petersfield and Ropley road on the southwest, the latter winding up the steep slopes of Stoner Hill.

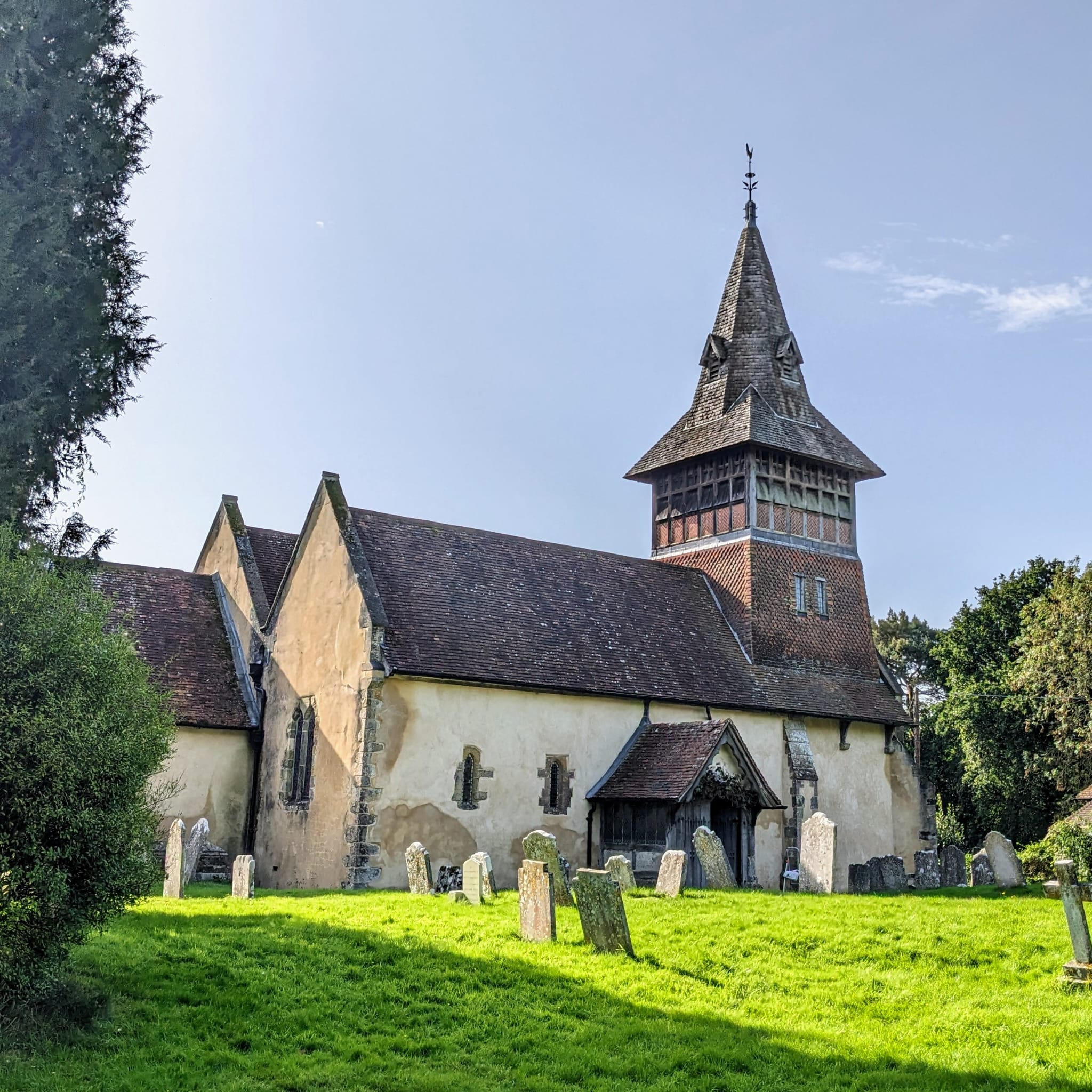
All Saints' Church, Steep, Hants

The soil is of marl, clay, and sandy loam, with the subsoil being gravel and sand. The prominent crops are wheat, barley, and oats, and a smaller number of hops. According to the 2011 census, Steep had a population of 849 people.

== Notable landmarks ==
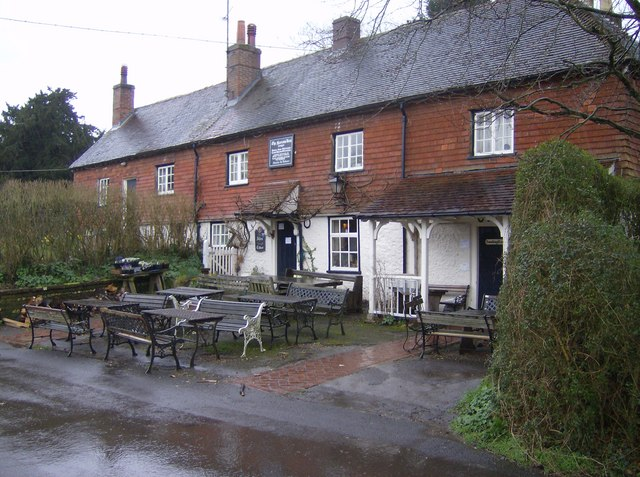
The Harrow

The church of All Saints was first constructed in the 12th century and has some parts which still date to its original design. It has a chancel that measures 16 feet (4.9 m) by 13 feet (4.0 m), a nave which measures 50 feet (15 m) by 16 feet (4.9 m) and north and south aisles which run from 13 feet (4.0 m) to 5 feet (1.5 m) wide, respectively. The eastern bays of the south arcade of the nave date from 1180; however, it seems probable that the oldest masonry on the site belongs to an older church from either Colemore or Ropley. Before the north aisle was constructed, there is evidence to suggest that a wooden north-west tower existed.

In approximately 1200 a north aisle was added, with its width being determined by the projection of the north transept chapel, with the west and east walls taken down at the time. The different thickness of the walls in the present church suggests that the wall for the length of the first three bays of the arcade was taken down and rebuilt in the 13th century. The church underwent a restoration in 1839, with £370 being spent, and in 1875 at a cost of £2,377.

The churchyard contains six Commonwealth war graves from the First World War: two Royal Navy sailors, two Royal Air Force officers, a Royal Engineers officer and a Hampshire Regiment soldier.

The Harrow is a Grade II listed public house which was first built in the 18th century. It is on the Campaign for Real Ale's National Inventory of Historic Pub Interiors.

== Notable residents ==
- Bertha Brewster (1887–1959), suffragette
- Thomas Sturge Moore (1870–1944), poet, author, critic
- Thomas Jeeves Horder, 1st Baron Horder of Ashford (1871–1955), royal physician
- Edward Thomas (1878–1917), Anglo-Welsh poet
