= Lilias Mitchell =

Scottish suffragist

Lilias Tait Mitchell
- Born: 24 March 1884; Leith, Edinburgh, Scotland
- Died: 24 September 1940 (aged 56); Edinburgh, Scotland
- Other names: Lillias Mitchell
- Parent(s): Alexander Mitchell, Annie Mitchell

Lilias Mitchell (1884-1940) was a Scottish suffragette and campaigner for political and social reform.

== Early life ==
Lilias Mitchell was born in Leith, to Annie Mitchell and Alexander Mitchell, a timber merchant.

== Women's suffrage ==
In 1907 or 1908, Mitchell and her mother attended a suffrage meeting at which Emmeline Pankhurst and Emmeline Pethick-Lawrence spoke. Lilias joined the Women's Social and Political Union at that meeting. In 1910, Mitchell was part of a WSPU march to the House of Commons which was broken up by the police. She was arrested, and served a short sentence in Holloway Prison.

By 1912 Mitchell was the WSPU organiser for Aberdeen. In March 1912, she took part in the large-scale WSPU window-smashing campaign in London, and again was arrested and sentenced to four months in Holloway. As was the WSPU policy at the time, she went on hunger strike, and was subsequently forcibly fed by the prison authorities. Back in Aberdeen, she drew attention to the women's suffrage cause with stunts such as painting all the flags on Balmoral golf course in the WSPU purple, white and green colours, and arguing with the Prime Minister, Herbert Asquith, at Dornoch golf course.

Mitchell then became the WSPU organiser for Newcastle and District in September 1912, after the resignation of Laura Ainsworth.

In July 1913 Mitchell was sent to organise in Birmingham. There, in early 1914, she and Mary Richardson used a bomb to blow up a railway station on the outskirts of the city. In May 1914 she was arrested for breach of the peace, and sent to Winson Green Prison. She again went on hunger-strike. Under the government's 'Cat and Mouse Act' she was released to regain her health, then re-arrested in June 1914.

== Later work ==
After the World War I, Mitchell continued her political and social reform activities. She was a member of Edinburgh Women Citizens Association and wrote for The Scotsman. In addition, she was Honorary Secretary of the Child Assault Protest Committee, East of Scotland secretary for the League of Nations Union and secretary of the Scottish Division of the Young Women's Christian Association.

== Death ==
Mitchell died in 1940 from a heart condition.
