= The Harrow, Steep =

Listed pub in Hampshire, England

The Harrow
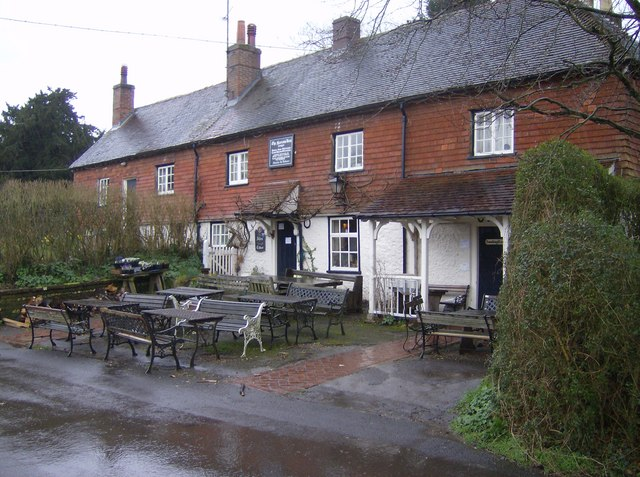
- The pub in 2007

- Location within Hampshire
- Alternative names: The Harrow Inn

General information
- Type: Public house
- Location: Harrow Lane, Steep, Hampshire, England
- Coordinates: 51.021501°N 0.927483°W
- Year built: 18th century
- Renovated: 19th and 20th century (enlarged)
- Owner: Independent

Design and construction
- Designations

Listed Building – Grade II
- Official name: The Harrow Inn
- Designated: 14 July 1977
- Reference no.: 1253271

Website
- theharrowinnsteep.co.uk

The Harrow is a Grade II listed public house on Harrow Lane in Steep, Hampshire, England. Originating as a roadside inn in the 18th century, possibly incorporating parts of an earlier 17th-century building, it was enlarged during the 19th and 20th centuries. Its interior is included in the Campaign for Real Ale (CAMRA)'s National Inventory of Historic Pub Interiors, where it holds a three-star rating denoting "outstanding national historic importance".

== History ==
The building originated as a roadside inn in the 18th century, possibly incorporating fabric from an earlier 17th-century structure, and was enlarged during the 19th and 20th centuries.

The pub has been associated with the Dodd and McCutcheon families since 1932. In 1991, the family purchased the property from Whitbread. It later came under the ownership of sisters Claire and Nisa McCutcheon, granddaughters of Arthur and Annie May Dodd.

On 15 July 1977, the Harrow Inn was designated a Grade II listed building. It was included on the Campaign for Real Ale (CAMRA)'s National Inventory of Historic Pub Interiors before the inventory's grading system was revised. Under the revised scheme, it is rated three stars and its interior is regarded as being "of outstanding national historic importance".

The Guardian calls the Harrow Inn "one of Britain's timeless, rural watering holes", on a quiet country lane that becomes a footpath as it reaches a small stream by the pub. It received The Good Pub Guide's 'Most Unspoilt Pub of the Year' award on four occasions between 1996 and 2018.

== Architecture ==
=== Exterior ===
The building developed in several phases. The earliest section includes timber-framed construction with brick infill, while later additions were built in brick and stone. The roof is covered with clay tiles.

The inn stands on sloping ground that rises from east to west and is arranged along a single range facing south. The 18th-century section occupies the western end, with later additions extending to the east. The ground floor contains the public rooms and service areas, with accommodation on the upper floor.

The principal frontage combines several phases of construction. At the western end is an 18th-century single-storey section above a cellar, finished with tile hanging and entered by a raised doorway reached by steps. It is flanked by multi-pane windows, with a smaller window lighting the cellar below. Adjoining this is a two-storey extension with a stone ground floor and tile-hung upper storey, centred on an entrance beneath a small hooded canopy. Further east, later additions continue in a similar style and materials, including another entrance sheltered by a timber veranda beneath a lean-to tiled roof. The roofline is gabled at the west end and hipped at the east, and is punctuated by four unevenly spaced chimney stacks, several of which appear to date from 19th-century alterations.

The west elevation is simple in character, with a single doorway and tile-hung walls. At the rear, part of the timber frame remains visible above a lower wall of stone and brick. Twentieth-century brick additions project from the rear and contain further windows and service entrances. At the eastern end, the upper storey is clad with hanging tiles above a brick ground floor that incorporates a canted bay window.

=== Interior ===
The interior in 2019

Internally, the ground floor is arranged as a series of connected rooms, with separate entrances from the south into both bar areas. The upper floor is reached by a staircase rising from the kitchen in the 18th-century part of the building.

The cellar beneath the earliest section retains substantial timber beams and features a former fireplace beneath a plastered hood. The floor is laid with quarry tiles, incorporating a band of grey brick paving. Above, the kitchen contains exposed timber beams, while a simple straight staircase leads to the first floor.

The 18th-century bar preserves a number of historic fittings and finishes. Its walls are lined with boarding and a dado rail, and it contains an early 20th-century serving hatch with associated counters and shutters. A large fireplace with a timber lintel forms the focal point of the room and includes a cast-iron grate and bread oven. The floor is laid with alternating black and terracotta quarry tiles.

Behind the bars is a 20-century bar back and stillage. At the eastern end, a small lobby links to both the exterior and adjoining rooms. The later 19th-century bar is reached by a short flight of steps and is finished with timber panelling to dado height. It retains exposed ceiling beams and a fireplace with a cast-iron insert set within a timber surround and decorative yellow-tiled detailing. The former Smoking Room also survives, retaining its historic nameplate.
