= Harrow, Caithness =

Coordinates: 58.650313°N 3.23928°W

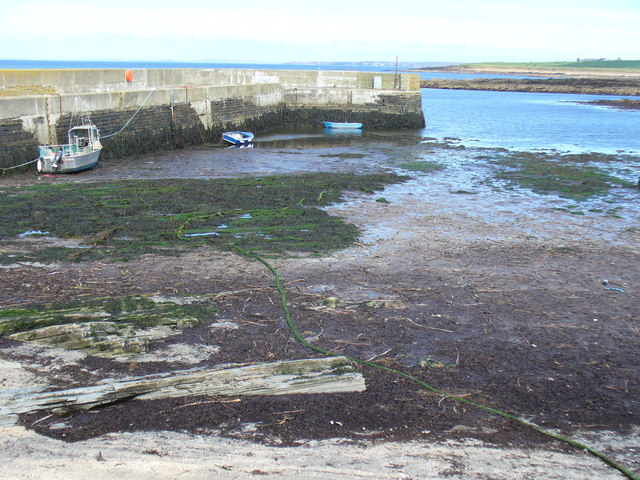

- Location within the Caithness area
- OS grid reference: NC985647
- Council area: Highland
- Country: Scotland
- Sovereign state: United Kingdom
- Police: Scotland
- Fire: Scottish
- Ambulance: Scottish
- UK Parliament: Caithness, Sutherland and Easter Ross
- Scottish Parliament: Caithness, Sutherland and Ross

Harrow is a hamlet on the north coast of Caithness, Scotland. It lies just to the west of the Castle of Mey and northeast of the Loch of Mey. Harrow Harbour, also called Philips Harbour, was built in the 19th century by the Earl of Caithness for exporting the local flagstone slabs. The harbour was restored in 1978–79 by the Highland Council and is used today by a few crab and lobster fishermen. During the restoration works Alexander (Derry) Ross, who had spent several years at sea and was now working on the project, used his Stanley knife to carve images of fishing vessels in the concrete of the sea wall before it set. Originally brightly coloured these are now faded but are still visible. On completion of the works Jimmy Page carried out the official opening ceremony and a plaque commemorating this is mounted on the harbour wall.
