= Benjamin Harrow =

American biochemist and science writer

- Born: August 25, 1888; London
- Died: December 9, 1970 (aged 82); New York
- Occupations: Biochemist, science writer

Benjamin Harrow (August 25, 1888 – December 9, 1970) was an American biochemist, nutritionist and science writer.

Harrow was born in London. He was educated at Finsbury Technical College from 1904 to 1906 and emigrated to the United States in 1907. He obtained a B.S. (1911), A.M. (1912) and Ph.D. (1913) from Columbia University. Harrow's original name was Benjamin Horowitz. It was changed to Harrow after he completed his doctoral studies at Columbia University in 1913. His doctoral thesis was on the reaction of ammonia with thymol.

Harrow was assistant professor at Fordham University Medical School (1913-1914). He was an associate in physiological chemistry at Columbia's College of Physicians and Surgeons (1914-1928). He was Professor of Chemistry at City College of New York in 1939 and chairman in 1944.

In 1947, Harrow was elected to the Royal Society of Arts. He was a member of the American Chemical Society and the American Association for the Advancement of Science. Harrow authored numerous popular works on the history of chemistry. He co-authored An Introduction to Organic Chemistry which was described in a review as an excellent introduction for chemistry students.

Harrow was Jewish. He married Caroline Solis of Philadelphia in 1917, they had one daughter. He died in New York, age 82.

== Selected publications ==
- A Study of the Action of Ammonia on Thymol (1913)
- Eminent Chemists of Our Time (1920)
- Jews in the Field of Modern Science (1920)
- From Newton to Einstein (1920)
- Contemporary Science (1921)
- Glands: In Health and Disease (1922)
- Vitamines: Essential Food Factors (1922)
- What to Eat in Health and Disease (1923)
- An Introduction to Organic Chemistry (with Alexander Lowy, 1924)
- Textbook of Biochemistry (1938)
- Casimir Funk: Pioneer in Vitamins and Hormones (1955)
