= Handley Page Harrow =

The name Harrow was given to two aircraft manufactured by Handley Page:

- Handley Page H.P.31 Harrow, a two-seat single-engine torpedo-bomber biplane of the 1920s
- Handley Page H.P.54 Harrow, a twin-engine high-wing heavy bomber monoplane of the 1930s
