= Kelso Racecourse =

Horse racing venue in Scottish Borders, Scotland

Coordinates: 55°36′49.01″N 2°25′52.02″W

Kelso
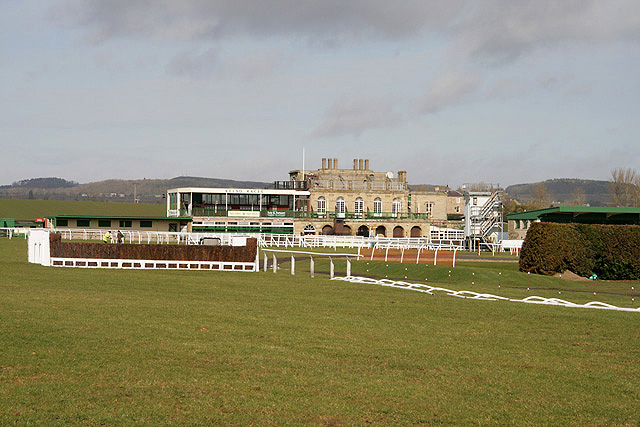
- Interactive map of Kelso
- Location: Kelso, Scotland
- Owned by: Kelso Races Ltd.
- Date opened: 1822
- Screened on: Racing TV
- Course type: National Hunt
- Notable races: Premier Kelso Hurdle

Kelso Racecourse is a thoroughbred horse racing venue located in Kelso, Scotland. It is frequently described as "Britain's Friendliest Racecourse". It was voted the Best Small Course in Scotland and the North of England in 2007, 2012 and 2014 by the Racegoers Club. In addition to staging Scotland's most valuable hurdle race, the Morebattle Hurdle, Kelso stages a comparatively high number of Class 1, 2 & 3 races over jumps.

== History ==
Horse racing in the Kelso area is recorded to have taken place sporadically since 1734 at Caverton Edge, five miles from the town; from 1760 meetings were held there regularly. The meetings at Kelso and Edinburgh were the only ones listed for Scotland in the first annual edition of Weatherby's Racing Calendar in 1773. The annual October meeting for 1793 was extended to six consecutive days and included the staging by the Caledonian Hunt of a prestigious King's Plate race of 100 guineas. Something of a "fiasco" occurred in 1803 when only three horses contested a four race meeting held over four days and each race was a walkover. In 1805 the first race was a walkover by a horse named Honest Starling, who then went on to beat sole rival Brandon for the King's Plate and won two four mile heats against the same rival on the third day. The prize of a Gold Cup was introduced for the first time in 1813. Owners tended to appreciate a trophy to show off more than the prize money, as they were mostly landed gentry of substantial means.

Races were also later held at Blakelaw but for only two years from 1821. In 1822, The Sporting Magazine reported that the Duke of Roxburghe had prepared land at Berry Moss (now Berrymoss) for a horse racing course. The foundation stone of the stand at the current racetrack at Berrymoss was laid on the 12 July 1822 and the first fixture took place on 16 April 1823. It was initially known as the Duke's Course. A local historian of the time noted the land on which the course was laid out was formerly boggy and imperfectly drained. A race for farmers' horses was introduced in 1828 and good-sized fields turned out for two such races in 1830.

The 6th Duke of Roxburghe gave permission for the racecourse to host pigeon shooting in December 1868; the event was known as the Great Border Pigeon Handicap. The joint winners each killed seven birds.

Kelso races were held under Jockey Club rules for flat racing. In 1883, the United Border Hunt moved to the course, fences for steeplechasing were built and National Hunt racing began. The course was extended over fields of the Hendershyde Park Estate to accommodate three of the steeplechase fences; hurdle races were run over the original track. In 1888 races at Kelso under Jockey Club rules ceased.

A paddock stand was erected in 1912. On 5 April 1913 suffragettes attempted to set fire to the stand but no damage resulted. Among those arrested in connection with the incident were Edith Hudson, Arabella Scott and Elizabeth and Agnes Thomson. They were all imprisoned at Calton jail and went on hunger strike together. Scott was released under the Cat and Mouse Act on 24 May.

New stands were erected in the members' enclosure in 1930. The course and facilities were requisitioned for military use in the Second World War. A new Members' Bar building was opened in 1966 in time for the early March meeting.

In 2018–19, Kelso became the first racecourse in Scotland to use artificial lighting to encourage the growth of grass on the course during the Winter months.

In 2022 and 2023 Kelso celebrated its bicentennial season which included a bicentennial race day on 17 April 2023 at which The Princess Royal was present.

== Layout ==
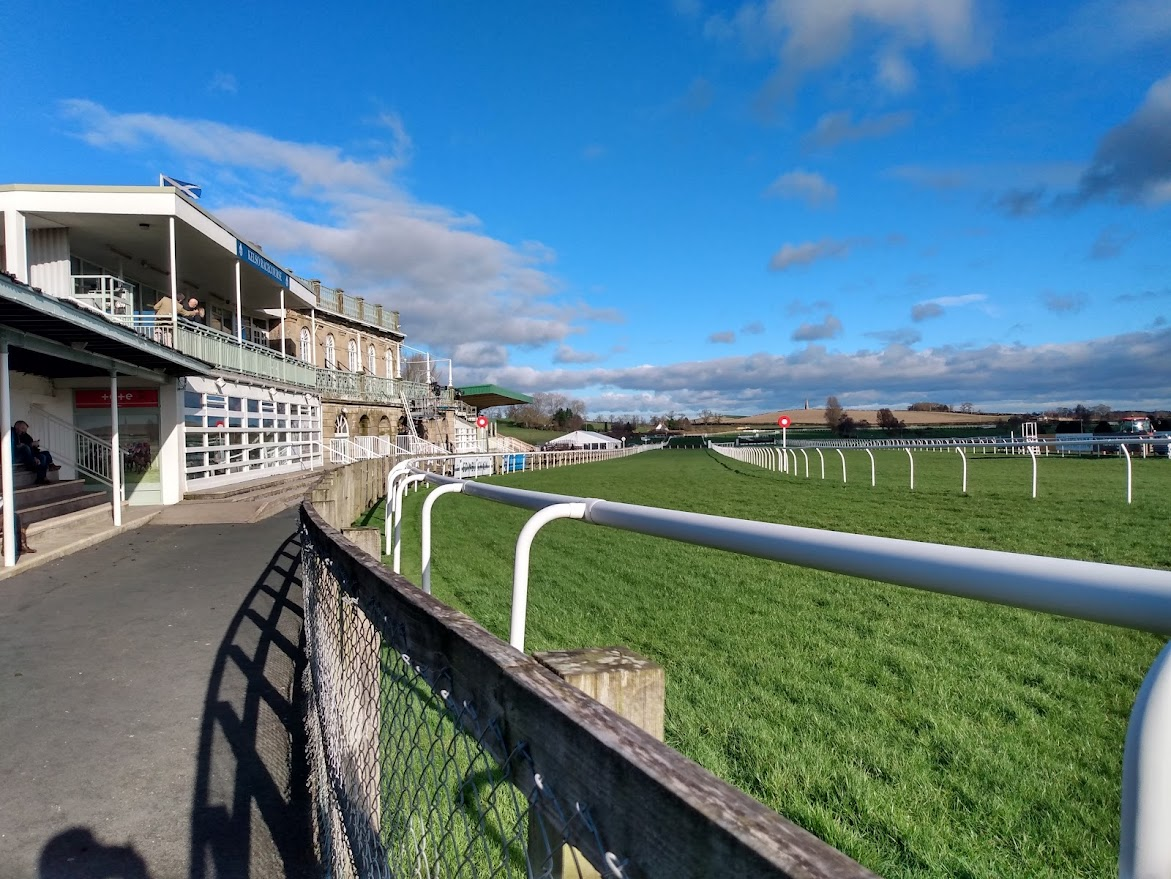
A view looking down the home straight

Kelso consists of two sharp, left-handed tracks - a chase track of 1 mile 600 yards and a hurdle course of 1 mile 330 yards. The course also has a punishing uphill run-in of 2 furlongs.

=== Grandstands ===
The classical style grandstand building was erected in 1822, though it was designed in 1778 by York-based architect John Carr (1723–1807). The building, incorporating a private viewing area for the races' patron the Duke of Roxburghe, remains largely unchanged since its construction. In 2011 it was protected by Historic Environment Scotland as a category A listed building, as "the finest example of its building type in Scotland and a particularly rare and important survival in a wider UK context."

The Tweedie Stand is named for Reg and Bettie Tweedie. Reg was a long-time chairman of Kelso Racecourse.

== Notable races ==
Month	DOW	Race Name	Type	Grade	Distance	Age/Sex
March	Saturday	Morebattle Hurdle	Hurdle	Class 2 handicap	2m	4yo +
March	Saturday	Premier Novices' Hurdle	Hurdle	Grade 2 pattern	2m 2f	4yo +

One notable steeplechase is the King's Own Challenge Cup, named after the King's Own Scottish Borderers who were based nearby. The longest established race still run at Kelso is a steeplechase for the Buccleuch Cup, founded in 1885 for maiden hunters. This race was won by Teal in 1951, who went on to win the 1952 Grand National under new ownership.

More minor races at Kelso have also entered the history books, including a race in 1990 won by Equinoctial at odds of 250/1, the longest-priced winner in British racing history at the time. In 2025, Blowers beat this record by winning at Exeter at 300/1, yet this was equalled at Kelso in 2026 by Crokes Cross, trained by Stuart Coltherd.

== Management ==
Kelso Racecourse is under the management of Kelso Races Limited, a not-for-profit private company. Its current managing director is Jonathan Garratt and its chairman is Mark Hunter. The company was incorporated on 17 March 1928 as The United Border Hunt Steeplechases (Kelso) Limited. The change of name was registered with Companies House on 18 December 1951.

== Golf course ==
The golf course partially laid out within the race course was originally a nine-hole course designed by Ben Sayers, then extended and redesigned by James Braid in 1930, and made into 18 holes in 1980. Some holes cross the race course. It is the home of Kelso Golf Club.

== See also ==
- List of Category A listed buildings in the Scottish Borders
- List of listed buildings in Kelso, Scottish Borders
