= Belinda Harrow =

Canadian artist

- Born: 1971 (age 54–55); Christchurch, New Zealand
- Awards: Royal Overseas Travel Scholarship (2000)

Academic background
- Education: University of Saskatchewan, Nova Scotia College of Art and Design, Canterbury University,
- Website: http://www.belindaharrow.com/

Belinda Harrow (born 1971) is a Saskatchewan based visual artist. She was born in Christchurch, New Zealand, and moved to Saskatchewan at the age of three. She works in a variety of mediums, such as: painting, installation, sculpture, printmaking, drawing, and fabric. Her works have been exhibited across Canada and internationally.

== Education ==
Harrow received her Bachelor of Arts in English from the University of Saskatchewan in 1993, a Bachelor of Fine Arts at the Nova Scotia College of Art and Design in 1996, and a Master of Fine Arts from University of Canterbury in 2005.

== Career ==
She has taught at the Design and Arts College of New Zealand, and was a guest lecturer at both Tshinghua University School of Art and Design and the National Institute of Design. She currently lives and works in Regina, Saskatchewan.

== Exhibitions ==
Giant Bingo (2016) is a multimedia installation that focuses on the similarities between the love lives of beavers and humans. Harrow specifically references the connections that beavers are monogamous, mate for life, and build and maintain homes together.

== Awards and grants ==
Harrow was the recipient of the Royal Overseas League Travel Scholarship in 2000, and the Jane Rounick Memorial Sculpture Award from the University of Canterbury in 2004.
