= Conciliation Bills =

Conciliation bills were bills proposing to introduce women's suffrage in the United Kingdom subject to a property qualification, which would have given just over a million wealthy women the right to vote in parliamentary elections. Three Conciliation bills were put before the House of Commons, in 1910, 1911, and 1912, but each failed.

After the January 1910 election, the Parliamentary Franchise (Women) Bill was drafted by a Conciliation Committee for Woman Suffrage, ultimately comprising 54 Members of Parliament (MPs — 25 Liberal, 17 Conservative, 6 Labour and 6 Irish nationalist), with Lord Lytton as chair and H. N. Brailsford as secretary. While the minority Liberal government of H. H. Asquith supported the bill, a number of backbenchers, both Conservative and Liberal, did not, fearing that it would damage their parties' success in general elections. Some pro-suffrage groups rejected the bills because they only gave the vote to propertied women; some MPs rejected them because they did not want any women to have the right to vote. Liberals also opposed the bills because they believed that the women whom the bills would enfranchise were more likely to vote Conservative than Liberal.

== Conciliation Bill 1910 ==
Prime Minister Asquith agreed to give the bill parliamentary time after pressure from the Cabinet. The bill passed its first reading. It passed a second reading on 12 July by 320 votes to 175. However, for committee stage it was referred to a Committee of the Whole House rather than to a public bill committee, which in effect meant it would never be passed within the parliamentary session. Further parliamentary progress became impossible on 18 November 1910, when Asquith announced a dissolution of parliament for 28 November and ensuing general election in December. The Women's Social and Political Union (WPSU) saw this as a betrayal, and their protest march later on 18 November became known as Black Friday.

== Conciliation Bill 1911 ==
The Second Conciliation Bill was debated on 5 May 1911 and won a majority of 255 to 88 as a Private Members Bill. The bill was promised a week of government time. However, in November Asquith announced that he was in favour of a manhood suffrage bill and that suffragists could suggest and propose an amendment that would allow some women to vote. On 21 November 1911, the WPSU carried out an "official window smash" along Whitehall and Fleet Street; its targets included the offices of the Daily Mail and the Daily News and the official residences or homes of leading Liberal politicians. The bill was consequently dropped.

== Conciliation Bill 1912 ==
The Parliamentary Franchise (Women) Bill was again introduced on 19 February 1912 and set down for Second Reading on 22 March, although the debate was later delayed to 29 March. However this time the bill was defeated by 208 to 222. The reason for the defeat was that the Irish Parliamentary Party believed that a debate over votes for women would be used to prevent Irish Home Rule. However, the WPSU blamed Asquith, as the eight members of the Government who had voted against the bill would have overturned the result had they voted the other way.

A Franchise and Registration Bill, for universal manhood suffrage, was introduced in 1912. On 27 January 1913, James Lowther, the Speaker, ruled that amendments relating to women's franchise were out of order, and the bill was withdrawn.

== See also ==
- Representation of the People Act 1918 - included partial enfranchisement of UK women
- Representation of the People (Equal Franchise) Act 1928 - included full enfranchisement of UK women

== Sources ==
Primary

Name of bill	Text of bill (Parliamentary sessional papers)	Proceedings relating to the bill	
Name of bill	Text of bill (Parliamentary sessional papers)	Hansard	House of Commons Journals
Parliamentary Franchise (Women) Bill 1910	HC 1910 iv (180) 325	Index 1 2 3	HCJ vol 165 pp. 172, 186, 204, 211, 225, 229, 236, 258, 261, 279, 286
Women's Enfranchisement Bill 1911	HC 1911 v (164) 923	Index 1 2	HCJ vol 166 pp. 20, 196, 203, 214, 223, 261
Parliamentary Franchise (Women) Bill 1912	HC 1912-13 iv (3) 201	Index	HCJ vol 167 pp. 17, 78, 87

Secondary

- Leventhal, F. M. (1985). "Conciliation Committee (1909–1913)". The Last Dissenter: H.N. Brailsford and His World. Oxford: Clarendon Press. pp. 67–91. ISBN 978-0-19-820055-0.
- Pankhurst, Christabel (1919). Pethick-Lawrence, Frederick (ed.). Unshackled: The Story of How We Won the Vote. London: Hutchinson. pp. 148–236.
