= Lila Clunas =

Scottish suffragette and politician

- Born: Maggie Eliza Clunas; 10 August 1876; Glasgow, Scotland
- Died: 29 December 1968 (aged 92); Dundee, Scotland
- Education: Moray House School of Education
- Occupation: Primary School Teacher
- Known for: Scottish suffragette and Labour Party councillor

Lila Clunas (born Maggie Eliza Clunas, 10 August 1876 – 29 December 1968) was a Scottish suffragette, educator, and Labour Party councillor. She was known as one of the leading suffragettes in Dundee.

== Biography ==
=== Early life and family ===
Lila Clunas was born in Glasgow on 10 August 1876, to parents Elsie Melvin and Hugh Clunas, a dress shop owner. Her sisters were Jessie Clunas and Elsie Clunas. She was schooled at Bell Baxter High School, Cupar, and completed her teacher training in Moray House Teacher Training College, Edinburgh. She then moved to Dundee where she taught at the Brown Street Elementary Public School. She was a part of the suffragettes in 1906 until 1914.

=== Middle years ===
Clunas served on the Dundee Board of Education.

=== Later life ===
In later life, she lived with her sister Elsie in Broughty Ferry.

== Political career ==
In 1906, she joined the Women's Social and Political Union (WSPU). The following year, she joined the Women's Freedom League (WFL), serving as the secretary of the Dundee branch between 1908 –1912. She was succeeded as secretary by Helen Wilkie. Her sisters were also involved with the WFL Dundee branch; Jessie was a member and Elsie served as treasurer until 1913. In 1909, she was a member of a 9-woman delegation to the House of Commons.

Her suffragette political activities included heckling, deputations, arrest and imprisonment, letter writing, and writing to the press. Later in life, she held office in city council and participated in avocation.

=== Heckling and deputations ===
In October 1907, Clunas heckled Chancellor of the Exchequer, H.H. Asquith while he was on a visit to Newport, Fife.

In November 1907, Clunas attended Rt Hon Edmund Robertson's address to constituents in Dundee's Gilfillan Hall with Agnes Husband and Annot Wilkie, in which Clunas asked Robertson if he was in favour of women's right to vote. When he said he was not, Wilkie moved for a vote of no confidence in Robertson.

In 1908 she was expelled from an election meeting for Winston Churchill. She picketed the House of Commons in 1909. In 1909, she joined the WSPU deputation in Caxton from the Women's Parliament, which led to arrest and imprisonment. In 1914 she was ejected from a Ramsay MacDonald meeting, and this led to a split between the suffragettes and the Dundee Labour Party. She continued to lead and participate in deputations, one to Winston Churchill and one to the Dundee MP.

=== Arrest and imprisonment ===
During the WSPU deputation in July 1909, she was arrested while presenting a petition to Prime Minister Asquith, although it has been suggested that she attempted to take a swipe at him. She was charged with obstruction and was sentenced to three weeks in prison. She was imprisoned in the London Holloway Prison, and was the first Dundee suffragette to be held there. She went on hunger strike, and was released early, "on consideration of all the circumstances and as an act of clemency".

=== Letter writing ===
In December 1908, Clunas began a sustained letter writing campaign to Winston Churchill, MP for Dundee and President for the Board of Trade. In anticipation of Churchill's upcoming visits to Dundee, Clunas, as Secretary of the Dundee's Women's Freedom League, was ‘directed to ask whether on the occasion of his next visit to Dundee Mr Churchill would receive a deputation from the Dundee Branch of the Women's Freedom League on the question of women's suffrage.’ After an initial refusal from Churchill, Clunas maintained correspondence with his Secretary throughout 1909, ultimately securing a 30-minute interview in October 1909 with nine members of the Dundee Women's Freedom League.

Clunas tried on 11 September 1912 to get into the hall in Dundee where Winston Churchill was about to give a speech, but she was not allowed to enter. She then instead fastened a card on her chest and went to the Post Office. She asked to be delivered by express message to the prime minister's residence. In 1909, the suffragettes Daisy Solomon and Elspeth McLelland tried to do the same, which resulted in the issue of a statement to the post offices in the London region to not accept such actions. However, this instruction did not reach Scotland, so Clunas' request was accepted at the post office. But, just as in 1909, her attempt to be actually delivered was refused.

=== Offices held ===
In 1943, she was elected as a Labour Party Councillor in the Dundee City Council, and served until 1964. She had an interest in education. She also advocated for libraries and parks.

== Death and legacy ==
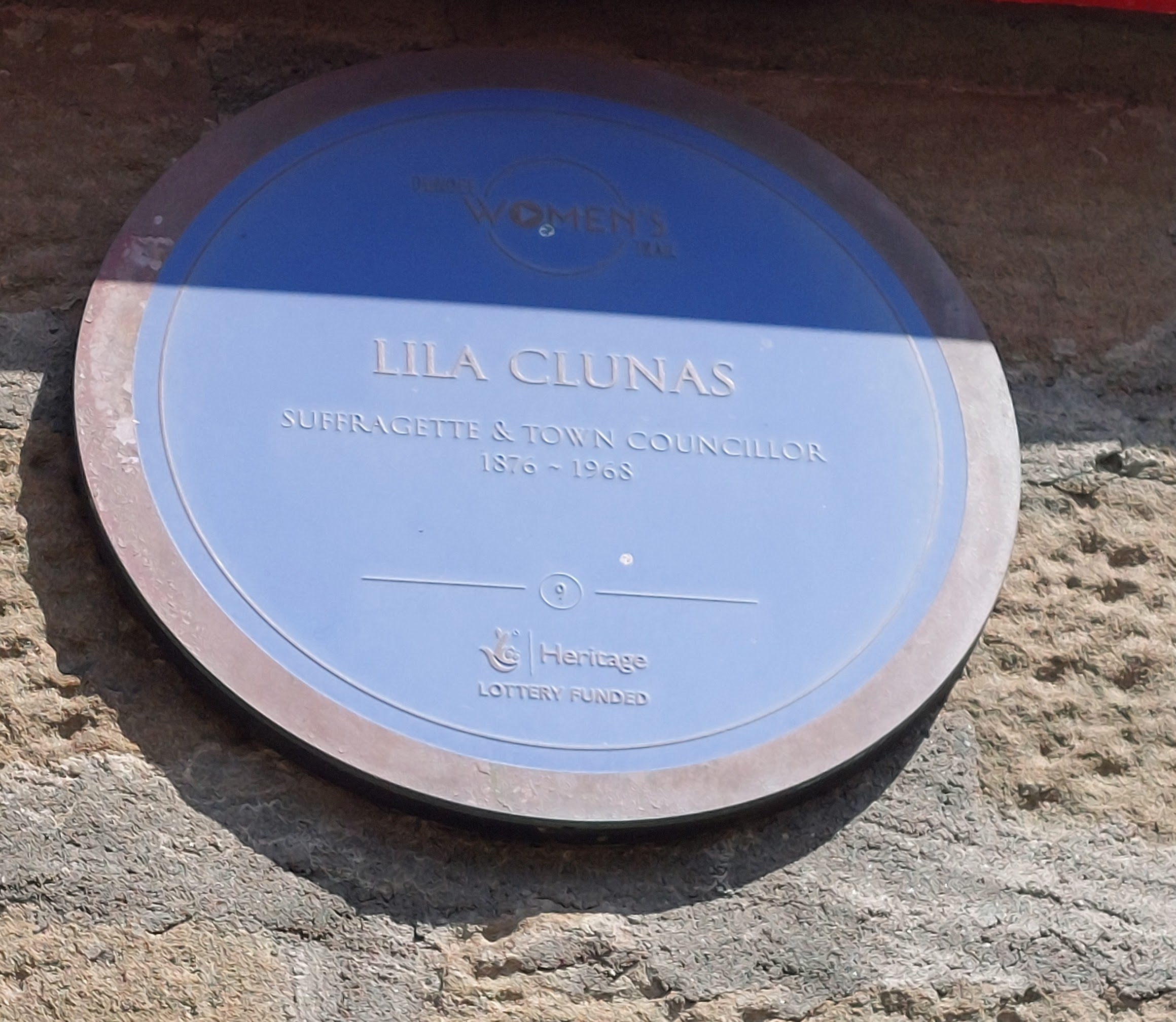
Plaque commemorating Lila Clunas at the former Brown Street Elementary School in Dundee.

Clunas died 29 December 1968 in Dundee.

In 2008, the building that was Brown Street Elementary School was marked with a commemoration plaque in Clunas's honour.

== See also ==
- Women's suffrage in the United Kingdom
