= Minerva Café =

Restaurant information
- Established: 1916; 110 years ago
- Location: 144 High Holborn, London, United Kingdom

The Minerva Café was a vegetarian cafe founded by suffragettes at 144 High Holborn in London's Holborn district.

== History ==
The Minerva Café, named after the ancient Greek goddess of wisdom, was founded by the Women's Freedom League in June 1916, and serving as its headquarters. The president of the group was vegetarian Charlotte Despard. According to Nick Heath in Libcom, the cafe produced a "considerable" profit used to fund the Women's Freedom League activities.

Anarchists, anti-war activists and socialists also met at the cafe. The British Socialist Party and the Communist Workers Party of Sylvia Pankhurst met there. Constance Markievicz spoke at the cafe in February 1923 at a meeting of the Irish Self-Determination League. The Australian writer Miles Franklin worked as a cook at the cafe.William C. Owen's Anarchist Discussion Group (connected to Freedom Press) met there 1922–1924.

In 1918, when the Representation of the People Act 1918 passed, the Minerva Café served a meal of vegetable soup, lentil cutlets, and rhubarb tarts.

Over a period of years, from the 1920s until at least 1938, Alice Green, secretary of the Emily Davison Club and her husband Basil Green were, with others, such as Charlotte Despard, Elizabeth Knight or Octavia Lewin, leaseholders of 144 High Holborn.

== See also ==
- Minerva Club
