= Minerva Club =

Residential members club

Coordinates: 51.524°N 0.123°W

The Minerva Club was a residential members club at 28a Brunswick Square in the Bloomsbury district of London. It was established by the Women's Freedom League (WFL) in 1920. The executive meetings of the WFL were held at the club into the 1930s. The club was still used residentially in the late 1940s. The Brunswick Centre now occupies the site, the building having been demolished in the late 1960s.

Elizabeth Knight and a Mrs Fisher founded the club. Knight was responsible for the funding of the club and the purchase of the long lease of the club's Brunswick Square premises. The restaurant of the club served vegetarian food. Fellow Brunswick Square resident E.M. Forster would frequently breakfast at the club. The WSL's Minerva Café moved to the club at Brunswick Square with the expiration of their High Holborn lease in the 1950s.

Marian Reeves managed the club from 1926. Reeves was politically well connected and often hosted international visitors at the club.

In 1926 the reunion meeting of the Suffragette Fellowship was held at the club. Annual birthday parties to raise funds for Charlotte Despard were held at the club with Despard herself travelling from Ireland each year to attend.
