= Ada Broughton =

British temperance campaigner, suffragette and alderman

- Born: 1879; West Derby, Liverpool, England
- Died: 1934 (aged 54–55); Liverpool, England
- Organization(s): Women's Freedom League, Women's Social and Political Union, British Women's Temperance Association
- Known for: her campaigning for temperance, as an organiser in the suffragette movement; Labour councillor and alderman

Ada Broughton (1879–1934) was a British temperance campaigner, suffragette organiser and Labour councillor and alderman, prominent in Scotland in the Women's Freedom League, and in England in the Pembroke Chapel, British Women's Temperance Association, Women's Social and Political Union, and later in the Labour Party.

== Early life ==
Ada Broughton was born in West Derby, Liverpool in 1879, the fourth of six children. After she left school, she worked as a cashier.

== Political history ==
Broughton was assistant secretary to the West Bermondsey Labour party, serving the branch for 16 years when she died in 1934. She was previously a lead organiser of the woman's suffrage movement; for example, she travelled widely as the Scottish organiser of the Women's Freedom League and helped English branches to organise prior to the First World War and also led the British Women's Temperance Association in Northumberland.

== Initial role in suffrage and temperance issues and arrest ==
The first record of her involvement in the suffrage movement is in the Women's Social and Political Union (WSPU) Votes for Women newspaper where the programme of events lists her as one of two speakers at the Wellington Column in Liverpool on 17 July 1908.

Broughton with others in the women's suffrage movement (such as Anna Munro) and in church circles ( like the Scottish Christian Union) believed that temperance was morally as well as practically important to improving society, and that stronger alcohol control laws would be brought in, if women had the vote.

The Liverpool Daily Post quotes her as saying that there was 'one law for the poor' and that 'rich people would not allow public houses near them' but were content to draw dividends from those that existed in far too great numbers in the poorer quarters.'

In 1909, Broughton was one of nine women arrested and charged for causing obstruction outside the House of Commons. They had in fact been trying to hand a petition to the Prime Minister. In court, Broughton asserted that she had been deputed by the Women's Parliament to deliver it. During the altercation, Broughton was alleged to have knocked off a police constable's helmet. All the defendants were ordered to find a £10 surety for three months or to go to jail in the Second Division for one month; they all chose the latter option.

By the same year, Broughton was also Secretary of the Pembroke Social Reform League, and President of the Liverpool Women Workers' Federation.

Temperance was the subject of a talk she gave in 1913 at Brothock Bridge (Arbroath). Broughton and Miss Shennan also addressed the question of 'the sweating system' of workers. In July of the same year, Broughton's speech in Forfar was reported extensively in the local newspaper. She was said to have stated that women were not recognised as citizens and were not free women, but 'bond-women'. During the same campaign, Broughton 'painted the streets [of Montrose] white with votes for women'. This, and subsequent support from a police constable, sent to advise her that this was against local by-laws, resulted in a crowd of 800 gathering to listen to her and Miss Shennan speak.

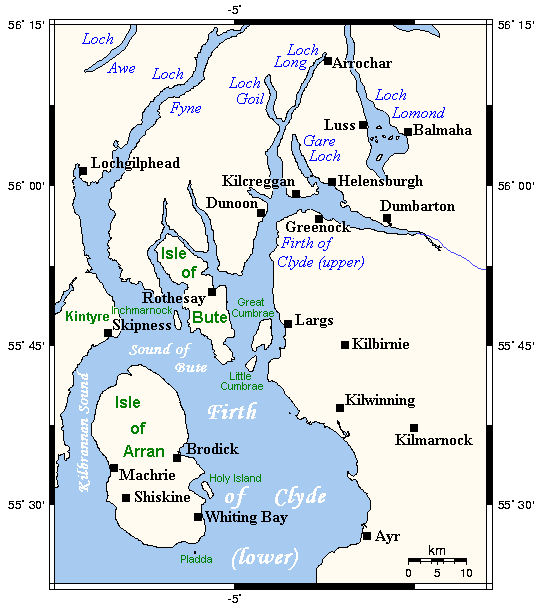
Clyde Coast map

During the summer of 1913, Broughton was a touring speaker in the annual 'Clyde Campaign' and the Women's Freedom League newspaper The Vote of 1 August 1913, notes that she spoke in Helensburgh and Gourock, and the following week she was made the organiser for 'Gourock and neighbourhood.'

In Townhill, near Dunfermline, she was 'the match' for a drunken man who had already knocked another speaker off her chair. Throughout the campaign, she was supported by Mrs Wattie, Jenny McCallum and Mr Michael Lee.

By September she was in the industrial Glasgow area of Govan, where she spoke at Govan Cross to a 'large and enthusiastic audience'.

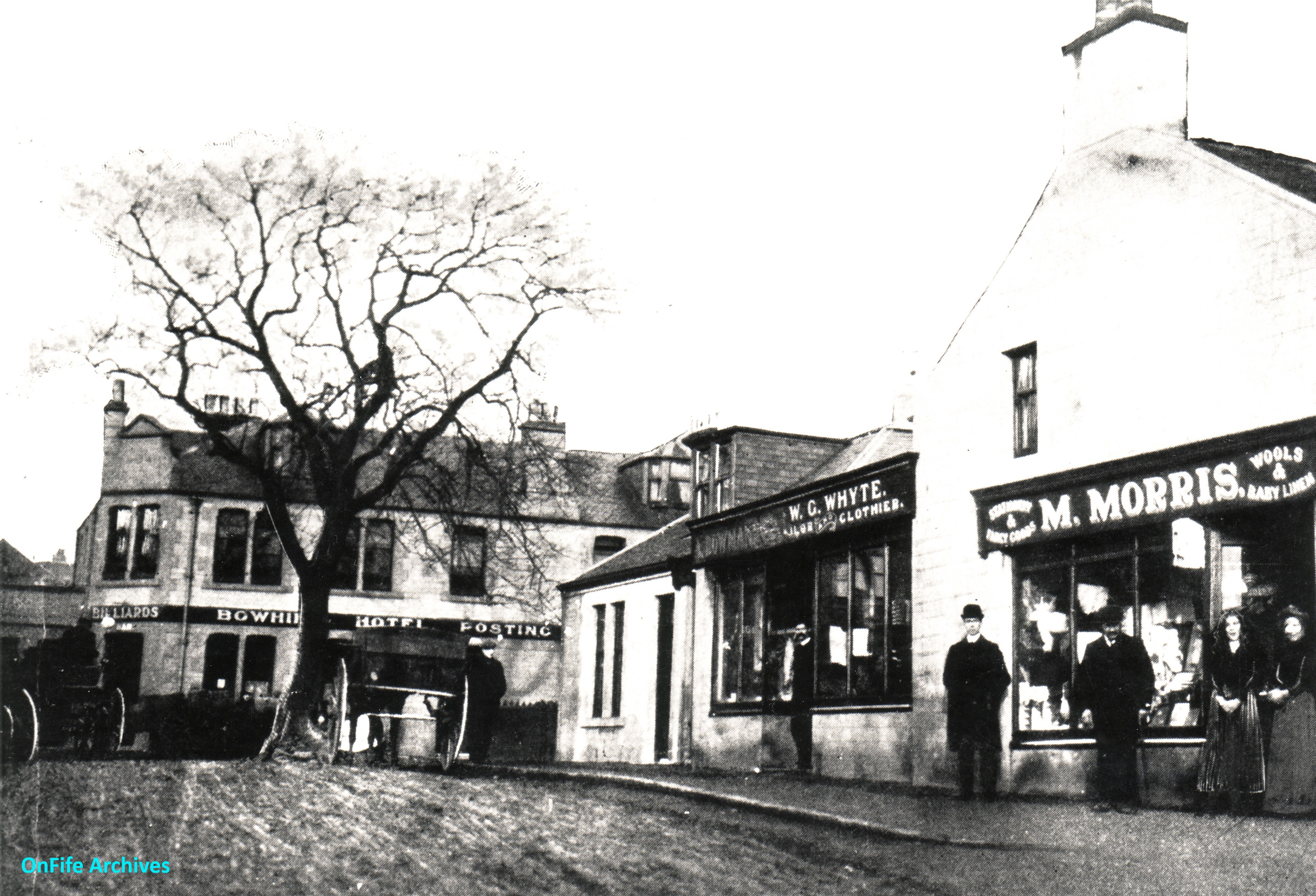
The Big Tree at Cardenden Fife where Ada Broughton spoke image: credit Fife Cultural Trust (Kirkcaldy Galleries) on behalf of Fife Council

In Fife, at another local landmark, 'the scene of many political meetings, quite big crowds took part in the debates'; namely the Reformers Tree in Cardenden, near Kirkcaldy, was the location for a meeting with a 'large and attentive audience'; followed by talks in nearby towns, resulting in a local branch being set up one week later.

In the latter part of 1913, Broughton was the organiser for WFL in the South Lanarkshire By-Election, speaking in (amongst other locations) Strathaven, Stonehouse, Lesmahagow and New Lanark. Even a snowstorm failed to stop her and her fellow speakers after addressing a meeting in Auchenheath, as she and the others walked 2 miles in the snow to their next meeting.

In 1914, Broughton made reference to the 'direct link' between women's vote and temperance laws in New Zealand during the course of a British Women's Temperance Association meeting in Cowdenbeath. Also the Albert Dock and Leith Walk in Edinburgh were open air locations where Broughton spoke in February 1914; the underlying theme was 'Keep the Liberals out'. In April 1914, Cupar and the surrounding area of Fife were 'covered in placards' by Broughton and Miss Bunten; East Fife was the constituency of the Prime Minister H. H. Asquith Several hundred female workers in Perth listened to Broughton during their dinner break when she held meetings outside local factories such as Pullars' Dye Works, Shields' and Campbell's in May 1914.

In the summer, Broughton was again 'organiser in charge' of the Clyde Campaign, visiting favoured holiday spots on the Clyde Coast from its base in Rothesay on the Isle of Bute during the months of July and August. Later in 1914, Broughton spoke at Abbey Close in Paisley on the subject of the Women's Suffrage National Aid Corps.

=== Developing WFL and temperance groups in England ===
Broughton also helped to re-establish local active women's suffrage groups in Liverpool in 1912, with Helah Criddle whilst Alice Davies was in prison. After holding several successful meetings, Broughton was appointed Honorary Secretary of the Liverpool Central Branch of the WFL. During 1915–16, with Isobel Buxton and Annie Marks, when the Pankhursts had refused to release control of funds or information to WFL from WSPU (which had stopped militancy on women's suffrage to support the war effort), Broughton continued to build up the local support. She spoke about 'The Economic Position of Women' in April 1915, at Walton Prince's Park branch of the Women's Co-operative Guild, and in Manchester explained about WFL policies at an 'at home' at the Higher Crumpsall home of Mrs Buckle, and addressed a large 'attentive' crowd at an open-air meeting in Sidney Street, with Janet Hayes. Broughton also spoke in Chester. Her involvement with temperance groups gave her an audience at the Liverpool Pioneer Lodge of the International Order of Good Templars to link 'The Temperance Movement and Woman's Influence' by going back into ancient history and looking up to date at other countries, arguing that women's suffrage was shown to support introduction of temperance legislation and also, as she expressed it, 'would protect the home'. Broughton was invited to speak to Girls' Clubs, for example, the Vauxhall Road club on 2 February 1915 and at Women's Guild and other groups across the city. She was also helping to start a campaign with Lillian Metge, who recognised her as an authority on 'the sober sex' and 'prohibition' and also had other activists (Dorothy Evans and Emily Davison) to launch a branch of the Women's Freedom League in Newcastle in 1917, of which Broughton became honorary press secretary and also addressed temperance groups in Alnwick and Tyneside Literary and Social Club.

== Later political career ==
Broughton moved to London in 1919, and was elected to Bermondsey Council (with four other women) as a Labour member and party whip. And in 1922, though defeated at election, she was made Alderman, and chaired the Maternity and Child Welfare Committee. She was judged a 'forceful speaker' with strong views on women's empowerment through citizenship, and was chosen as the woman's organiser for the Independent Labour Party, and then in the Labour Party became Secretary of the local women's section.

In 1932, she was secretary organising a Children's Sports and Gala Day in Southwark Park, attended by 600 children, and had organised sweet treats for all to be provided by the Labour Co-operative Bakery and the Royal Arsenal Co-operative Bakery.

By the time of her death, she had served Bermondsey as a Labour Party officer for sixteen years.

Broughton died in Liverpool in 1934, after contracting Scarlet fever.
