= The Vote (newspaper) =

Suffragist newspaper

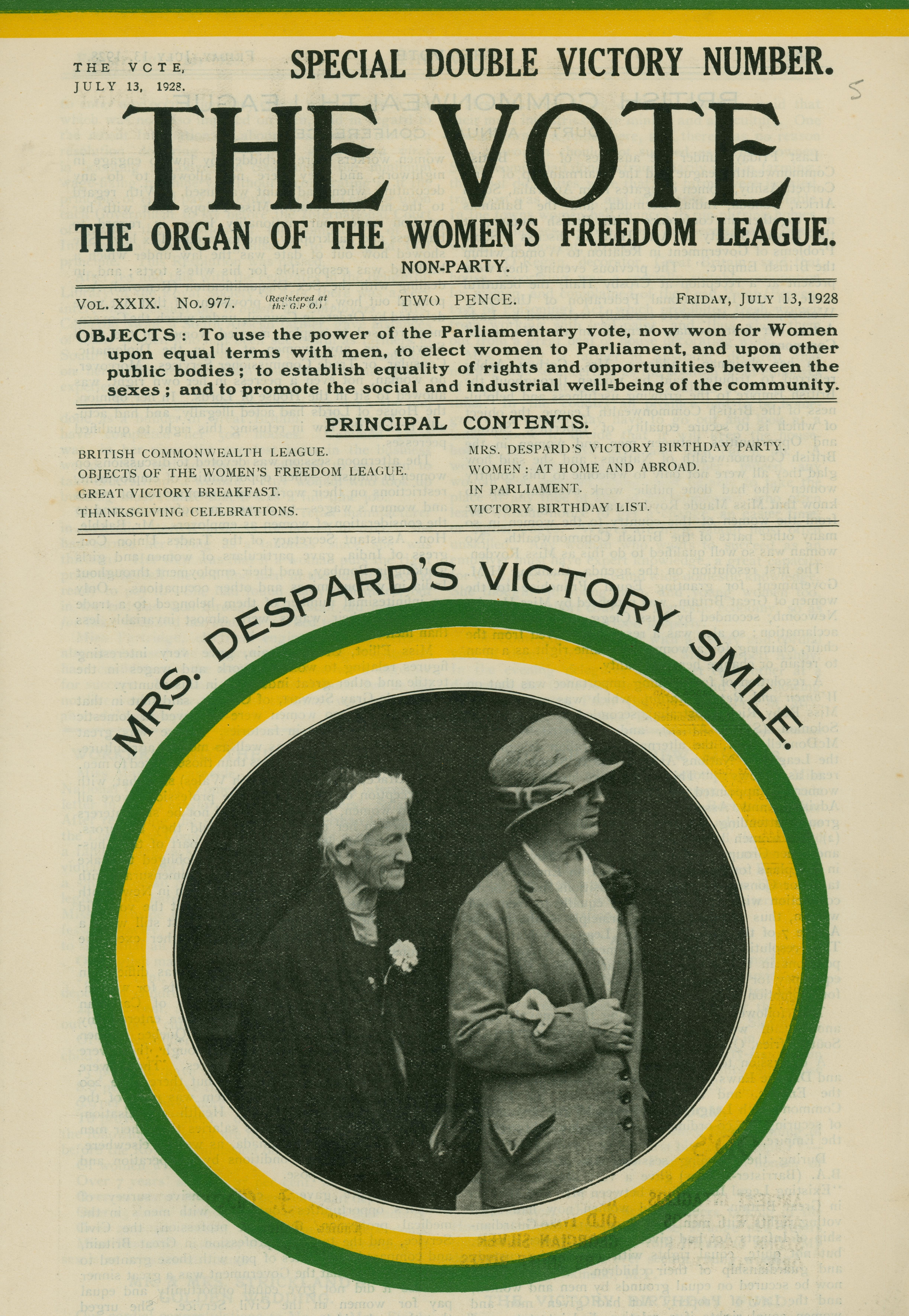
- The Vote. July 13, 1928 - front cover
- Type: Newspaper
- Founder: Louisa Thomson-Price
- Publisher: The Minerva Publishing Co., Ltd
- Editor: Cicely Hamilton, Marion Holmes, Elizabeth O’Connor, Mary Olivia Kennedy, Charlotte Despard Annie Smith, and Florence Underwood.
- Founded: 1909
- Ceased publication: 1933
- Political alignment: Suffragist
- Language: English
- Headquarters: London

The Vote was a suffrage newspaper that supported the Women's Freedom League. It was published from 1909 to 1933.

== History ==
In 1907 Emmeline Pankhurst announced that the Annual Conference of the Women's Social and Political Union (WSPU) would be cancelled and the organisation's committee replaced by one that she would hand-pick. This led to key members of the WSPU writing to Mrs Pankhurst insisting that the constitution be honoured, and the Conference be allowed to go ahead. Those members were Charlotte Despard, Edith How-Martyn, Caroline Hodgson, Alice Abadam, Teresa Billington-Greig, Marion Coates-Hansen, Irene Miller, Bessie Drysdale and Maude Fitzherbert. The request was refused, but the meeting went ahead on 12 October 1907 at Caxton Hall. Officers and committee members were duly elected for a new organisation. One of the group's first actions was to choose a name for the new organisation via a referendum of the branches. The name "Women's Freedom League" was announced in the Women's Franchise suffrage newspaper as the winning choice on 28 November 1907.

The League then decided to publish its own newspaper, and the first edition of The Vote was published on 8 September 1909, consisting of four pages. Within two months it had expanded to eight pages. The main writers for The Vote were Teresa Billington-Greig and Charlotte Despard. Louisa Thomson-Price was consultant editor, and Cicely Hamilton was notionally the first editor, but in practice the joint first editors were Marion Holmes and Elizabeth O'Connor. Mary Olivia Kennedy was editor 1910-1911. She was replaced by Charlotte Despard, in turn replaced by Annie Smith 1911-1920, and Florence Underwood in 1920.

After the extension of the franchise to women over the age of 21 in 1928, The Vote continued, agitating for greater equality for women. However, sales fell dramatically and the newspaper only continued to be published because it was subsidised by Elizabeth Knight and Helena Normanton. In 1933 Knight was injured in a road accident, dying as a result, and the newspaper folded soon thereafter.

== See also ==
- Women's suffrage in the United Kingdom
