= Amy Sanderson =

Scottish suffragette

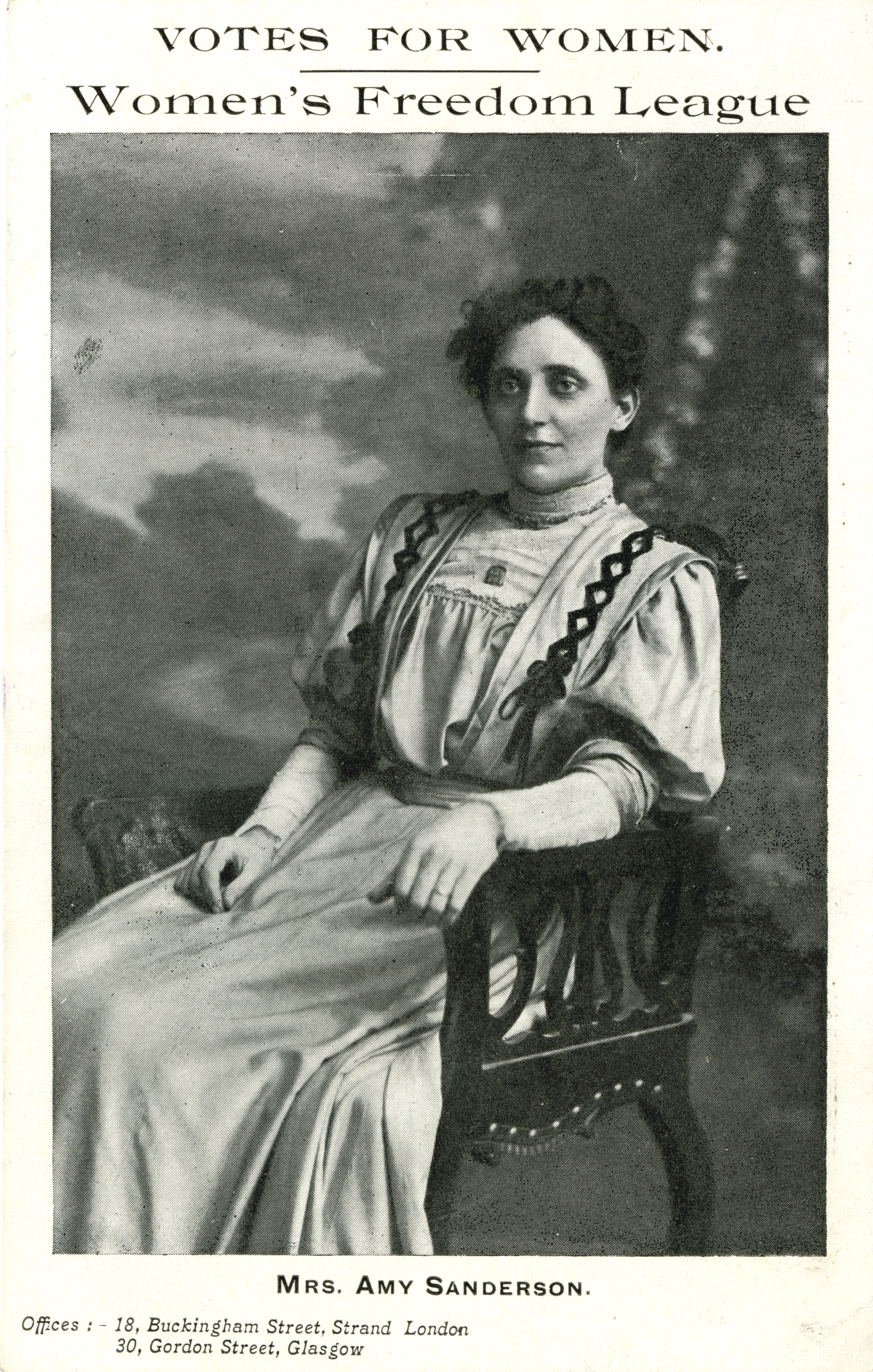
- Sanderson in 1907
- Born: Amy Reid; 1876
- Died: 1931 (aged 54–55)
- Organisation(s): Women's Freedom League and Women's Social and Political Union and delegate to 1908 and 1923 International Alliance of Women
- Known for: Suffragette activism and women's rights
- Relatives: One of six siblings
- Awards: Holloway brooch

Amy Sanderson née Reid (1876–1931), was a Scottish suffragette, national executive committee member of the Women's Freedom League, who was imprisoned twice. She was key speaker at the 1912 Hyde Park women's rally, after marching from Edinburgh to London, and, with Charlotte Despard and Teresa Billington-Greig, was a British delegate to the 1908 and 1923 international women's congresses.

== Family life ==
Born Amy Reid in 1876 in Bellshill, North Lanarkshire to father James Reid (born 1838) a spirits cellarsman (or hotel keeper) from Kincardine, Perthshire and mother Janet Reid née Kerr, also born 1838, from Glasgow. Her grandfather was a Chartist. By the 1881 Census, the Reids were living at 94 Muir Street, Dalziel, Lanarkshire. Amy Reid was one of six siblings, five older than her: Mary W. Reid born 1860, Elizabeth Reid (a shopwoman) born 1862, Andrew Reid (a chemist's assistant) born 1864, Bertha Reid born 1876 and a younger brother James F. Reid born 1876. The family had English boarders: the Horsman family (Charles Horsman, Ellen Horsman -both comedians - and their 13 year old daughter Ellen Maud ), Harry Thomas (also a comedian), and Mary Fortescue described as a 55 year old widow annuitant.

She married James Sanderson, a wireworker journeyman, on 10 August 1901 at Trinity Congregational Church, Glasgow.

Amy Sanderson died in 1931.

== Suffrage activism ==
Sanderson joined the Women's Social and Political Union (WSPU) in 1906 and was arrested at the 'Women's Parliament' militant protest at the House of Commons in 1907. She started speaking at events in Scotland on behalf of WPSU. In October 1907, she joined the break-away Women's Freedom League (WLF) and served on its national executive committee for three years. She wrote that most of the Scottish branches of WSPU became affiliated to WFL. Sanderson was asked by the headquarters to go urgently to Aberdeen and wrote to Caroline Phillips the local organiser, due to differences in opinion on tactics, and was regarded as a good organiser for new territory for suffrage activism (in Forfar), by WFL leader Theresa Billington-Greig.

In February 1908, Sanderson was arrested a second time and imprisoned for a month in Holloway Prison in London, with others in a small militant group who had accosted Prime Minister H.H. Asquith at his home in Cavendish Square. She was given a Women's Freedom League Holloway brooch (which is different from the WSPU Holloway brooch designed by Sylvia Pankhurst) for being imprisoned for the cause of women's votes.

In 1908, she went to Dunfermline where she spoke along with Anna Munro, Mrs Donaldson and Mrs Duguid to an audience who were said to be 'most sympathetic and attentive, expressing entire approval of the militant tactics.' Sanderson also spoke at Kilmarnock and in the Prince of Wales Halls, a large venue in Glasgow, where she was introduced by Miss Husband of Dundee. Sanderson (and again Anna Munro) shared some of the details of their prison experiences and she particularly emphasised the need for prison reform as something that women should vote for (once they had won the vote). She also shared part of a hymn the women had sung in the prison:

'The tall trees in the greenwood,

The meadows where we play,

The rushes by the water,

We gather every day,

In Holloway!'

Campaigning in the area of Stonehaven, Sanderson reported as enjoyable despite heckling from fisher families, remarks from road repairers and yet many 'happy smiles' and waves from some, as Anna Munro and she cycled the area with bicycles showing placards of 'Votes for Women', 'Keep the Liberals Out', Taxation without Representation is Tyranny', and the pair were thinking 'what a blessed change from Holloway Prison'. Of course the election was not won, but at a later large meeting, launching a WFU branch in Perth, Sanderson spoke about the 'loss' of the election in Kincardine as being due to a conservative attitude in Liberal voters (voting the same way as fathers and grandfathers) and about being disappointed that the Women's Unionist Association there had not promoted women's suffrage as an election issue. She was interviewed after the event and reported as saying that many more women were supporting the movement, but that the militant tactics are deferred pending 'responsible members of the Government' making a positive move to enfranchise women, without which 'we will proceed with even greater vigour than before'. In June 1908, Sanderson was with Theresa Billington-Greig, and Charlotte Despard as delegates in Amsterdam at the 4th Conference of the International Suffrage Alliance, where she spoke of the negative attitude of the British government, and of the middle class women, which led to the Alliance voting to hold its next meeting in London.

During 1909, Sanderson's role was in organising the Yorkshire and Durham branches and as a touring platform speaker, with upcoming public events widely publicised and commented on in the local press. In Sheffield, where a man was heard to say that the suffragettes ' look like women with a purpose' and local press saw the women's issues as to the fore in the election, or in Pontefract where there were 'flippant elements' but Sanderson was said to have 'held the attention of the intelligent portion of the audience all through', her speaking tour progress was reported to the WFL. She had a successful three day speaking tour of Manchester, where M. E. Manning reported that 'Mrs Sanderson's eloquence carried all before it, and in each case the meeting was almost unanimous in its support.' Sanderson's Scottish tour had included Forfar, where she had lived for a time, and where she bemoaned lack of adequate support for the campaigning work she was doing but she quoted the reactions to seeing women chalking the pavements, ringing bells and mounting lorries to speak in public, with remarks from men and women in the local dialect, some finally saying 'Ca awa, wifie, yer daein fine'. In Stonehaven where she went with Anna Munro, she found a 'hotbed of Liberalism'. At an open-air meeting in Hartlepool, she held the crowd's attention for 90minutes, explaining the arguments for women's suffrage and for equal pay for equal work. She was reported as saying that female factory workers and teachers are paid less than men for the same or better quality of work. Sanderson debunked the popular arguments of the anti-suffrage case, including that suffragettes are all 'old maids' when in fact most were married women, who had ' the best husbands in the world, or else we could not be suffragettes. A woman who was used as a doormat or a slave could not be a suffragette, because she was afraid to call her soul her own.' As well as open air meetings, Sanderson spoke at the 'At Home' events such as in the Portman Rooms, London, where she had been buoyed up by the enthusiasm there for the cause, encouraging her for speaking in towns and villages where there was little or no awareness of the women's suffrage issues.

Sanderson's speaking tour in 1910 included a drawing room meeting in Sunderland and a public meeting in South Shields with Alice Schofield Coates and speaking at the WFL branch in Harrow and at the founding of an Eccles Branch. At a mass rally in Trafalgar Square on 3 April 1910, Sanderson was one of the main speakers focussing on 'politics', with fellow activists Muriel Matters and Emma Sproson; at an open air meeting in Regent's Park where she was reported to have 'held the crowd as much by her earnestness as by her logical arguments'. In June 2010, ten Scottish branches of WFL were represented in the 'great procession' of ten or twelve thousand women, seven hundred banners and forty bands; Sanderson was grouped with the 617 'prisoners' or 'martyrs' proceeding to Hyde Park. The Scottish banner said 'What's guid for John is guid for Janet'.

Later that year, Sanderson was writing in The Vote strongly criticising the Labour Party before the next election, for ''a curious mixture of earnest championship, lukewarm support, indifference and hostility'. Referring to the party's duty to working class women, Sanderson said:

'Surely the women who have fought so determinedly during the last four years, who have been reviled and abused, imprisoned and tortured for asking simple justice, have a claim on a party that champions sweated workers, 82 per cent of whom are women.'

The 1910 WFL Conference report refers to the active engagement of the provincial and Scottish representatives; Sanderson is pictured with the National Executive Committee and WFL President Mrs Despard at Caxton Hall. Sanderson's speech there was wider than women's suffrage, talking about work opportunities and quoting the police force in Indiana, USA who had female patrol beat officers, a point which was supported by chair, Archdeacon Escreet. She also spoke up for joint male/female administration of all kinds of laws, in the best interest of society, and about the risks of a 'personality' culture.

In March 1912, Sanderson had returned to activism after a period of illness, and spoke at the WFL Conference which sent congratulations to women's organizations in Washington and California on their achievements of votes for women, the previous year.

In October 1912, she was involved in the 'Brown March' from Edinburgh to London, speaking to the group passing through York, where they had gathered signatures from 36 out of 48 councillors to a petition for votes for women. Sanderson then joined the women's groups from all over the country gathering in their thousands in Hyde Park, where she was one of the leading speakers at the mass rally.

When World War One began, suffragette prisoners, including Sanderson, were pardoned by the British government in return for stopping their militancy.

A decade after founding of WFL, the organisation looked back at its troubled beginnings as a split from WSPU and thanked its first executive committee.

== International delegate ==
In May 1923, Sanderson was again a delegate at the Congress of the International Suffrage Alliance this time in Rome, Italy where women had no voting rights at all. The Congress was opened by Mussolini, whom she reported to be so impressed by the scope of the international event and the women's procession that he 'promised, if he is in power next year, to give the municipal vote to the women of Italy'.' The brief report of her talk to the Edinburgh Branch of WFL commented 'Even a Dictator is not sure of himself in these days, apparently.' and said Sanderson was a 'valuable' addition to the branch.

== Images ==
Sanderson was photographed in prison by the police (image is in the Museum of London) and her 1907 posed photograph, wearing the Holloway brooch was used in publicity postcards for WSPU. (Note: one of these cards was advertised for sale in 2017 for £130+VAT, and by auctioneers Rogers Jones in 2019, for an estimated £100–£160).

== See also ==
- Feminism in the United Kingdom
- List of suffragists and suffragettes
- List of women's rights activists
- List of women's rights organizations
- Timeline of women's suffrage
- Women's suffrage organizations
