= Women's Peace Council =

The Women's Peace Council was a group that, during World War I, campaigned for a negotiated end to the conflict. The group's membership was mainly from the Women's Freedom League, a group made up of suffragettes. Many of its members were also pacifists. The Women's Peace Council was founded in 1915 because the leaders of the Women's Freedom League believed that the British government's anti-war efforts were insufficient in ending conflict during World War I and they wanted to bring about negotiated peace. The newly formed Women's Peace Council is a rebirth of the Women's Peace Council from World War I, but it is now a global organization dedicated to peace and well-being, led by women. Their Facebook page describes the purpose of the group as follows: "The Women’s Peace Council will bring together people from different backgrounds to imagine a world without fear and hatred." The co-founders of the newly formed Council are Tezikiah Gabriel, Jayne Hillman, and Deborah Greene. The Charter Members include Dimah Mahmoud, Rosa Davis, Kath Knight, Tracy Chapman, and Jennifer Carolyn King.

== Current-Day Activism ==
3 June 2019: The Women's Peace Council organized the "People's Banquet," or "Peace banquet," held in Parliament Square in London, to protest the visit of President Trump and his participation in the state banquet. This event was a partnership between the Women's Peace Council and ActionAid UK. Those participating were asked to wear blue and bring white flowers to represent peace. Speakers, singers, and other performers were part of the event, including a feminist fortune-teller.

== Notable Members ==
Charlotte Despard: Women's Peace Council member and notable British suffragette. Despard was one of the original organizers for the Women's Freedom League and one of the organizers of the Women's Peace Crusade in 1916. Despard was also the 1918 Labour Party candidate in Battersea in the election after World War I, but she lost the election due to her unpopular pacifist, anti-war political views. She then went on to become the secretary for the Friends of Soviet Russia organization in 1930.

Helen Crawfurd: Member of the Women's Peace Council and one of the organizers of the Glasgow branch of the Women's International League in 1915. She was also one of the organizers for the Women's Peace Crusade in 1916. In 1920 she was one of the founders of the Communist Party of Great Britain, and in 1927 she helped establish the League Against Imperialism.

Teresa Billington-Greig: A member of the Women's Freedom League who went on to join the Women's Peace Council. She was appointed organizer of the Independent Labour Party in Manchester in 1904 and spent much of her life fighting for the rights of working-class women.

Margaret Grace Bondfield: Member of the Women's Peace Council and Britain's first female cabinet minister; she served as the Minister of Labor in a government led by the Labour Party. Bondfield dedicated her life to working to improve conditions and salaries for working women and campaigning for women's right to vote. In 1906, she helped to found the Women's Labour League and held positions in the Adult Suffrage Society, the National Union of Shop Assistants, and the Women's Labor League.

== Timeline ==
1907 – Official members of the Women's Social and Political Union (WSPU), which is a UK based organization, questioned Emmeline Pankhurst and Christabel Pankhurst, the leaders of WSPU. Members felt as though their leading members had too much influence over the organization. Months later in a September conference, Emmeline Pankhurst made it clear she'd continue being in charge of WSPU.

Also in 1907 – Close to 80 members left the WSPU and formed the Women's Freedom League (WFL), which was also a militant organization.

1914 – By this point there were about 4,000 members within the WFL, most pacifists, and so they turned down any chance to be involved in British Army's recruitment campaign. The WFL organization as a whole felt as though the government was not doing enough to bring the war to an end. It is because of this that they then supported the Women's Peace Crusade's campaign for negotiated peace.

4 August 1914 – It was two days after the British government declared war on Germany that the National Union of Suffrage Societies (NUWSS) declared no political activity would be permitted until the conflict was over.

1915 - Those within the Women's Freedom League founded the Women's Peace Council for a negotiated peace.
