= Christian Farquharson-Kennedy =

Scottish teacher, socialist and suffragist

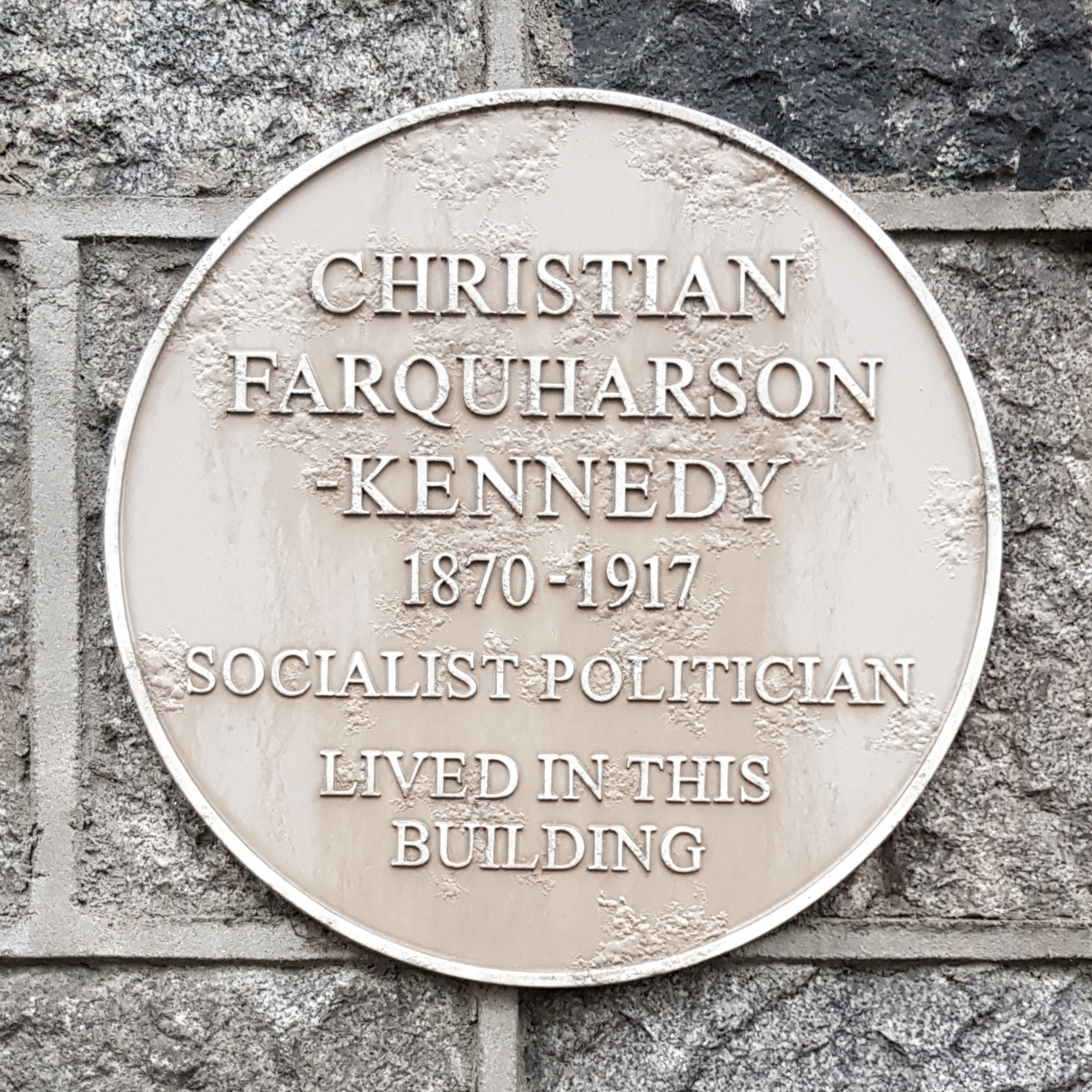
- Born: Christian Elizabeth Farquharson; 27 February 1870; Spital, Old Aberdeen, Scotland
- Died: 16 July 1917 (aged 47); Aberdeen, Scotland
- Occupations: Teacher, socialist and suffragist
- Organization(s): Aberdeen School Board; Scottish School Boards Association; Women's Freedom League; Working Women’s Political Association; Associated Women’s Friendly Society; Aberdeen Clarion Club
- Political party: Social Democratic Federation (SDF); British Socialist Party (BSP); National Socialist Party (NSP)
- Spouse: Tom Kennedy (m. 1902)

Christian Elizabeth Farquharson-Kennedy (née Farquharson, 27 February 1870 – 16 July 1917) was a Scottish teacher, socialist and suffragist.

== Biography ==
Farquharson-Kennedy was born on 27 February 1870 in Spital, Old Aberdeen, Scotland.

Farquharson-Kennedy was a schoolteacher in Aberdeen who taught at Woodside School then at Kittybrewster School. She was a member of Aberdeen School Board from 1906 until her death alongside being a member of the Executive of the Scottish School Boards Association.

Farquharson-Kennedy was a socialist and member of the Social Democratic Federation (SDF) political party, before joining the British Socialist Party (BSP) and breakaway BSP group National Socialist Party (NSP). Farquharson-Kennedy was active in other political organisations including the Aberdeen branch of the Women's Freedom League (WFL), Working Women's Political Association, Associated Women's Friendly Society and Aberdeen Clarion Club. She also supported the carter's strike in 1897 and attended the 5th International Socialist Congress, Paris 1900.

In 1902, Farquharson-Kennedy married socialist politician Tom Kennedy in Marylebone, London.

Farquharson-Kennedy died on 16 July 1917 from tubercular peritonitis, shortly before women got the vote. A memorial service to her was held at Aberdeen Unitarian Church on 12 August 1917.

== Legacy ==
A memorial prize was established in Farquharson-Kennedy's honour from 1920.

In 2006, Aberdeen City Council erected a commemorative plaque in Farquharson-Kennedy's honour at Westburn Drive in Aberdeen where she once lived.
