= Women's Freedom League =

British organization for women's rights

- WFL Colours Green, White & Gold; Dare to be Free

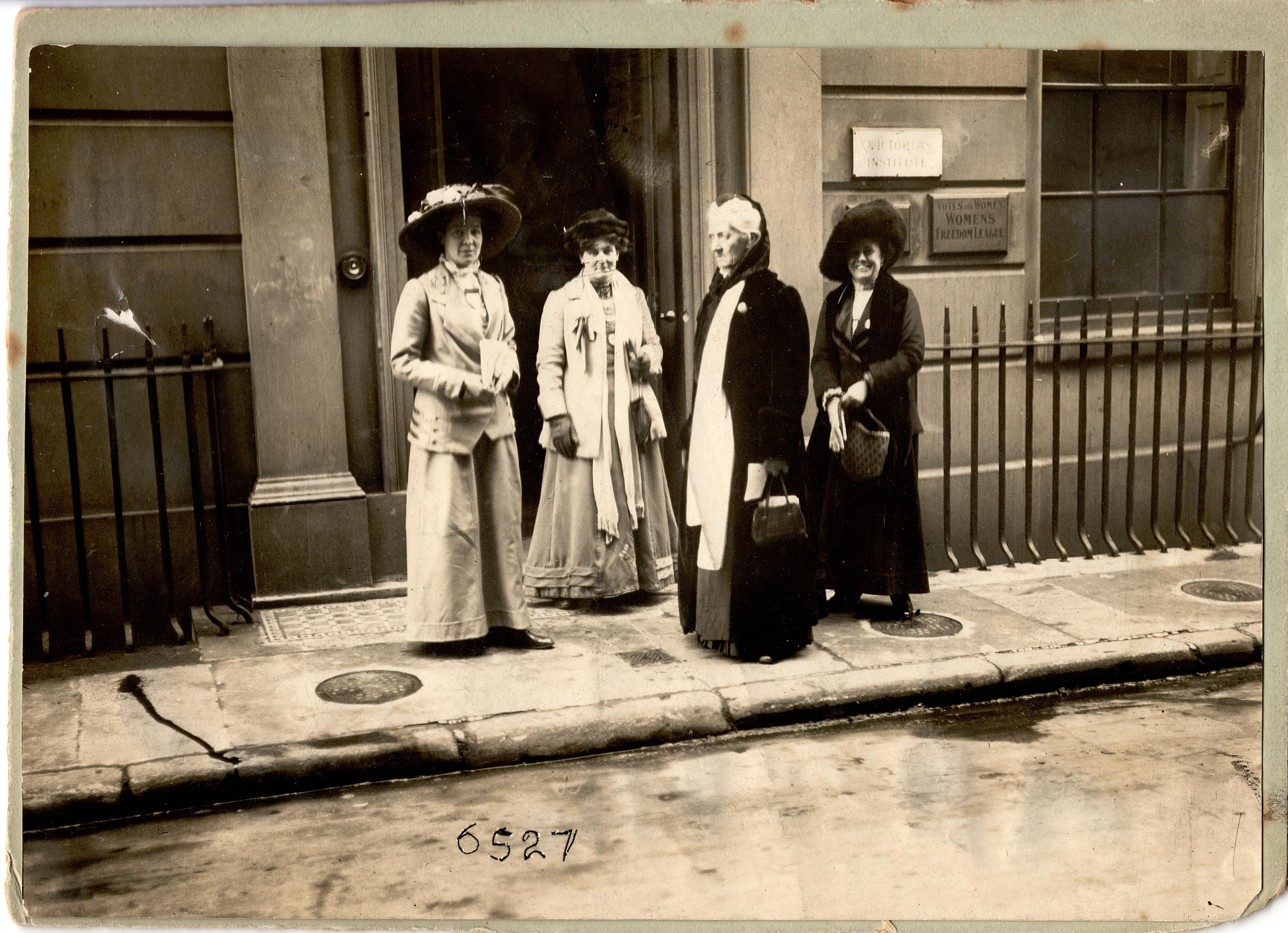
- How-Martyn, Sproson, Despard, & Tite outside the WFL office at the Victoria Institute
- Abbreviation: WFL
- Predecessor: Split from WSPU
- Formation: 12 October 1907
- Founders: Charlotte Despard; Edith How-Martyn; Caroline Hodgson; Alice Abadam; Teresa Billington-Greig; Marion Coates-Hansen; Irene Miller; Bessie Drysdale; Maude Fitzherbert
- Dissolved: 1961; 65 years ago
- Type: Political movement for women's rights and Votes for women
- Headquarters: 1 Robert Street, Westminster, London
- Location(s): 30 Gordon Street, Glagow, 144 High Holborn, London
- Region served: United Kingdom
- Methods: Demonstrations, marches, direct action, hunger strikes, standing for election.
- President: Charlotte Despard (1907)
- Publication: The Voice
- Website: WFL Parliament Site

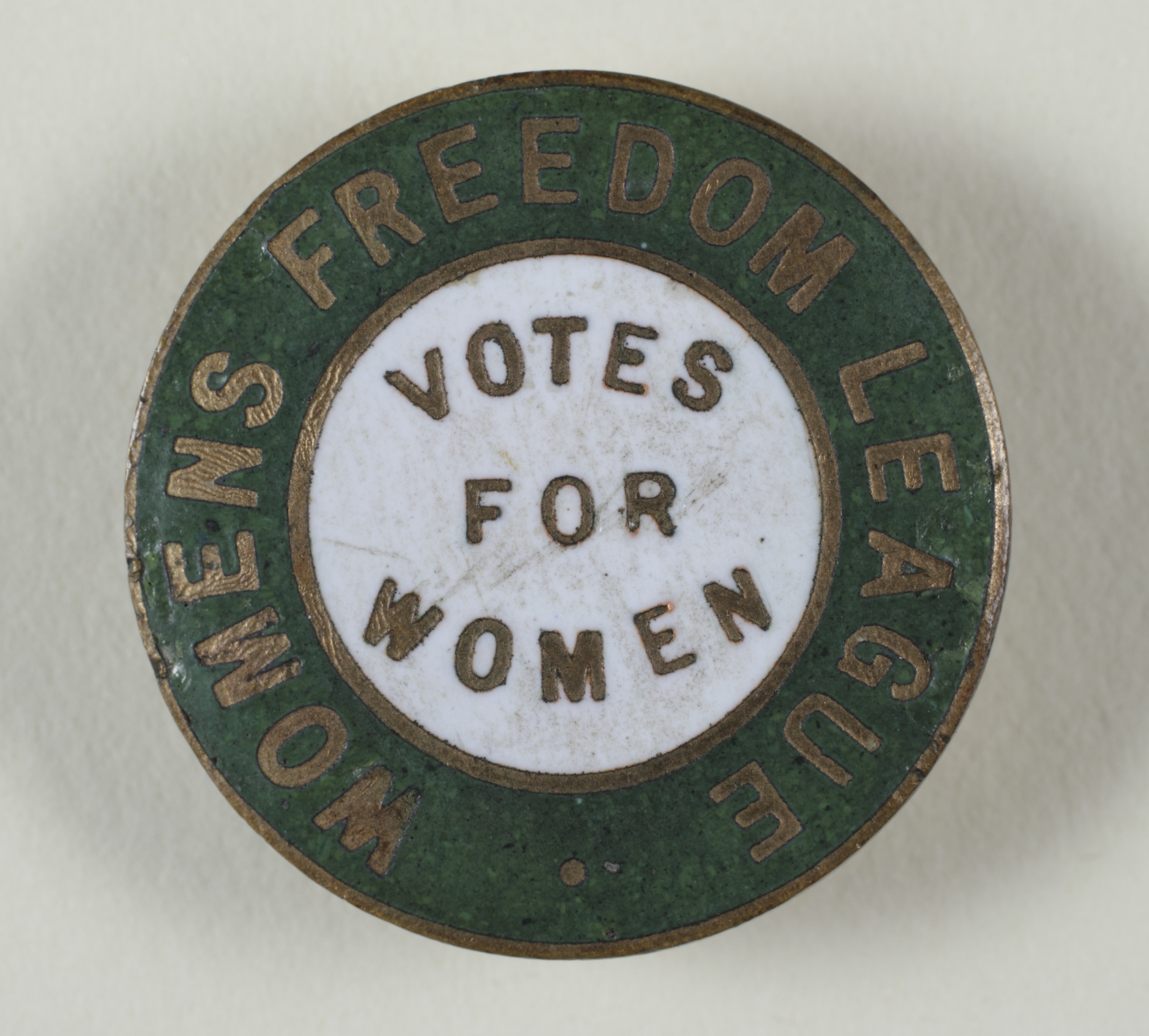
Votes For Women badge

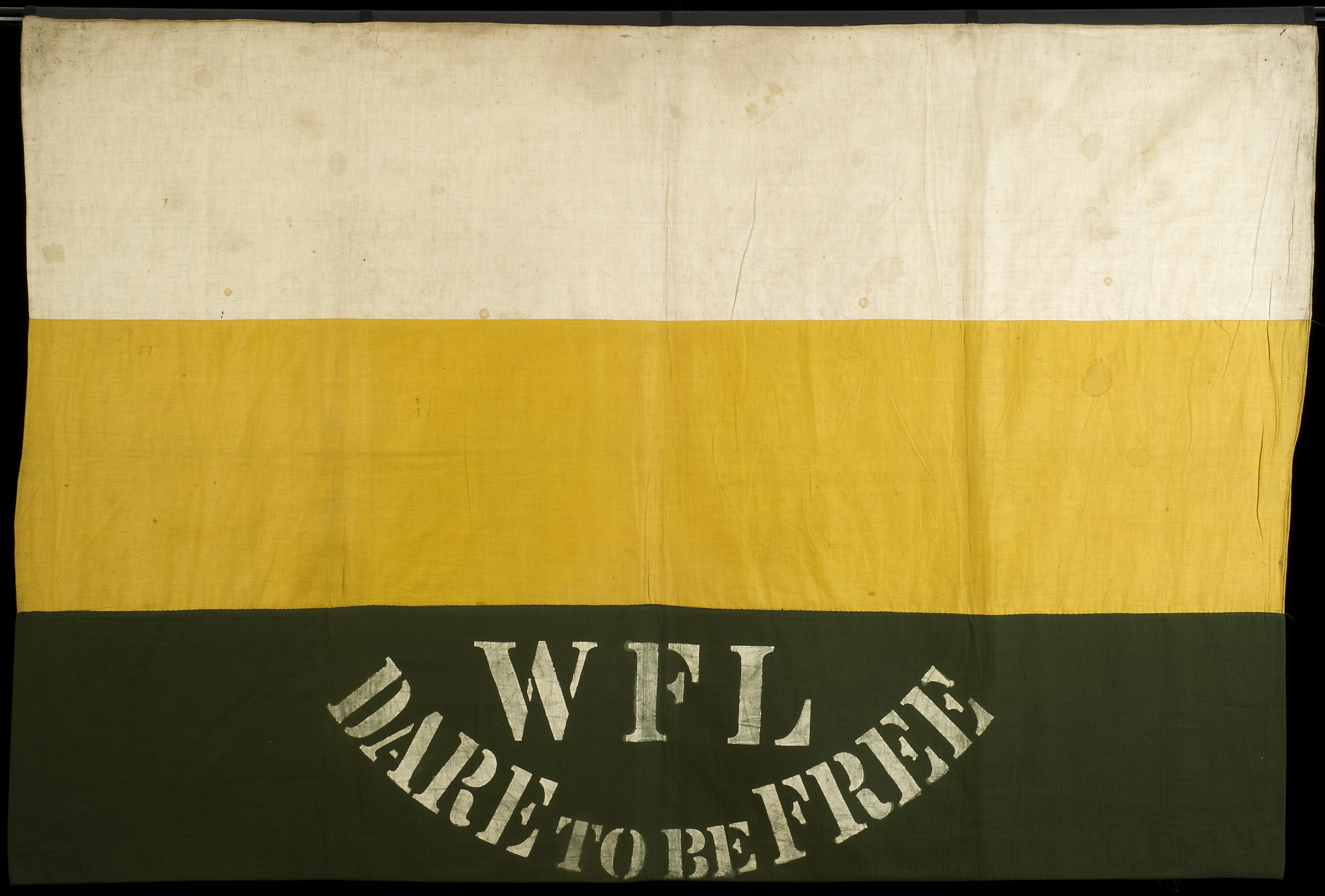
Dare to be Free, Women's Freedom League flag c. 1908

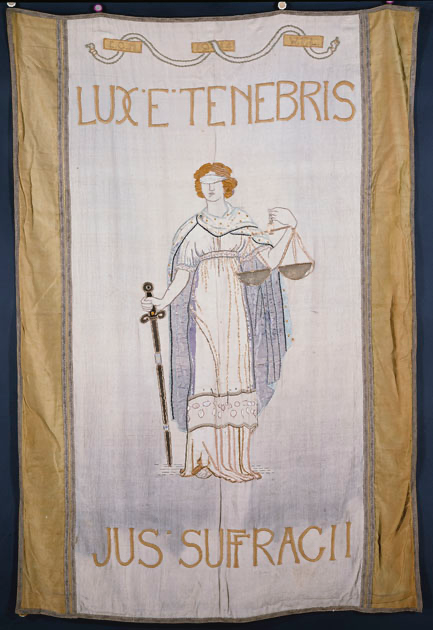
Embroidered and machine stitched banner of the Women’s Freedom League

The Women's Freedom League was an organisation in the United Kingdom from 1907 to 1961 which campaigned for women's suffrage, pacifism and sexual equality. It was founded by former members of the Women's Social and Political Union after the Pankhursts decided to rule without democratic support from their members.

== Foundation and naming ==
After the announcement that the 1907 Annual Conference of the Women's Social and Political Union (WSPU) would be cancelled and the organisation's committee replaced by one hand-picked by Emmeline Pankhurst, a meeting was held to discuss the unconstitutional action in Eustice Miles' restaurant, a vegetarian restaurant in Chandos Street, Charing Cross, near the Strand. As a result, a letter dated 14 September 1907 and signed by Charlotte Despard, Edith How-Martyn, Caroline Hodgson, Alice Abadam, Teresa Billington-Greig, Marion Coates-Hansen, Irene Miller, Bessie Drysdale and Maude Fitzherbert was sent to Mrs Pankhurst insisting that the constitution be honoured, and the Conference be allowed to go ahead.

The Pankhursts refused the request, however the meeting was still held on 12 October 1907 at Caxton Hall. Officers and committee members were duly elected for a new organisation, with Charlotte Despard as President. One of the group's first actions was to choose a name for the new organisation via a referendum of the branches. The name "Women's Freedom League" was announced in the Women's Franchise suffrage newspaper as the winning choice on 28 November 1907.

== Objectives and ethos ==
The League's main objectives were stated in a banner on the front page of The Vote. From 1909 until 6 July 1928, this read:

OBJECTS: To secure for Women the Parliamentary Vote as it is, or may be, granted to men; to use the power thus obtained to establish equality of rights and opportunities between the sexes, and to promote the social and industrial well-being of the community.

After the Representation of the People (Equal Franchise) Act 1928 became law, the banner changed from 13 July 1928 issue to read:

OBJECTS: To use the power of the Parliamentary vote, now won for Women upon equal terms with men, to elect women to Parliament, and upon other public bodies; to establish equality of rights and opportunities between the sexes, and to promote the social and industrial well-being of the community.

The League opposed violence in favour of non-violent forms of protest such as the non-payment of taxes, refusing to complete census forms and organising demonstrations, including members chaining themselves to objects in the Houses of Parliament.

The League continued their pacifism during the First World War, supporting the Women's Peace Council. On the outbreak of war, they had suspended their campaigns and undertook voluntary work.

== Growth of the Women's Freedom League ==
The Women's Freedom League grew rapidly throughout Great Britain. In October 1909, How-Martin wrote in The Times that the League consisted of sixty-five branches and had nearly five thousand members, and many more sympathisers.

== Leadership and organisation ==
Sarah Benett was the League's Treasurer until her resignation in 1910. In 1912, Dr Elizabeth Knight took over as Treasurer from Constance Tite and improved the WFL's financial situation. Before her appointment, the League suffered serious financial problems and on occasions had to appeal to its members for loans. Knight introduced new fundraising schemes for the League. However, finances were also improved by large donations by an "anonymous" person. It is suspected that this person was Knight.

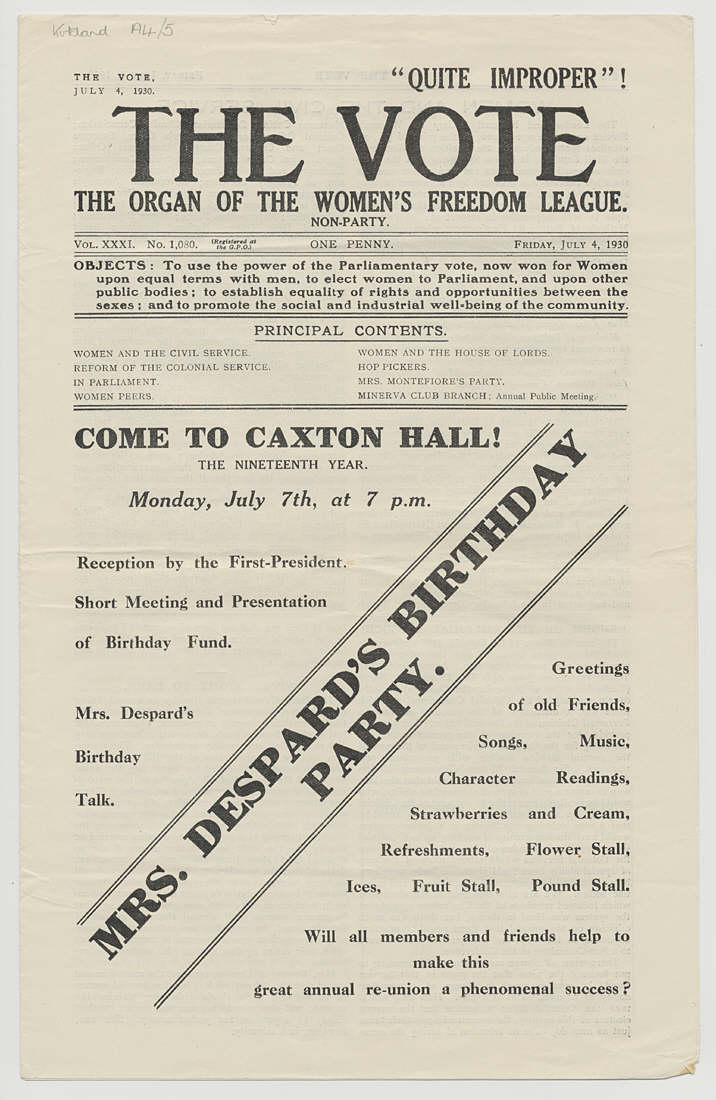
4 July 1930 issue of The Vote

In 1912, Nina Boyle became head of the WFL's political and militant department. Boyle started a campaign for women to become Special Constables. This campaign coincided with the outbreak of the First World War in 1914 and the call for volunteers for the war effort which Boyle wished to see taken up by women as well as men. When the request was officially refused, Boyle, together with Margaret Damer Dawson, a wealthy philanthropist and herself a campaigner for women's rights, established the first voluntary women's police force-the Women Police Volunteers (WPV).

The executive committee included women from around the country, such as Amy Sanderson, a Scottish suffragette and Marie Lawson, a British suffragist. Marie Lawson, as well as WFL members, Alice Schofield-Coates and Muriel Pierotti talked to the historian, Brian Harrison, about the League in interviews undertaken as part of the Suffrage Interviews project, titled Oral evidence on the suffragette and suffragist movements: the Brian Harrison interviews.

== Communications and publications ==
Initially, the league published their communications and notices in Women's Franchise. These appeared alongside news from the National Union of Women's Suffrage Societies and the Men's League for Women's Suffrage from October 1907 until October 1909, when the League established its own newspaper, The Vote.

Members of the League who were writers led the production of the newspaper. Louisa Thomson-Price supplied the first cartoon in 1909. The Vote became the primary means of communication with the public, informing readers of campaigns, protests, and events. The newspaper helped to spread ideas concerning the First World War, allowing for the Women's Freedom League to advocate against the war. Members of the League refused to become involved in campaigning efforts led by the British Army. Members were upset when the women's suffrage campaign came to a halt while the war was in progress.

== Protests and events ==
=== Parliament and chains ===
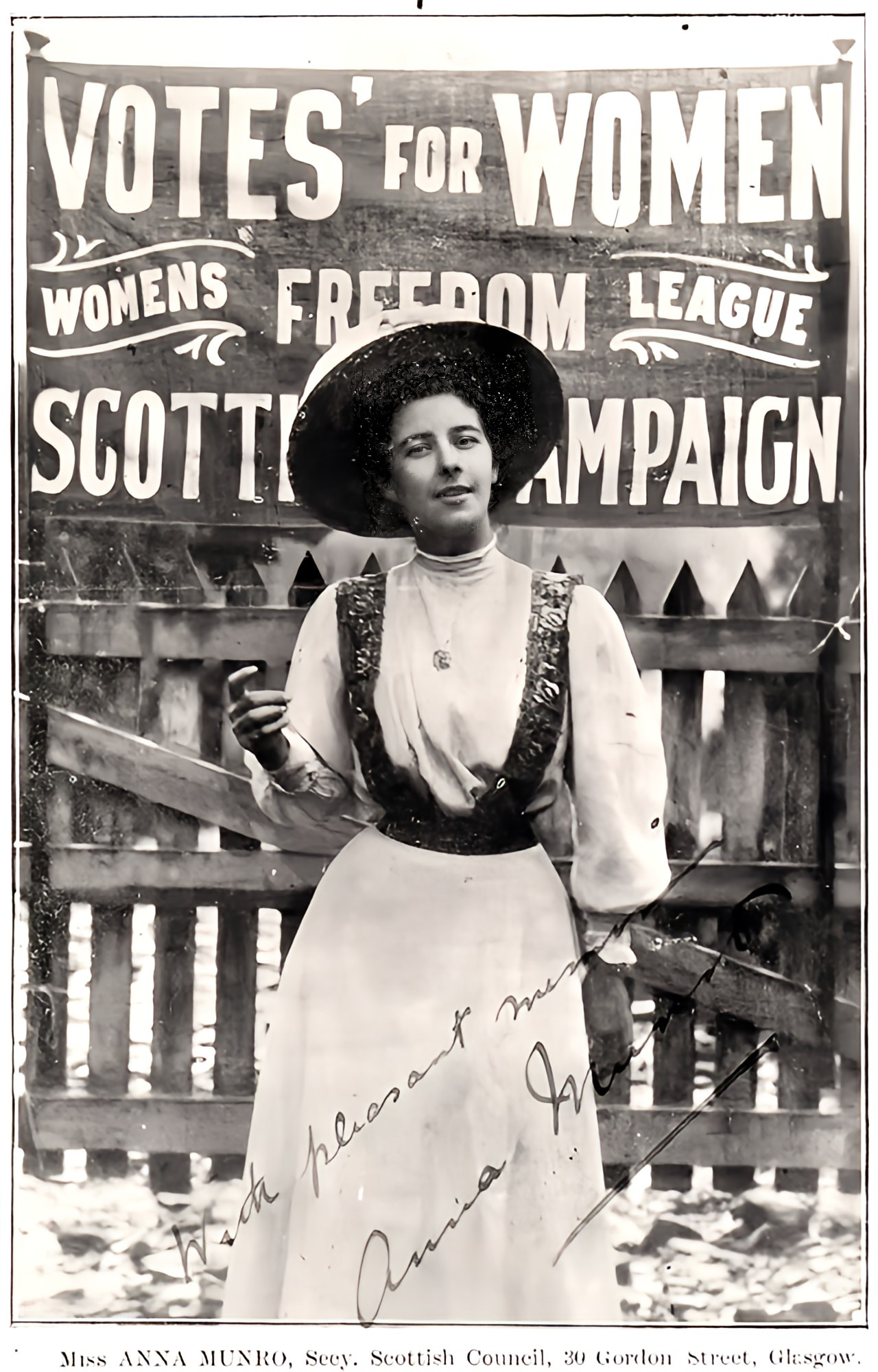
Anna Munro speaking in front of a banner of the Women's Freedom League Scottish Campaign

In 1908 and 1909, members of the League chained themselves to various objects in the House of Commons in protest.

On 28 October 1908, three members of the Women's Freedom League, Muriel Matters, Violet Tillard, and Helen Fox, participated in the infamous Grille Incident at the Palace of Westminster where the women released a banner at the House of Commons, and chained themselves to the grille above a window.

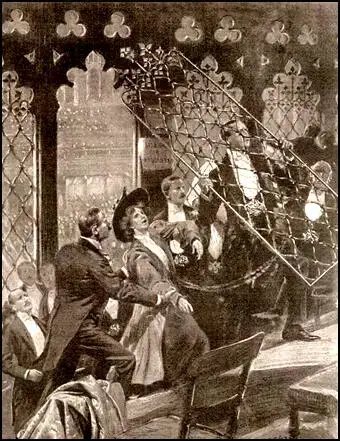
The London Illustrated News illustration of the grille incident, 1908

Law enforcement had to remove the grille while they were still attached until they could file off the locks that held them connected to the window. This protest became known as the Grille Incident.

The WFL introduced "Holloway" brooches in later 1908. Janet McCallum's brooch is dated 28 October 1908 and Muriel Matters and Emily Duval were awarded theirs in December 1908. The WSPU borrowed the idea in April 1909.

=== Balloon Raid ===
In 1909, Muriel Matters and the WFL organised the Balloon Raid, which was a non-violent protest event that took place over the skies of London on Tuesday, 16 February 1909, during King Edward VII's royal procession from Buckingham Palaceto the Palace of Westminster for the official State Opening of Parliament.

=== Bermondsey by-election ===
Two members of the League, Alice Chapin and Alison Neilans, attacked polling stations during the 1909 Bermondsey by-election, smashing bottles containing corrosive liquid over ballot boxes in an attempt to destroy votes. A presiding officer, George Thornley, was blinded in one eye in one of these attacks, and a Liberal agent suffered a severe burn to the neck. The count was delayed while ballot papers were carefully examined, 83 ballot papers were damaged but legible but two ballot papers became undecipherable. Later they were sentenced to three months each in Holloway Prison.

=== More chains ===
Suffragette sisters Muriel and Arabella Scott chained themselves to their seats at a political event and spoke out on behalf of WFL and WSPU policies, at by-election hustings across Scotland.

=== 400 mile walk ===
In 1912, actress Florence Gertrude de Fonblanque organised a 400-mile walk from Edinburgh to London. Anna Munro spoke at their departure from Charlotte Square on 12 October. The walkers wore brown uniforms and marched beneath a banner showing the route and objective of their march, which was to solicit signatures for a petition stating:

"We, the undersigned, pray that the Government will make itself responsible for a Bill to give votes to women this session"

The "Brown Women" were named after the brown coats that the walkers wore. Agnes Brown (coincidentally), Isabel Cowe and four others set off from Edinburgh to walk to London. They had white scarfs and green hats and as they travelled they gathered signatures for a petition for women's rights. The hikers had to walk fifteen miles and attend a meeting each day and in this way they took five weeks to get to London. They arrived in London on 16 November to a welcome parade which led the group to Trafalgar Square. Dr Ethel Smyth's The March of the Women was played to accompany them. De Fonblanque took the petition to Downing Street.

=== Other protests and events ===
The League also held protests that advocated pacifism during the First World War.

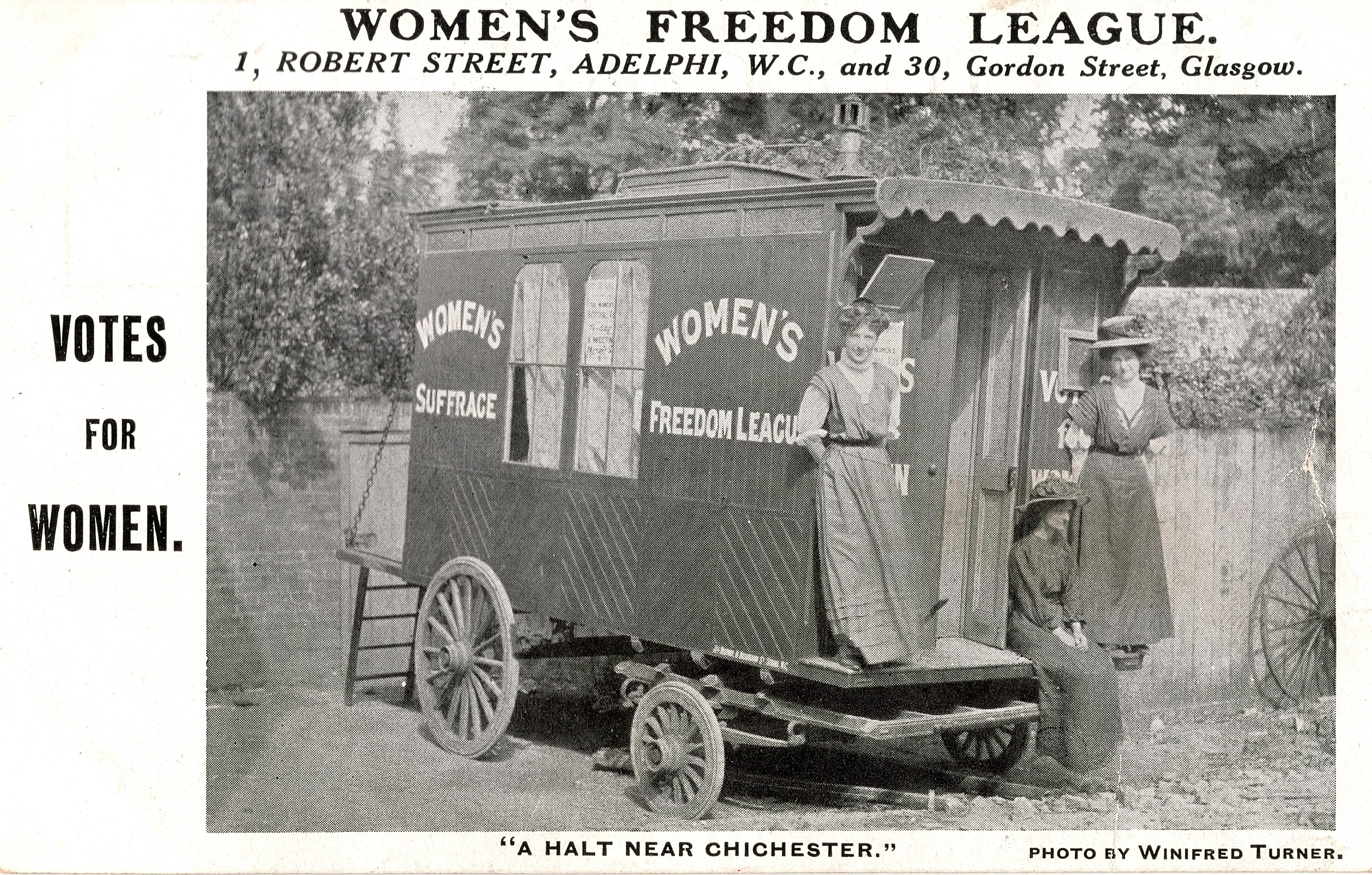
Promotional material from the Women's Freedom League caravan tour (1908)

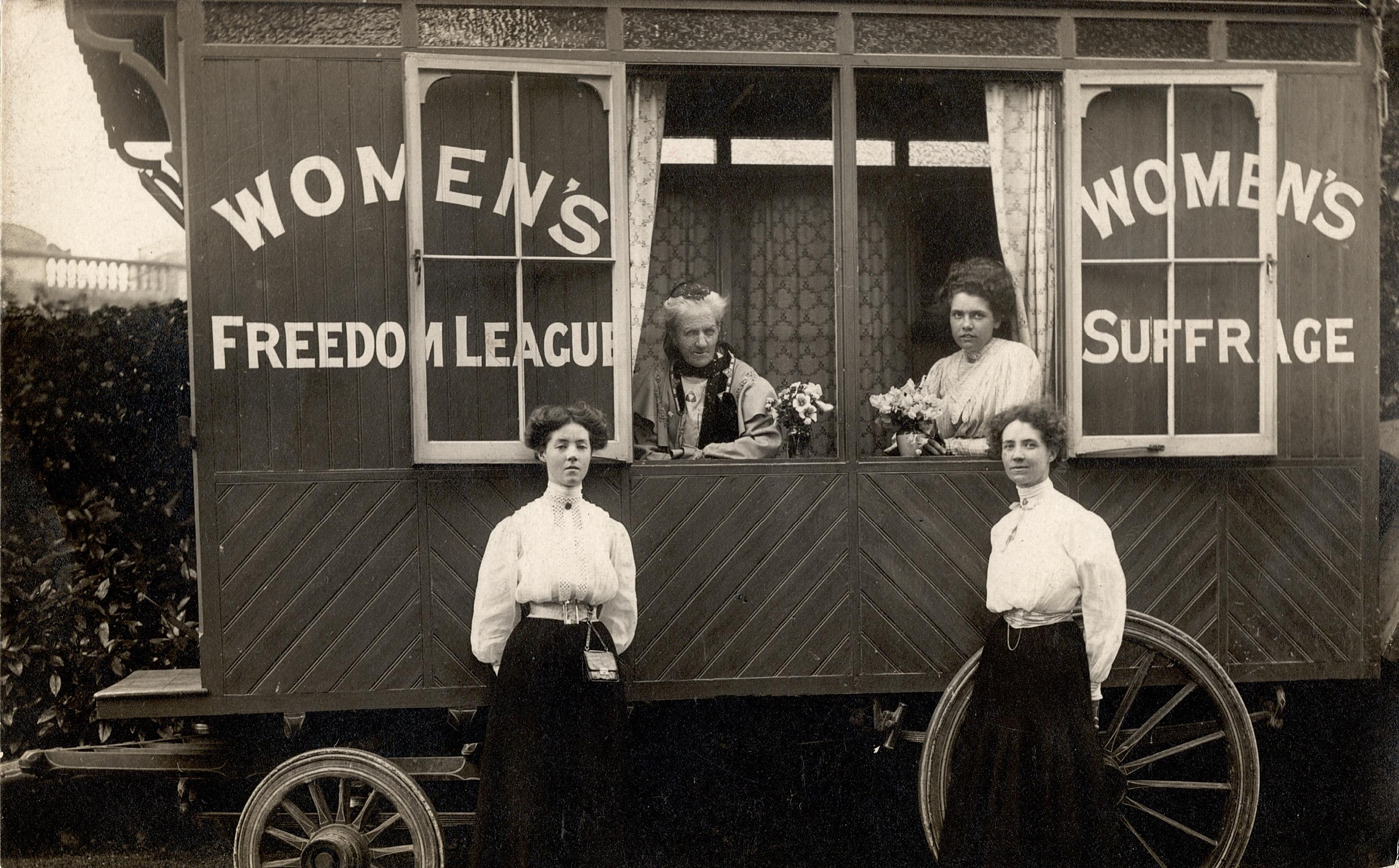
Women's Freedom League caravan with Charlotte Despard (left) and Alison Neilans (right) seated inside

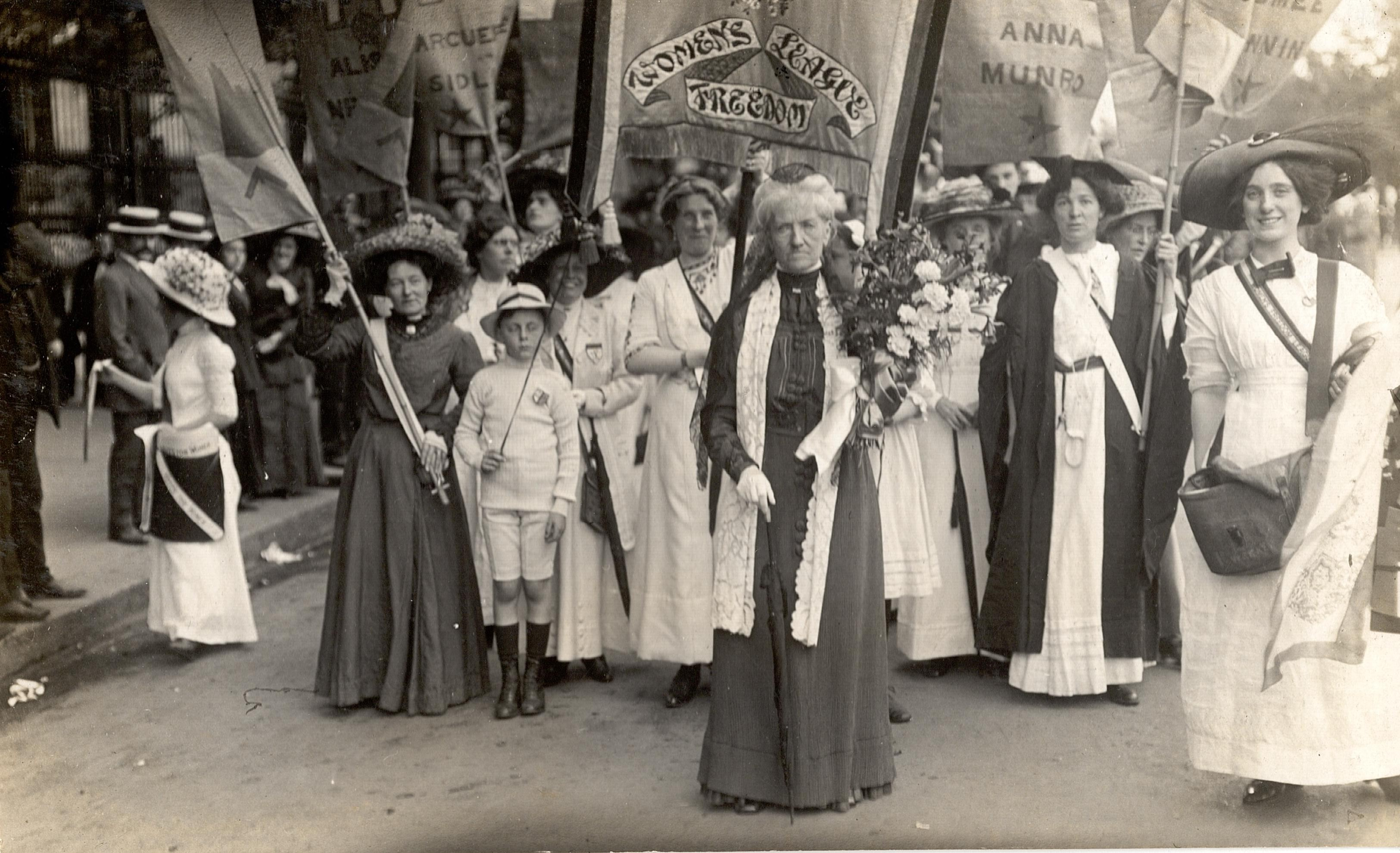
Women's Freedom League at Women's Coronation Procession, London, 17 June 1911. Charlotte Despard stands in front of a group holding banners.

== Post World War One ==
In the 1918 general election, held on 14 December 1918, as soon as possible after the Armistice, Despard, How-Martyn and Emily Frost Phipps stood unsuccessfully in London constituencies as independent women's rights anti-war candidates following the passing of the Parliament (Qualification of Women) Act 1918 in November 1918, which allowed women to be elected to Parliament for the first time. The WFL celebrated the achievement of partial female suffrage in 1918 and women's full suffrage in 1928 then refocussed the WFL's activities on equality, including equal pay and equality of morality. This included being an active member of the Equal Pay Campaign Committee (1941-1956). The WFL later supported member Helena Normanton in her bid to become one of the first two women barristers in Britain.

The group declined in membership but continued under the leadership of Marian Reeves to organise annual birthday parties for Despard and maintain the Minerva Club in Brunswick Square. After Reeves' died in 1961, the organisation voted to dissolve itself.

== Notable members ==
The following are just some of the many notable members of the Women's Freedom League:

- Charlotte Despard
- Edith How-Martyn
- Caroline Hodgson
- Alice Abadam
- Teresa Billington-Greig
- Marion Coates-Hansen
- Irene Miller
- Bessie Drysdale
- Maude Fitzherbert
- Muriel Matters
- Amy Sanderson
- Mary Molony
- Muriel Scott
- Eunice Murray
- Jessey Wade
- Annot Robinson
- Anna Munro
- Janet McCallum
- Sarah Benett
- Violet Tillard
- Gertrude Wilkinson
- Elizabeth Knight
- Harriet Christina Newcomb
- Alison Neilans
- Jessie M. Soga
- Lila Clunas
- Marjory Kennedy-Fraser
- Arabella Scott
- Maud Arncliffe-Sennett
- Ada Broughton
- Lillie Boileau
- Sylvia Murray
- Louisa Thomson-Price
- Christian Farquharson-Kennedy
- Florence Earengey
- Sime Seruya
- Agnes Brown
- Anne Corner
- Nina Boyle
- Alice Chapin
- Alice Schofield
- Stella Newsome
- Lilian Hicks
- Agnes Husband
- Octavia Lewin
- Mary Bell

== Commemorations ==
On 20 September 2023, English Heritage announced that the 1000th blue plaque in London would be placed at 1 Robert Street in Westminster, London. This was the site of the Women's Freedom League's headquarters for its "most active period" between 1908 and 1915.

== Archives ==
The archives of the Women's Freedom League are held in The Women's Library at the Library of the London School of Economics.

Some Women's Freedom League archives, including banners, minutes, pamphlets, photos, reports and The Vote, are available online through LSE Digital Library.

== See also ==
- Minerva Café, opened by the Women's Freedom league in 1916
- Women's suffrage in the United Kingdom
- List of suffragists and suffragettes
- Timeline of women's suffrage
- Women's suffrage organisations
- History of feminism
