= Lillie Boileau =

English political activist (1869–1930)

Lillie Mabel Boileau
- Born: 4 April 1869; British India
- Died: 15 August 1930 (aged 61); Highgate, London
- Occupation: Suffragette
- Organization(s): Union of Ethical Societies, Women's Freedom League
- Known for: Humanism, suffragism
- Criminal charges: Arrested in the course of presenting a suffrage petition to the prime minister, H. H. Asquith

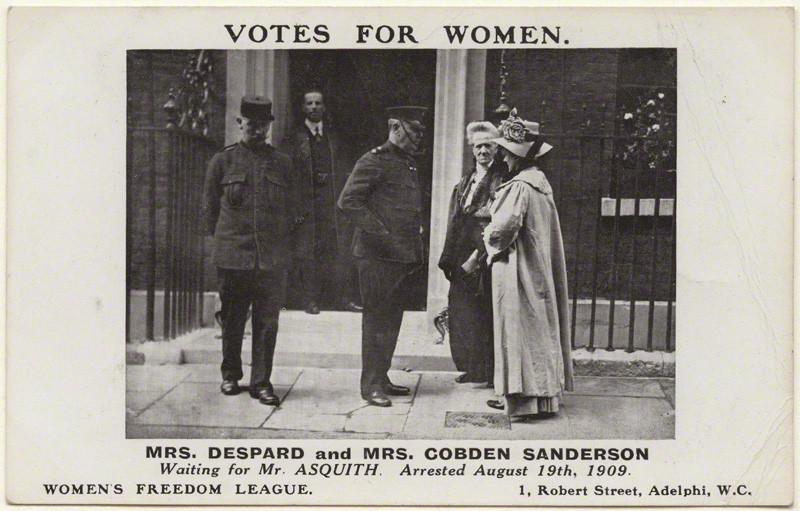
Charlotte Despard and Anne Cobden-Sanderson outside No. 10 Downing Street, shortly before their 1909 arrest alongside Lillie Boileau.

Lillie Mabel Boileau (4 April 1869 – 15 August 1930) was an English suffragist and active member of the Union of Ethical Societies (now Humanists UK). One of the earliest members of the Women's Freedom League, Boileau was one of five women arrested in 1909 attempting to present a petition to the Prime Minister, H. H. Asquith.

== Early life ==
Lillie Mabel Boileau was born in India to Major General Neil Edmonstone Boileau and Mary Catherine Elizabeth Flemyng. She moved to England as a child, where she remained for the rest of her life.

== Women's suffrage ==
In 1909, Boileau was arrested along outside 10 Downing Street with Charlotte Despard, Anne Cobden-Sanderson, and a number of others in the course of a 'picketing campaign for the Women's Freedom League'. Boileau was reported to have thrown a cardboard roll at Prime Minister Asquith when he refused to accept a petition.

Boileau's name appears on the Roll of Honour of Suffragette Prisoners 1905–1914. She is also noted as among the arrested on a handbill from 1909.

Boileau was one of 156 women who signed up to sit on the British committee for the Women's International Congress at The Hague in 1915, however restrictions on travel introduced by Winston Churchill meant that only three were able to attend: Chrystal Macmillan, Kathleen Courtney, and Emmeline Pethick-Lawrence.

The Vote recorded that after votes for women were achieved,

Miss Boileau organised many meetings at her own house, where subjects were discussed dealing with Women Police, Factory Legislation, Housing, Women in India, etc.

== Ethical Movement ==
Lillie Boileau was actively involved in the humanist Ethical Movement for over three decades, and served on the council of the Union of Ethical Societies from 1906. In The Ethical Movement in Great Britain, Gustav Spiller wrote that in Lillie Boileau 'the Ethical Union found one of its most intelligent, loyal and sympathetic collaborators.'

== Death ==
Lillie Boileau died suddenly on 15 August 1930, "whilst engaged in tending the flowers in her old-world garden at Highgate." She was cremated at Golders Green Crematorium, with a service led by Harry Snell. In his address, Snell said:

Her life was useful and commendable; she was gentle, with a firm will; she had a strong mind which was not yet closed or narrow, and, above all, not vague nor undecided. She had administrative gifts of a high order, and a tried and practical wisdom. She was a great servant and a great lady.
