= Janet McCallum (suffragette) =

Scottish activist (1881–1946)

- in a prisoner outfit
- Born: 21 July 1881; Dunfermline, Scotland
- Died: 24 March 1946 (aged 64); Pretoria, South Africa
- Other name: Janet Richardson
- Occupation: Linen worker
- Known for: Suffragette and trade unionist
- Spouse: Harry Richardson (m. 1915)
- Children: George, John & Effie

Janet "Jenny or Jennie" McCallum or Janet Richardson (21 July 1881 – 24 March 1946) was a Scottish trade unionist and working-class suffragette in a movement which was predominantly made up of middle and upper-class activists. As a member of the Women's Freedom League, she organised events in Scotland and took part in demonstrations in London. She was arrested after a protest in the House of Commons and spent time in Holloway Prison. She later became a full-time organiser of the Scottish Textile Workers Union. In 1919, she initiated a women-led rent strike by Rosyth tenants.

== Early life ==
Janet McCallum was born at Hospital Hill in Dunfermline in 1881. She was the eldest of the thirteen children of Janet McCallum (1860-1933) and John McCallum (1857-c. 1905), a stonemason. Her father worked on the construction of the Forth Bridge. She spent her early childhood in the town of Inverkeithing, and was probably educated at St. Leonard's School in Dunfermline. She worked in a linen weaving factory, Mathewson's, as a winder until 1908. She was unusual in becoming a working-class woman who was active in the women's suffrage movement.

== Activism ==
=== Trade unionism ===
As a young woman, McCallum was involved with trade union activities. In 1907 she organised what was called a "Great Demonstration" where the national leaders of the Women's Social and Political Union (WSPU), including Christabel Pankhurst and other national leaders, came to West Fife.

In October of that year she attended a conference on sweated labour in Glasgow, which would have been of interest to her given her work in a factory. Jenny organised and chaired open air meetings, often alongside Anna Munro of the Women's Freedom League (WFL).

=== Suffrage activism ===
By 1908, McCallum and her sister had joined in the Women's Freedom League. The League was a breakaway group from the WSPU who objected to the autocratic management of the Pankhursts. In the summer of 1908, McCallum was involved with influencing by-elections in Liberal party strongholds, a tactic frequently used by women's suffrage activists at this time.

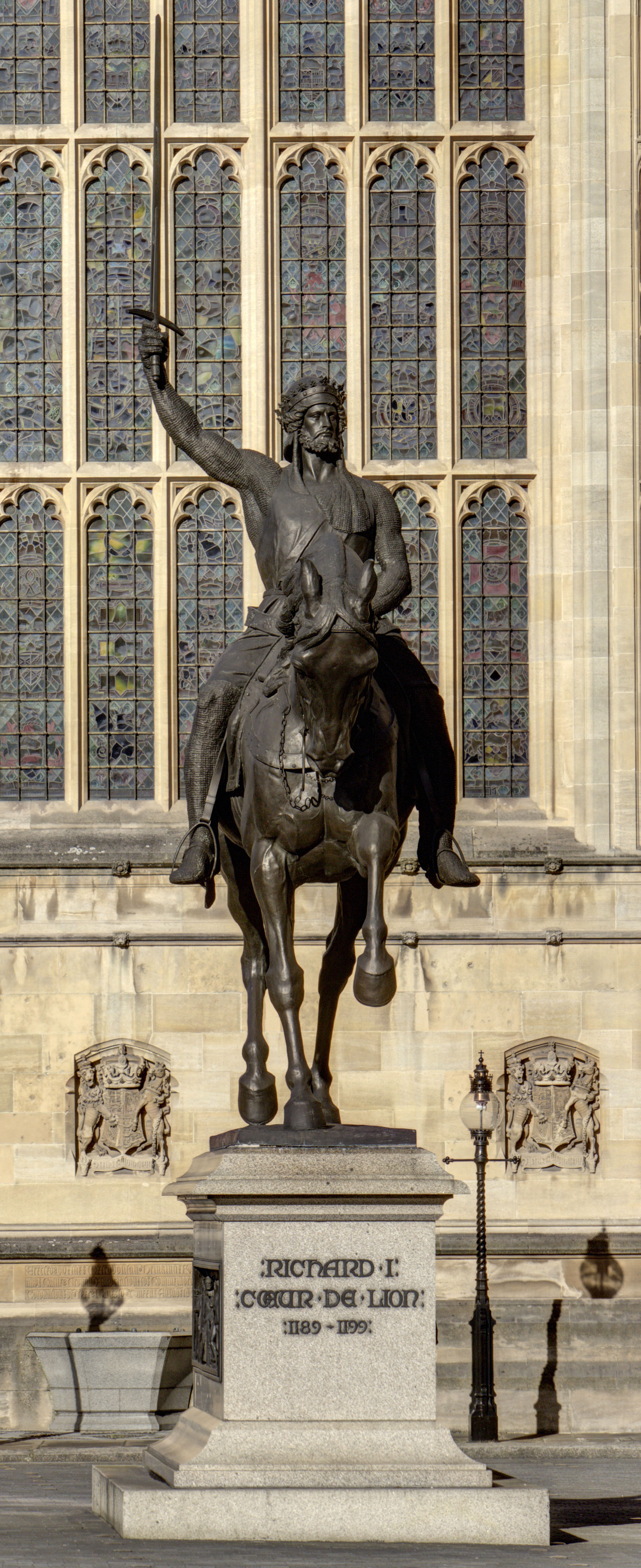
The Statue of Richard I in Westminster that she climbed on

On 27 October 1908 she was in London, taking part in a coordinated event, organised by the Women's Freedom League. According to a news report, there were a number of actions taking place at the same time. One group of women "and a couple of men" were inside the Ladies Gallery of the House of Commons, and began to shout, "Mr Speaker, members of the Liberal Government, we have listened behind the grille long enough. The women of England demand the vote." At the same time, a placard was being pushed through the grille in the ladies gallery, which stated, "Women's Freedom League demand votes for women". There was also a group outside, taking part in a demonstration in Old Palace Yard outside the Houses of Parliament; a newspaper reported that "four very athletic suffragettes clambered on a statue", that of the Richard Coeur de Lion .

When McCallum was arrested, a policeman said to her "Go away, you're Scotch". Reports of her trial described her as "a little Scotch girl with a decided accent" and treated her as a figure of fun. She was given the choice of paying a £5 fine or serving a sentence and chose a one month sentence.

She spent five days in Holloway Prison before being released on grounds of ill health. After leaving prison she went to Glasgow on behalf of the WFL, spending some time at their headquarters in the city. McCallum was awarded a Women's Freedom League medal, depicting the gates of Holloway Prison on the front and engraved on the back with her name and 28 October 1908 (the date of her imprisonment) and "For Womens Freedom". It is considered one of the first suffragette medals issued by the WFL.

On 18 June 1910, she took part in a Grand Procession in London, one of the earliest mass marches organised by the suffrage movement. She was among a group of "prisoners" - people who had been sent to prison for the cause. Other groups were graduates, teachers, athletes, musicians and actresses. Many of the groups carried banners.

As a wage-earner, McCallum's income was important to her family. When she returned to her home in Dunfermline, she was blacklisted by her employer, and it took her a year to secure another job in a mill. She resumed her trade union activities, and became the full-time organiser of the Scottish Textile Workers Union.

=== Rent strikes ===
In 1919 McCallum came to the fore in a dispute with the Scottish National Housing Company, of whom she was a tenant. She gathered attention for the Rosyth tenants who were involved in what was presented as a women-led rent strike. She organised a series of mass meetings, marches and pickets. The dispute led to some tenants appearing in court and McCallum was able to arrange for Sylvia Pankhurst to speak on their behalf.

== Personal life ==
After her spell in Glasgow, McCallum returned to Dunfermline and resumed working so that she could help support her mother and sister. On 17 December 1915, she married Harry Richardson, an engine fitter at Rosyth dockyard. They had three children.

In the 1920s Harry and Janet decided to emigrate as there was little work in Scotland. By the time equal suffrage for women was achieved in the Representation of the People Act 1928, she was living in South Africa. McCallum died in Pretoria in South Africa on 24 March 1946.

== Legacy and impact ==
In 2025, Fife Council announced that Janet McCallum High School was one of four shortlisted names for a new high school in Rosyth, put forward by a group of students from Inverkeithing High School which the new building will replace. McCallum's WLF medal was rediscovered in the possession of her descendants in South Africa as part of the research around the naming campaign.

In 2021 McCallum was included in an educational resource called Scotland's Suffrage Education Pack which was produced by crowdfunding and given to 100 Scottish schools to increase awareness of suffrage activism across the country. The educational resource also included a Top Trumps-style game called Scotland's Suffragettes Trumps, produced by Protests and Suffragettes (an organisation led by artists, activists and local historians). Women's History Scotland's Dr. Yvonne McFadden called the game 'a fun and important tool to make sure these women and their stories' are included in the Scottish school curriculum, as women's history is often limited in school history teaching.
