= Brunswick Square =

Public area in London, England

Coordinates: 51.5244°N 0.1218°W

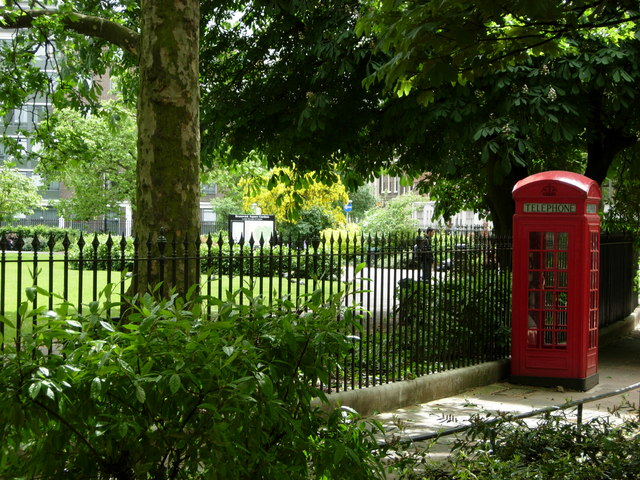
Brunswick Square, Bloomsbury

Brunswick Square is a 3-acre (1.2 ha) public garden and ancillary streets along two of its sides in the King's Cross area of the former parish and borough of St Pancras, in the London Borough of Camden. It is overlooked by the School of Pharmacy and the Foundling Museum to the north; the Brunswick Centre to the west; and International Hall (a hall of residence of the University of London) to the south.

East is an enclosed area of playgrounds with further trees, Coram's Fields, associated with charity Coram Family which is just over double its size; next to that area Brunswick Square is mirrored, symmetrically by Mecklenburgh Square, likewise of 3 acres including roads. The squares are named after contemporary Queen consorts (the wife of George III and the wife of his eldest son George IV).

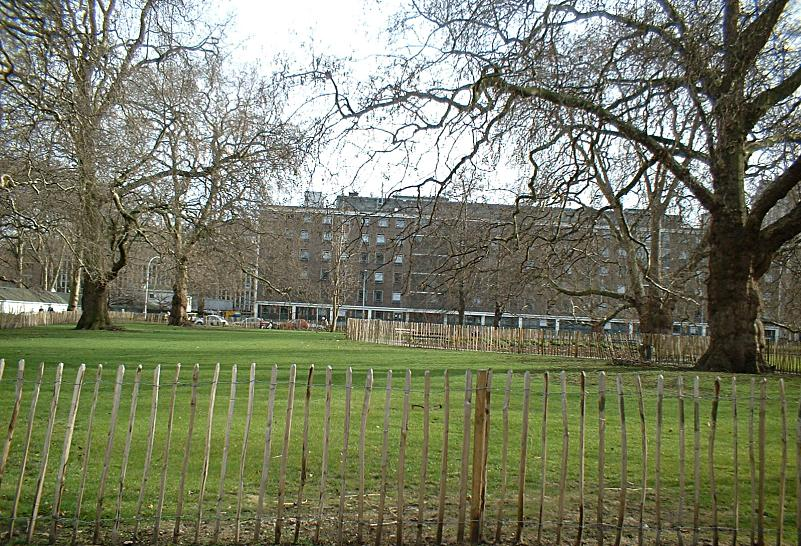
Brunswick Square

== Layout ==
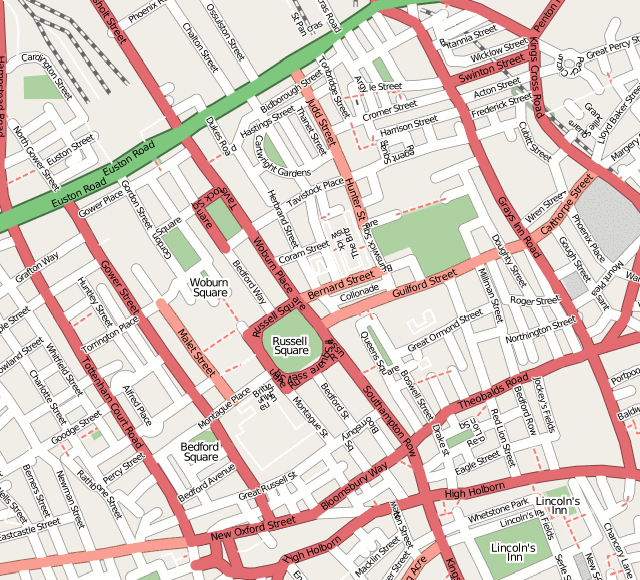
Map showing all of Bloomsbury and some adjoining areas. In the east a T-shaped green-shaded area has as its western projection Brunswick Square.

Bloomsbury is notable for its garden squares, literary connections, and numerous cultural, educational and health care institutions. Mecklenburgh Square is a matching square to the east covering three acres. Between the two, east of this square, is an enclosed area of playgrounds with further trees, Coram's Fields (associated with charity Coram Family) which occupies just over seven acres. Russell Square is the nearest tube station to the south-west.

Protection

Brunswick Square and Mecklenburgh Square and Coram's Fields are jointly listed Grade II on the Register of Historic Parks and Gardens.

== History ==
What is now the square (apart from the longer of the two roads bounding it and sharing in its name which is older) including the nearer part of buildings facing it was originally part of the grounds of the Foundling Hospital. It was planned to be leased for housebuilding, along with Mecklenburgh Square, to raise funds for the hospital in 1790. Brunswick Square, named after Caroline of Brunswick, was finished first, being built by James Burton in 1795–1802; none of the original houses remains.

The bronze sculpture of a child's mitten, by Tracey Emin, sits on top of one of the railings outside the Foundling Museum.

== In literature, arts and the media ==
In Jane Austen's Emma, John and Isabella Knightley live in Brunswick Square.

In William Makepeace Thackeray's Vanity Fair, Mr. Osborne lives in Brunswick Square.

== Notable residents ==
John Ruskin was born at 54 Hunter Street, Brunswick Square in 1819.

The Minerva Club was founded here by Dr Elizabeth Knight and Alice Green in 1920. The club was used for Women's Freedom League meetings and as a hostel for suffrage activists and fund-raising annual birthday parties for Charlotte Despard. Despard travelled from Ireland each year to attend.

The writer E. M. Forster used 26 Brunswick Square as his London base from 1930 to 1939.
