= Agnes Husband =

Scottish councillor and suffragette

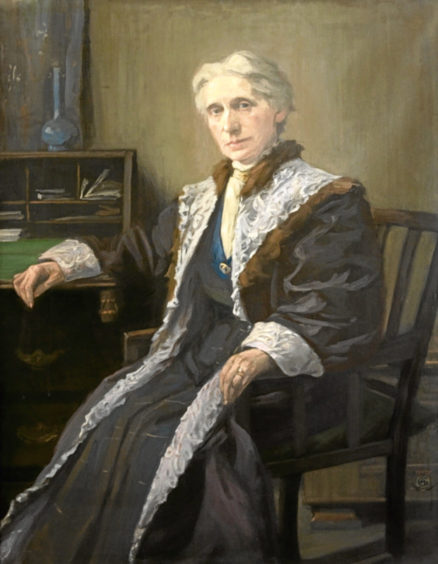
- Born: 20 November 1851; Tayport, Scotland
- Died: 30 April 1929 (aged 76)
- Known for: socialism and women's rights
- Awards: Freedom of the City of Dundee

Agnes Husband (20 November 1851 – 30 April 1929) was one of Dundee's first female councillors and was a suffragette. She was awarded Freedom of the City at the age of 74 and has a plaque to her memory in the Dundee City Chambers and a portrait by Alec Grieve is in the McManus Galleries and Museum.

== Early life ==
Agnes Husband was born in the Parish of Ferry Port on Craig or Tayport, the eldest daughter of a shipmaster John Husband and Agnes Lamond or Lomand. Agnes was born on 20 November 1851 and baptised on 20 May 1852. Husband and her sister later worked as dressmakers in the Murraygate, Dundee.

== Campaigning for socialism and women's suffrage ==
Agnes Husband became involved in her forties in socialism and the Labour party, standing unsuccessfully for election to the School Board in 1897. But in 1901 she was elected as one of the first two women on the Parochial Board. She attended over 80 meetings in a year serving on four committees. In 1905 Husband won a place on the School Board too and promoted providing meals, books, and nursery education to poor children in the city. Her own education continued in evening classes at Dundee University College and she became President of the Women's Freedom League (WFL) branch which started up in the city,

She promoted the humanising effect of women who have 'a keener insight, and a more humane ideal into the problem involved' if they only had the 'courage and conviction' also to put themselves forward to serve on key municipal boards. This was at a well attended 1911 ratepayers' meeting in Perth, and a motion by Perth Lord Provost Macnab was carried, to follow Dundee's example, based on what he called Husband's 'most suggestive and sparkling address' and he called upon support from what he dubbed 'the weaker sex, namely the men' - for that city also to encourage more women candidates to their School Board, Town Council and Parish Council elections.

In 1908, Husband introduced suffragette ex-prisoners Anna Munro and Amy Sanderson, whom she knew personally, to a large gathering in the Prince of Wales Halls, in Glasgow to share their prison experiences, when Sanderson said that prison reform was something that women should use their vote for, once it was won. In 1909 Husband had also taken on a national role in the movement for women's suffrage. Agnes Husband attended and was able to give a first hand report on the demonstration which took place at Westminster but this was not reported in the local press.

In 1910, Husband was one of the Scottish delegates to the WFL annual conference and pictured with eight others in The Vote, WFL's newsletter. In 1912, Husband attended the Seventh Annual Conference of the Women's Freedom League and is pictured greeting WFL President Mrs Despard. Activist Annot Wilkie or Robinson appears to have been influenced by Husband.

Despite a 'severe illness' in September 1913, after appearing alongside Charlotte Despard at an open air event in Hyde Park, London on 24 August 1913, Husband continued her activism. On 9 October 1913, she convened a meeting where Miss Deas expounded 'Bible reading and Votes for Women' showing that 'from the beginning of time fine women had claimed their rights and got them.' In the same month, under Husband's presidency, the Dundee WFL branch went out to join the local Women's Social and Political Union (WSPU) to demonstrate against forcible feeding of suffragettes at Dundee Prison. She was then re-elected as WFL branch president in May 1914, and membership had grown and held local events eliciting sympathetic support at dinner-hour and factory gate talks, including at Invergowrie Paper Mills, and outside the Old Grammar School by WFL Scottish organiser Ada Broughton and others.

Also in 1914, Husband was elected to the Dundee School Board, although fellow suffragist Mary H. J. Henderson was not successful, as the electorate for the organisation, included some plural voting arrangements (known as 'plumpers').

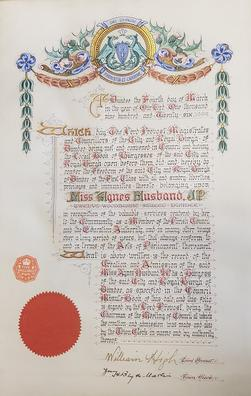
Agnes Husband Burgess Ticket awarded in 1926

In 1926 at the age of 74, she was the 5th woman to be given the Freedom of the City of Dundee.

Husband's Burgess ticket was on display in the City Archives for the centenary of women's suffrage, and it says it was "in recognition of the valuable services rendered by her to the Community as a Member of the Parish Council and the Education Authority and in many other ways over a long period of years".

She died in 1929.

Agnes Husband's influence and link to the wider suffrage movement was described as

"she worked long and conscientiously on behalf of the poor and for better education. As a member of the suffrage movement, she spoke, wrote and campaigned with gusto. She also supported and encouraged her younger sisters to become involved."

== Death and legacy ==
In her obituary Agnes Husband was described as 'a pioneer in asserting the claims of women and their competence to participate in the administration of public affairs' and as ' a pioneer in more humane treatment of the poor and in education and care of children.'

She has a blue plaque on the City Chambers, Dundee, and a portrait by Angus Grieve in the McManus Galleries and Museums.

In 2008, Husband was one of the twenty-five women included in the book 'Dundee Women's Trail: Twenty-five footsteps over four centuries'.

In March 2021, the Scottish Government Cabinet Secretary for Social Security Shirley-Anne Somerville announced that the head office of Social Security Scotland, in one of the controversial new buildings at the waterfront at Dundee will be named 'Agnes Husband House'. As the organisation is responsible for a range or social benefits, Ms Somerville said this is 'in-keeping with Agnes and everything she stood for'. The organisation's chief executive, David Wallace also said:

"Miss Husband dedicated so much of her life to helping the poor and oppressed, especially children...and her legacy lives on..those who work here will be proud to follow in her footsteps."

== See also ==
- Women's suffrage in the United Kingdom
