= Alice Schofield =

British suffragette and politician (1881–1975)

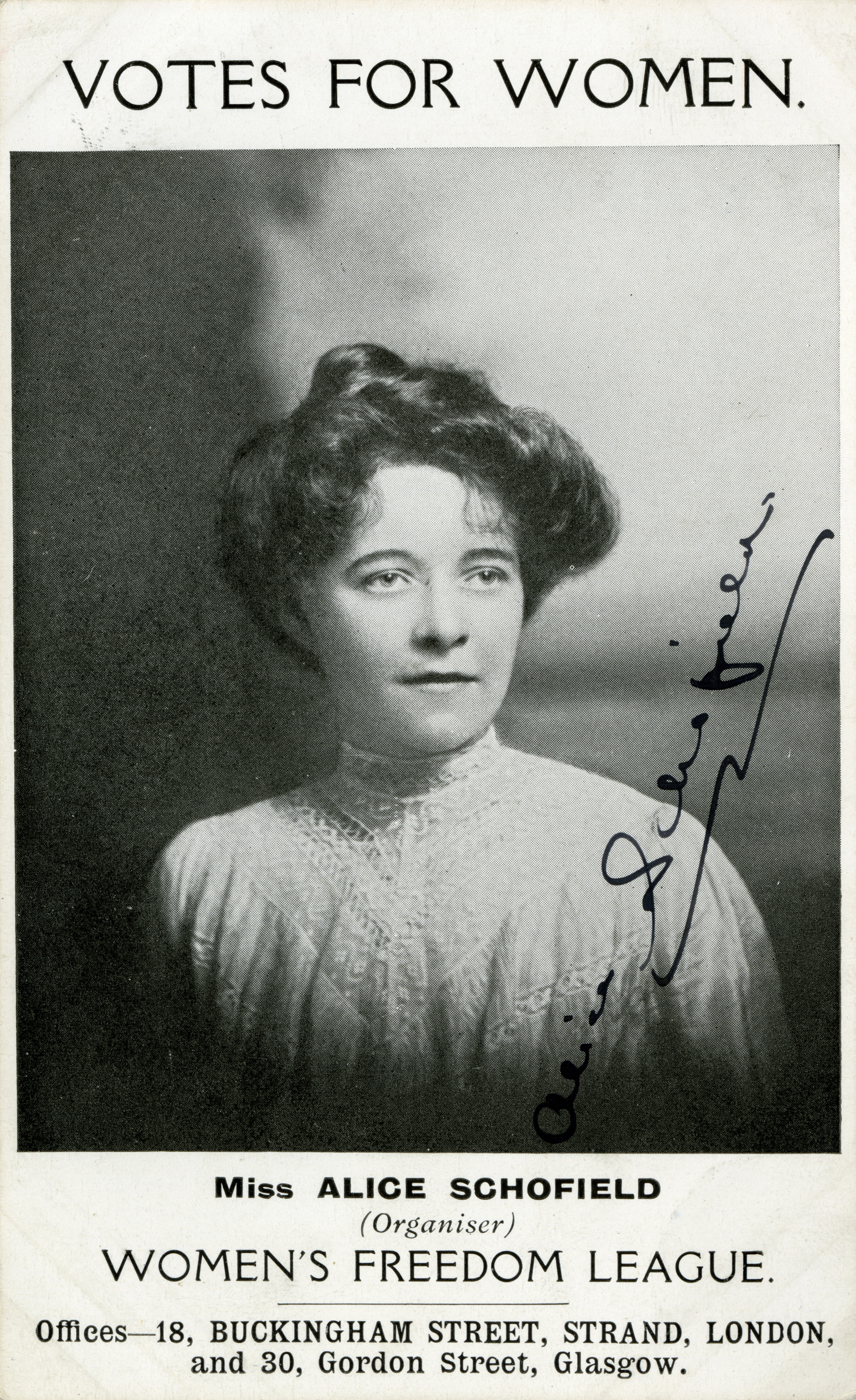
- Alice Schofield in 1907 by the Women's Freedom League
- Born: 3 May 1881; Cleveland, England
- Died: 19 June 1975 (aged 94); Middlesbrough, England
- Other name: Alice Schofield Coates
- Occupations: Teacher, activist and politician
- Known for: Women's rights

Alice Schofield or Alice Schofield Coates (3 May 1881 – 19 June 1975) was a British suffragette and politician. She campaigned for women to have the vote and later campaigned for the legislation to give women rights to equal pay.

== Life ==
Schofield was born in Cleveland, but her family was poor and she was brought up by an uncle and aunt in Manchester. She was not religious and she was a vegetarian. She trained as a teacher with Teresa Billington, who was also not religious. Schofield met Emmeline Pankhurst at a disciplinary hearing after Schofield refused to teach about religion. Other accounts say that she met Pankhurst at a speech. Pankhurst was a member of the Manchester Education committee and she arranged for Schofield to start work at a Jewish school where religious instruction was not legally required.

She and Billington joined the Independent Labour Party and both went to join Pankhurst's Women's Social and Political Union. She met Eva Gore-Booth and Esther Roper, and was enthusiastic about women's suffrage but not about the WSPU. Like many members she was alarmed by the autocratic manner of Emmeline and Christabel Pankhurst.

In 1907 the breakaway group of the Women's Freedom League was formed with more of a democratic approach. The new league included Charlotte Despard, Billington and Schofield. Schofield was employed as a full time official. The league was also militant, but it objected to the extreme measures encouraged by the Pankhurst's WSPU which included arson. Aged 28, in 1909, she was imprisoned for a month for obstructing the police.

In 1909 she was based in Middlesbrough where a brother of another WFL member came to her rescue during a physical attack. He was Charles Coates, 18 years her senior, and they married in February 1910. Coates had a good income from importing coal and they employed servants who taught and looked after their three children. When the 1911 census was taken, she took part of the suffrage boycott and resisted enumeration. Her husband filled in his information, but refused to record the female members of the household "until women are enfranchised".

Due to her financial security, Schofield able to travel on speaking tours to South Shields or into Scotland on WFL business. She also made frequent trips to London to attend WGL meetings where she was on the executive committee. She used the name Alice Schofield Coates. Coates and her husband operated a vegetarian restaurant on Linthorpe Road, Middlesbrough.

In 1919 Schofield stood as the first woman councillor in Middlesbrough. In 1924 her husband's business ceased to be profitable and he went bankrupt. Schofield continued to support the Labour Party and she became a Justice of the Peace.

At the end of her career she campaigned for women to have the right to equal pay. The legislation was passed in 1970. Schofield died in 1975.

== Oral history ==
Before she died in 1975 Schofield was very briefly interviewed by the historian Brian Harrison, in April 1975, as part of his series of suffrage interviews. Schofield talked about meeting Teresa Billington and joining the Women's Freedom League.

In April 1975 Harrison interviewed Marion Johnson, the daughter of Alice and Charles. She talks about her mother’s early life and employment as a teacher, and her work with the WFL. In March 1977 Harrison interviewed Alice Richards, the Coates-Schofield’s other daughter (their son, Peter, died in 1959). She talks about a typical day for her mother, and her friendship with Lilian Lenton, as well as her parents’ attendance at Labour Party meetings and evening entertaining. Both daughters mention their father’s bankruptcy and its impact. They also talk about their aunt, the suffragette, Marion Coates Hansen, who was Schofield-Coates sister-in-law, and mention that their mother and aunt did not get on and kept their distance from each other. In May 1977 Harrison interviewed (another) Alice Schofield, also a sister-in-law of Schofield-Coates. She also talks about Alice and Charles and their financial experiences, including the help her husband gave when Charles went bankrupt. All three interviews mention Alice briefly running a boarding house, from their home, Agecroft, which took in paying guests after her husband’s bankruptcy.
