= Louisa Thomson-Price =

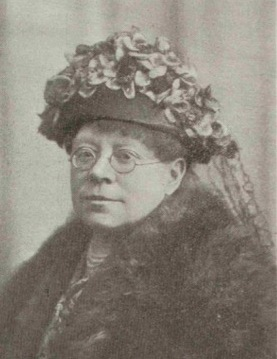
- from "The Vote" in 1926
- Born: Louisa Catherine Sowdon; 18 April 1864
- Died: 14 June 1926 (aged 62)
- Other name: Louisa Catherine Samson
- Known for: Cartoons and directing a company

Louisa Catherine Thomson-Price born Louisa Catherine Sowdon became Louisa Catherine Samson (1864–1926) was a British suffragist, cartoonist and businessperson. She drew cartoons for the Women's Freedom League and she was elected to be a director of the Slaters' Restaurant chain and the Smithfield and Argentine Meat Company.

== Life ==
Thomson-Price was born in 1864. Her parents were Captain William Henry Sowdon and Matilda Louisa (born Hutton) who had married each other on the island of Jersey. Her father was well-off, he was conservative and a Conservative and he served in the 2nd Life Guards. She had a brother and a sister. She was born with, and suffered from increasing, curvature of the spine. Her foul-mouthed father preferred alcohol and would sometimes not return home for a week.

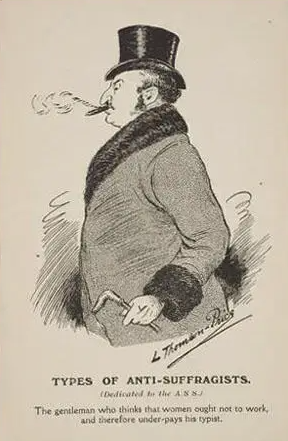
An "Anti-Suffragist Type" cartoon

In 1886, she showed her skills at drawing and writing when she published, Comic sketches and sober thoughts for the "merry and wise". In 1888 she was showing that she had not inherited her father's conservative views. She was a member of the National Secular Society and she married a member of the society's executive named John Sansom. Her new husband was the editor of the South American Journal.

In 1909, "The Vote" which was the magazine of the Women's Freedom League published its first cartoon - and it was by Thomson-Price who assisted with editing the magazine. She argued in "The Vote" against an anti-suffragist idea that equal rights would mean the end of chivalry. "True Chivalry" she said, would mean men taking women as equal partners and not as playthings or toys. created a dozen cartoons of Anti-Suffragist Types and they became a series and they were later sold as postcards. The Thomson-Price family sent out postcards in Xmas 1909 with the expectation that votes for women might come in 1910, but that was not to be.

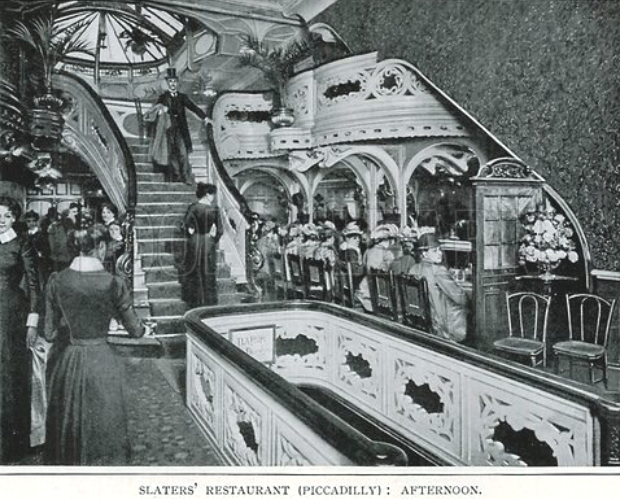
Slaters' Restaurant in Piccadilly in 1900

She became a successful businessperson. She was elected to the board of the company that ran the sixty Slaters' Restaurants. She became the deputy chairman and the restaurants that had a clientele of women was transformed. The style and fortunes of the company were improved creating a handsome profit by 1916.

She would attend share holders meetings. At one meeting in 1922 her enquiry as to why the Smithfield and Argentine Meat Company had not paid a dividend that year resulted in her leading a four month long enquiry. At the end of the enquiry she was asked to join the board of the company.

Her mobility became an increased problem but she was determined to deal with her business. She died on 14 June 1926.
