= Octavia Lewin =

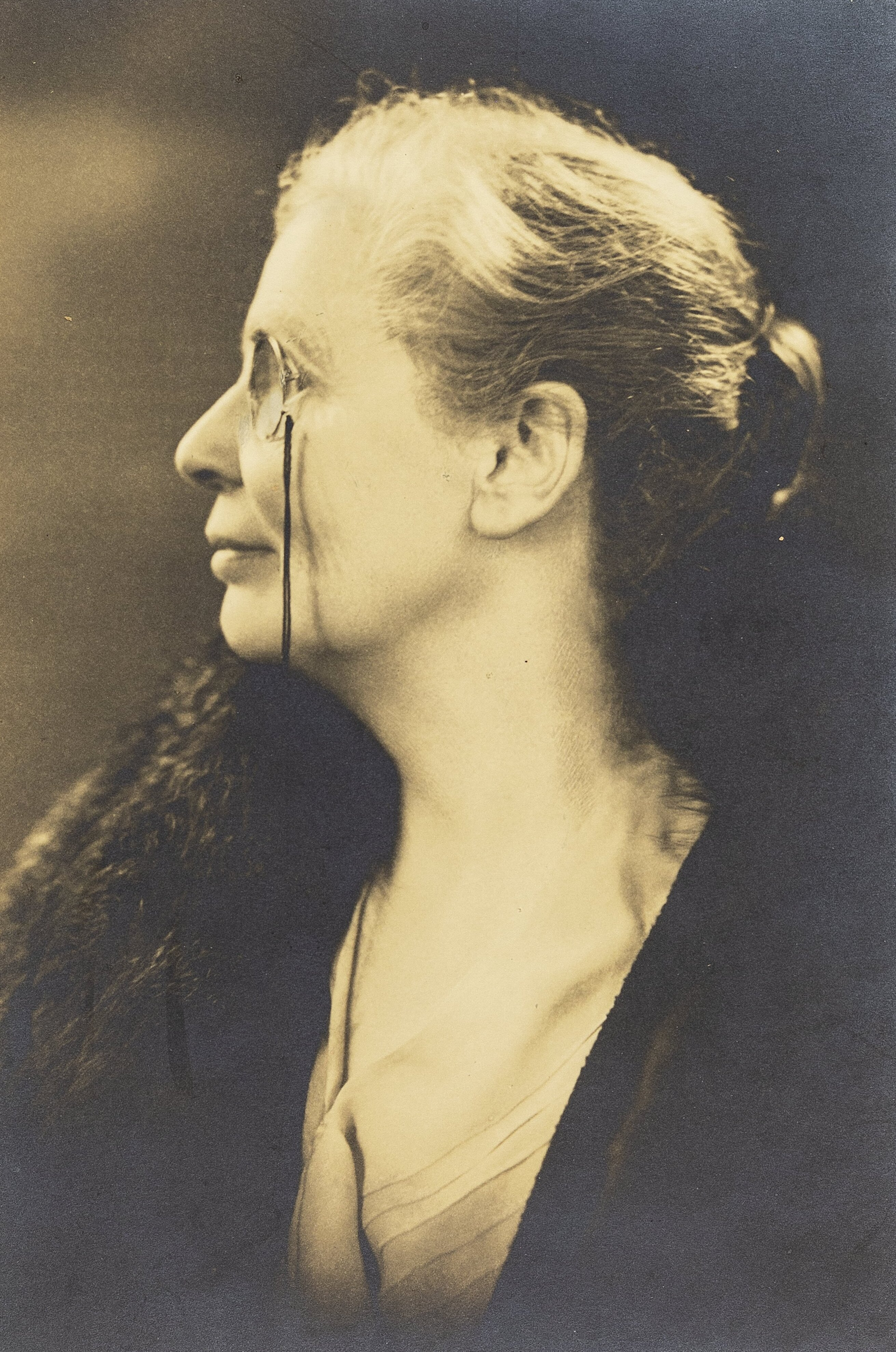
- wearing a monocle
- Born: Octavia Margaret Sophia Lewin; February, 1869; Hertfordshire
- Died: 27 December 1955
- Education: Girton College, Cambridge, London School of Medicine for Women
- Occupation: physician
- Known for: early woman doctor, leading suffragist

Octavia Margaret Sophia Lewin (February, 1869 – 27 December 1955) was a British pioneer woman doctor, suffragist and treasurer of the Women's Freedom League.

== Life ==
Lewin was born in Hertfordshire in 1869 to Jessie Augusta (born Cantwell) and Spencer Robert Lewin. Her father was a lawyer. She had a governess and she attended Frances Holland School.

Lewin studied natural sciences at Girton College, Cambridge before she studied at the London School of Medicine for Women. Her qualification allowed to be employed at the Royal London Homeopathic Hospital as an assistant physician. She soon joined the British Homeopathic Society after qualifying.

In 1903 she presented a paper at the British Homeopathic Society which created some controversy.

She became a suffragette in 1906 when she joined the Women's Social and Political Union which was dominated by Emmeline and Christabel Pankhurst. In the following year she left to join the more democratic but still militant Women's Freedom League. She joined in with the civil disobedience of refusing to take part in the census in 1911. She argued that if there was no vote then she did not need to co-operate in the census.

During the first world war she went to France with the Women's Hospital Corps where she worked as a surgeon on hearing issues. She then moved to work at the Endell Street Military Hospital in London. The hospital was new and run by ex-suffragettes with the suffragette motto of "deeds not words". As the war ended the Spanish flu killed many of the hospital's young staff.

Lewin survived and all women won the right to vote in 1928. In 1948 she had a practice in Manchester Square in London. This was the year that her alma mater, Girton College, was entrusted to give Cambridge degrees to women. Lewin died in 1955.

== Legacy ==
A portrait of Lewin is in London's National Portrait Gallery.
