= Annot Robinson =

Scottish suffragist and pacifist (1874–1925)

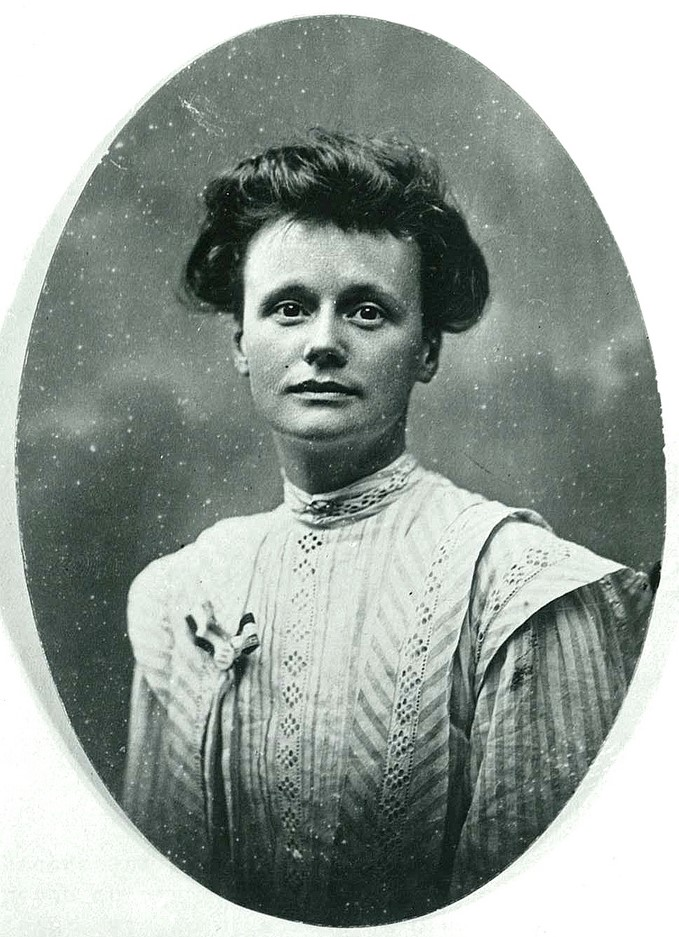
- Born: Annot Erskine Wilkie; 8 June 1874; Montrose, Scotland
- Died: 29 September 1925 (aged 51); Perth, Scotland
- Occupation: Teacher
- Known for: Suffragette and pacifist

Annot Robinson, nicknamed Annie, (née Wilkie; 8 June 1874 – 29 September 1925) was a Scottish suffragette and pacifist. She was sentenced to six months for trying to break in to the House of Commons. She helped to found the Women’s International League for Peace and Freedom.

== Early life ==
Born Annot Erskine Wilkie on 8 June 1874 in Montrose, Scotland, to John Wilkie (a draper) and Catherine Jane Erskine (a teacher). Wilkie was one of three daughters. Her sister, Helen Wilkie, later became Secretary of the Dundee branch of the Women’s Freedom League. Helen was a "gifted orator" who organised women for a Women’s Social and Political Union (WSPU) march in Edinburgh in 1907 and was part of the deputation who met with Winston Churchill in 1909.

Wilkie was a pupil teacher at Montrose Academy until she was 16. She then went on to teacher training college, before taking external classes in English, French, Astronomy, Comparative Religion and History at the University of St Andrews, where she was awarded the LLA in 1901.

== Campaigning for women's suffrage ==
Wilkie worked as a teacher in Dundee and it was while she was working here that she was influenced by Agnes Husband (a member of the Dundee Labour Party.)

In 1906 she became the first secretary of the Dundee branch of the Women’s Social and Political Union. In 1907 she moved to Manchester and became an organizer for the Women’s Social and Political Union, as well as joining the local branch of the Independent Labour Party, which she had become a member of the year before. In 1908 she and other members of the Women’s Social and Political Union tried to break into the House of Commons after arriving hidden in a furniture van, for which she was sentenced to six months in prison. In 1910 she became an organizer for the Women's Labour League and offered a conference resolution condemning the leadership of the Labour Party for failing to support the Women’s Labour League and women's suffrage. She later became an organizer for the National Union of Women’s Suffrage Societies, but during the war she resigned from that, helped found the Women’s International League for Peace and Freedom, organized Women's Peace Crusades throughout the nation, and worked for equal pay for female munitions factory workers. After the war she worked as a Women’s International League for Peace and Freedom organizer until 1922, and as such traveled to America, Britain, and Holland.

== Death ==
She died in Perth Royal Infirmary during an operation, and Ellen Wilkinson wrote her obituary. Wilkinson described her as "a big woman and a big personality" with "an exquisite sense of the ridiculous and a sharp tongue." Robinson's daughter, Helen, was interviewed about her mother in September 1981 as part of Brian Harrison's Suffrage Interviews project, titled Oral evidence on the suffragette and suffragist movements: the Brian Harrison interviews. Robinson talks about the relationship between her mother and father, Sam Robinson, and a little about their other daughter, Helen's sister Cathy, as well as suffrage meetings that she attended with her mother.

== Posthumous recognition ==
Her name and picture (and those of 58 other women's suffrage supporters) are on the plinth of the statue of Millicent Fawcett in Parliament Square, London, unveiled in 2018.
