= Elizabeth Knight (physician) =

English doctor and campaigner for women's suffrage

- Born: 31 August 1869
- Died: 29 October 1933 (aged 64); Brighton, England
- Education: Newnham College, University of Cambridge
- Occupations: Physician and benefactor

Elizabeth Knight (31 August 1869 – 29 October 1933) was a British physician and campaigner for women's suffrage. She was treasurer and a financial supporter of the Women's Freedom League which was a non-violent and anti-war suffrage group.

== Life ==
Knight was born in 1869. Her father left her a substantial inheritance.

After studying at Newnham College, Cambridge and then training at the London School of Medicine for Women she became a general practitioner from 1904. She joined the British Medical Association in 1907. A member of the Women's Freedom League, she was imprisoned in 1908 after attempting to interview Prime Minister H. H. Asquith at 10 Downing Street. There she wrote “Social and Sanitary Conditions of Prison Life”. She served further prison sentences for her part in the Women's Tax Resistance League.

Knight was a source of funds for the Women's Freedom League, including its newspaper, The Vote. She took over as treasurer from Constance Tite in 1912 where she brought more calm to the financial situation. Before she was appointed the league had suffered from occasions when it had to appeal to its members for loans. Knight devoted a lot of her time and introduced new fundraising schemes for the league although finances were also helped by large donations by an "anonymous" person. It is suspected that this person was Knight. Knight was one of the leaseholders of their premises in Holborn together with Charlotte Despard, Octavia Lewin and Alice and Edward Green. Within the building was the Minerva Cafe. This cafe should not be confused with the Minerva Club which was at 28a Brunswick Square and was paid for by Alice Green and Knight. The club was used for meetings but also acted as a hostel for suffrage activists from 1920.

Knight died in 1933 following a car accident in Brighton.
