= Anna Munro =

British suffragist (1881–1962)

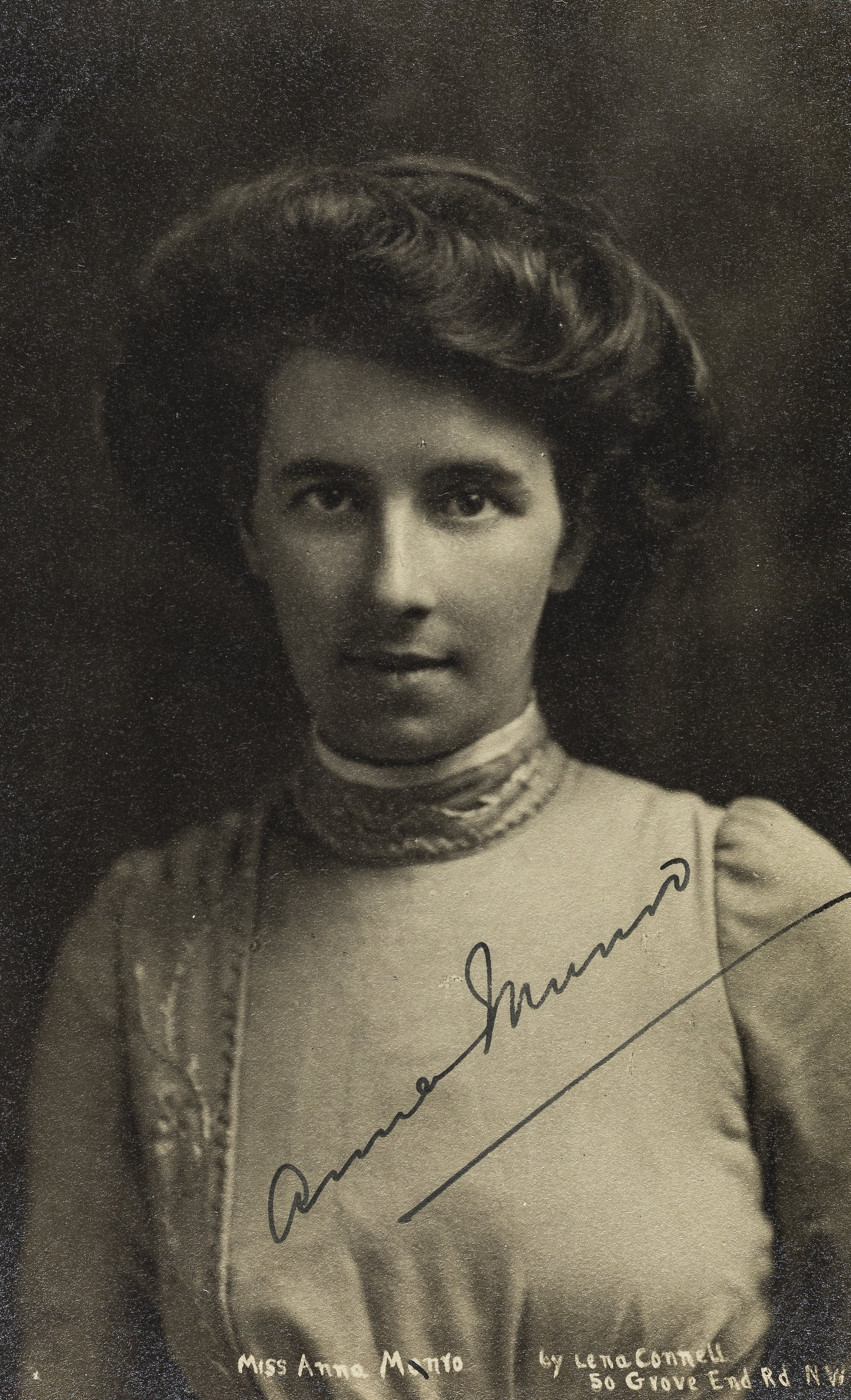
- suffragette
- Born: Anna Gillies Macdonald Munro; 4 October 1881; Glasgow, Scotland, United Kingdom of Great Britain and Ireland
- Died: 11 September 1962 (aged 80); Padworth, England, United Kingdom
- Other name: Anna Munro-Ashman
- Occupation: Campaigner
- Employer: Women's Freedom League
- Known for: Campaigner for women's suffrage and temperance

Anna Gillies Macdonald Munro (4 October 1881 – 11 September 1962) was an active campaigner for temperance and the women's suffrage movement in the United Kingdom. Munro organised and was the secretary of the Women's Freedom League campaigning in Scotland. She settled in Thatcham after the First World War but was living in Aldermaston by 1933 and died in Padworth, Berkshire in 1962. She had affordable housing named after her in Thatcham.

== Life and work ==
Anna Gillies Macdonald Munro was born in Glasgow, on 4 October 1881, to Margaret Ann MacVean, and Evan Macdonald Munro, a school master; following her mother's death in 1892 she moved to Dunfermline where she was cared for by an uncle and aunt. She became involved with the Wesleyan Methodist Sisters of the People in London working with the poor. She then joined the Women's Social and Political Union and founded a branch in Dunfermline in 1906,. and won support from socialist leaders and Labour's Keir Hardie. In 1907 a row between the membership and the Pankhursts led to a split in the WSPU and as a result the more democratic Women's Freedom League was formed and Munro was elected to be the Secretary of the WFL Scottish Council. She was briefly imprisoned in 1908 for her protesting. She accompanied Amy Sanderson, WLF executive committee member and fellow prisoner, on a speaking tour around the country, raising awareness and funds for the militant movement, and with hunger strikers Alice Paul and Edith New at Arbroath. in 1911, she was pictured in The Vote with the Scottish delegates to WFL Conference with Agnes Husband and six others. Later Munro participated in the protests around the 1911 Census which the suffragettes boycotted. Also in 1911, Munro was involved in a demonstration regarding the Conciliation Bill, speaking from a lorry in Princes Street along with Elizabeth Finlayson Gauld and Alexia B Jack. A newspaper report noted that the lorry was decorated in Women's Freedom League colours.

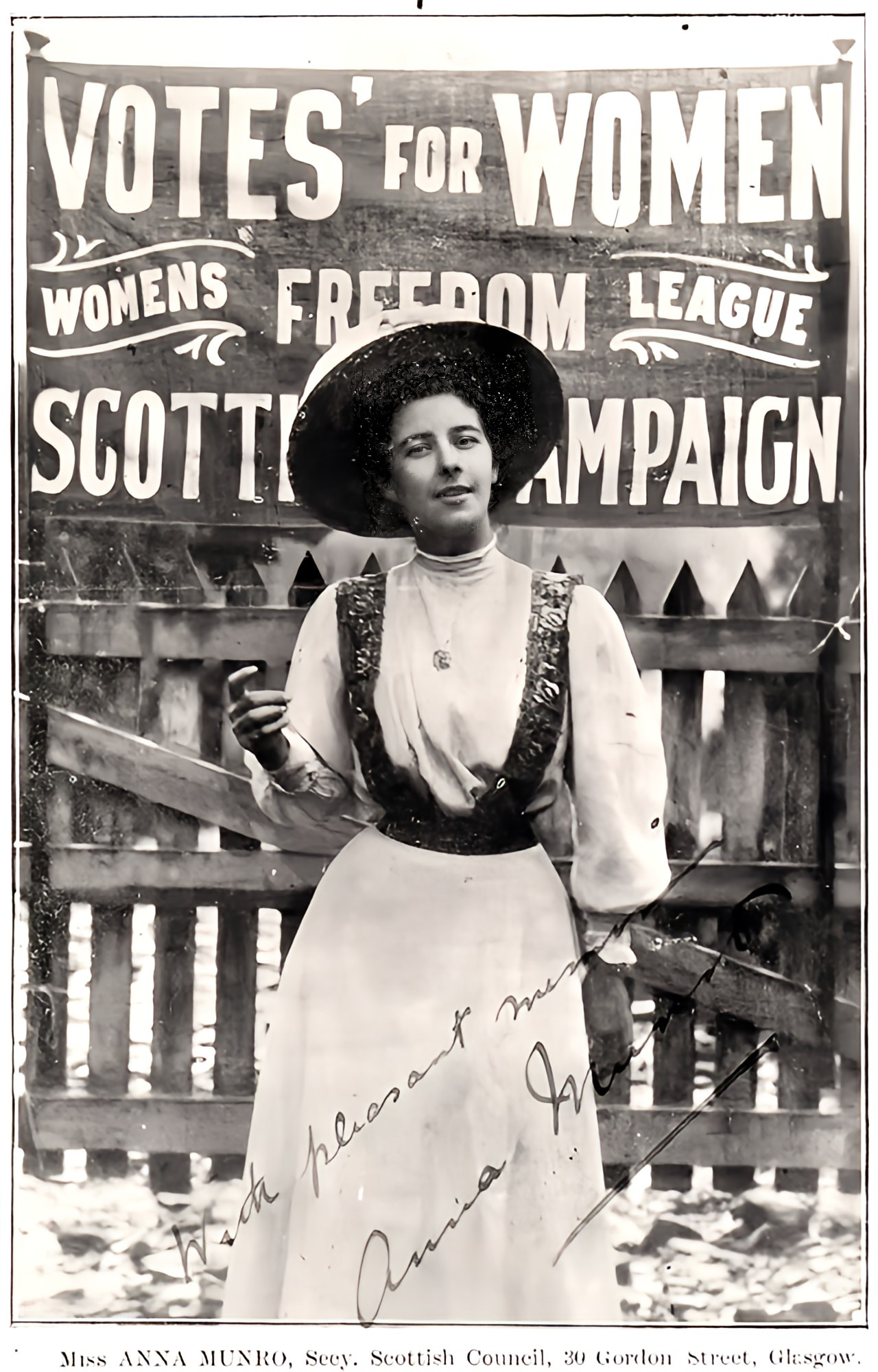
Scottish secretary

She married Sidney Ashman in 1913, and though she legally took the surname Munro-Ashman she was still known as Anna Munro in her work, and she continued to be active working for women's rights throughout her life. She was also a socialist and temperance campaigner. The Munro-Ashmans' lived in Reading, but then moved to Thatcham where Anna was one of the first parish councillors in 1919 and they raised their children, Donald and Margaret, at Park Farm. By 1933 she was living at Venturefair, Aldermaston where she hosted the Reading branch of WFL's celebration of founder Charlotte Despard 's 89th birthday in the garden, and presided. Despard spoke vividly on progress and steps needed to gain equality, calling Munro 'her dear and trusted friend'.

== Death and legacy ==
On 11 September 1962, she died in Padworth, Berkshire. New affordable homes in Thatcham are to be named Munro because she was one of the first two women Parish councillors in Thatcham. In 2018 the Glasgow Women's Library commissioned Lucia Hearn to create a short film about Anna Munro to celebrate 100 years since some women got the vote.

In 2022 her first memorial in Scotland was a street named Anna Munro Avenue. This is in Dunfermline, postcode KY12 9GL.

Brian Harrison recorded 4 oral history interviews about Munro as part of the Suffrage Interviews project, titled Oral evidence on the suffragette and suffragist movements: the Brian Harrison interviews. Jean Hunot, niece of Ella Woodall, a contact of Munro’s, was interviewed in January 1977. Donald Munro-Ashman, Anna’s son, was interviewed in July 1975. Her daughter, Margaret Ridgeway was interviewed in July 1977, and the family’s nanny, Dorothy Adams, was interviewed in August 1977.

== See also ==
- List of suffragists and suffragettes
- Women's suffrage in the United Kingdom

== External resources ==
- Anna Munro (GWL) 22 March 2019, animated film https://womenslibrary.org.uk/2019/03/22/anna-munro/
- Blog about her life, activism and speeches https://www.onfife.com/blog/break-the-bias-anna-munro-a-campaigner-for-womens-suffrage/
