= Froud =

Froud is the surname of the following people:

- Brian Froud (born 1947), English fantasy illustrator
- Brian Froud (actor), Canadian actor, voice actor and voice director
- Ethel Froud (1880–1941), British trade unionist and feminist
- Gordon Froud (born 1963), South African artist and curator
- Harry Froud (1898–1951), Australian rules footballer
- Susan Froud (born 1970), Canadian curler
- Wendy Froud, American sculptor and puppet-maker
