= Theodora Bonwick =

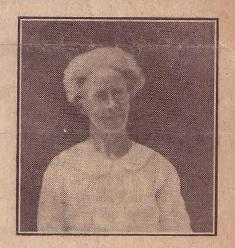
- Born: 27 December 1876; Shepherd's Bush, London, England, United Kingdom of Great Britain and Ireland
- Died: 10 November 1928 (aged 51); London, England, United Kingdom
- Education: Stockwell College of Education
- Occupation: Headteacher
- Known for: radical views on suffrage and sex education

Theodora Ellen Bonwick (27 December 1876 – 10 November 1928) was a British headteacher, trade unionist, educationist and suffragette. As a member of the Association for Moral and Social Hygiene, she became a strong advocate of sex education in schools, gaining the support of parents to establish sex education classes at Enfield Road School in Hackney while she was headmistress there.

== Life ==
Bonwick was born in Shepherd's Bush in London in 1876. Her family had returned from Australia, where Bonwick's three elder siblings were born. Her parents were Sarah (née Beddow) and William Priessnitz Bonwick. Her father was a teacher, and her mother was a suffragist who had been active in the Women's Liberal Federation. Her parents worked together for the Temperance movement and at a Sunday school.

Bonwick attended school in Maida Vale, and then trained as a teacher at Stockwell College of Education, where she obtained a BA degree. Reports recorded her ability for teaching and she received a teacher's certificate.

At the age of seventeen Bonwick gave her first speech on women’s suffrage. In 1905 she joined the militant Women's Social and Political Union (WSPU) and became a suffragette. When Women's Sunday was organised in 1908, with women marching to Hyde Park, it attracted 300,000 spectators. Bonwick was one of the speakers.

Bonwick became the secretary of the Hornsey branch of the WSPU. She tried to intercede in the dispute that had broken out in the suffragette leadership between Annie Kenney, Christabel Pankhurst and Sylvia Pankhurst. Emmeline was out of the country and Christabel was telling her younger sister that there was no room for dispute within the WSPU. Bonwick wrote a long letter to Christabel, and another to Sylvia, asking her to "lie low", as the public should not see more internal conflict in the WSPU. Sylvia was ejected from the WSPU for her socialist and democratic views and Bonwick became the president of the Women Teachers' Franchise Union (WTFU) in 1914. Thereafter, she sat on the Council of the National Union of Women Teachers (NUWT), and was still the president of its London branch when she died. She actively campaigned for women's rights in the London Teachers' Association, especially on equal pay.

She worked at Enfield Road School for Girls in Hackney and before 1914 she was the headteacher there. She obtained permission from the parents of the school to deliver sex education to her classes, a first for a school in London. When a 1914 enquiry considered this, however, it was rejected – because the teachers would find it difficult.

After the war she was headmistress of York Way Girls' School in King's Cross. She was radical in her leadership here, too, in following the Dalton Plan and opposing competitive sports. School inspectors noted that she was a good head, but they disagreed with her views.

== Death and legacy ==
Bonwick died of heart failure in London in 1928, the same year that all adults in Britain gained the right to vote with the Representation of The People (Equal Franchise) Act. Her funeral took place at Golders Green Crematorium. Afterwards, some of the flowers were given to Holloway Prison. The NUWT established a Memorial Fund in her name. The fund provided grants for London children for school journeys up until the 1950s. In 1990 Bonwick was chosen with three others, Agnes Dawson, Emily Phipps and Ethel Froud, to be featured in Hilda Kean's book, 'Deeds Not Words: The Lives of Suffragette Teachers'.
