= Hazel Hunkins Hallinan =

American women's rights activist and journalist

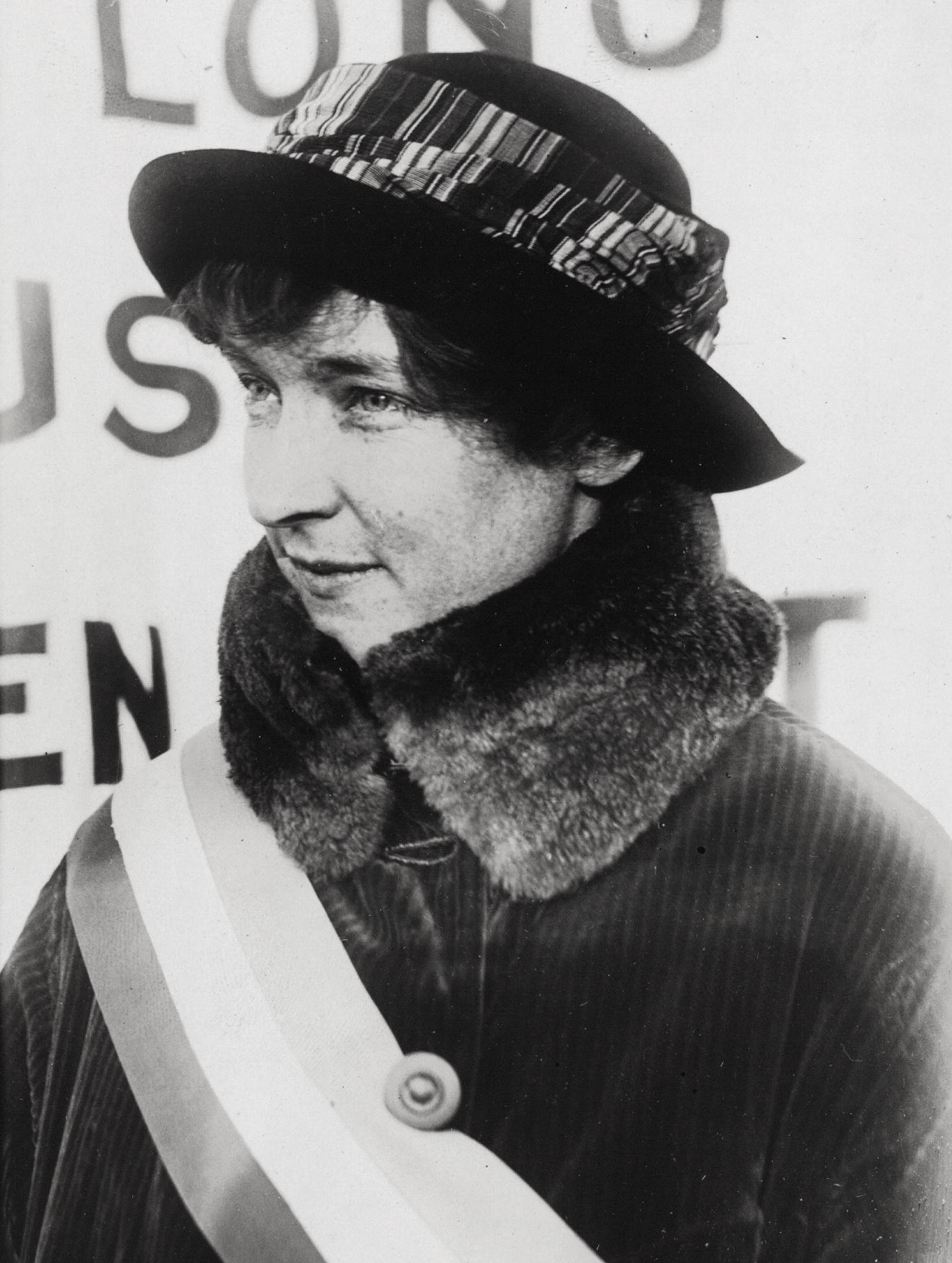
- Hunkins picketing c. 1917
- Born: Hazel Isabell Hunkins; June 6, 1890; Aspen, Colorado, U.S.
- Died: May 17, 1982 (aged 91); London, England
- Resting place: Mountview Cemetery, Billings, Montana, U.S.
- Education: Vassar College
- Occupations: Journalist, suffragist
- Spouse: Charles Thomas Hallinan
- Children: 4

Hazel Hunkins Hallinan (née Hunkins; June 6, 1890 – May 17, 1982) was an American women's rights activist, journalist, and suffragist.

== Early life and education ==
Hunkins Hallinan was born on June 6, 1890, in Aspen, Colorado, and grew up in Billings, Montana. She was the only daughter of Lewis Hunkins, a jeweller, watchmaker, and civil war veteran, and an Englishwoman, Ann Whittingham.

Hunkins earned a bachelor's degree in chemistry from Vassar College. She then lectured in chemistry to freshmen at the University of Missouri for three years, whilst beginning a master's degree in chemistry, but was denied promotion despite being better qualified than her male colleagues. Her career was impacted when she was expected to return home to nurse her critically ill mother. Hunkins applied for a chemistry teaching post at Billings high school but was told that only men would be considered for the post, although she accepted a botany and geography position.

She took up the suffragist cause after 200 chemical firms refused to hire her as an industrial chemist because she was a woman.

== Suffragist career ==
Hunkins met Anna Louise Rowe, of the National Woman's Party (NWP) in the summer of 1916, when the latter was in Billings to establish NWP branches across Montana on behalf of Alice Paul, the party's leader. Hunkins's began organising Billings's NWP branch, then become Montana's state chair of the National Woman's Party, travelling the state speaking at public meetings. When the Democratic Party blocked proposed equality legislation for women, NWP members concentrated their efforts on picketing the White House in Washington. Demonstrating with the Silent Sentinels Hunkins chained herself to the White House gates in 1917, for which she was subjected to physical violence and verbal abuse from crowds and police, then jailed, along with other suffragists.

Hunkins served several gaol sentences and took part in prison hunger strikes from 1917. She and other women suffrage protesters considered that they were being held as political prisoners by the US government, as they were American citizens but protesting being denied the vote.

== Move to Britain ==
Hunkins moved to Britain in July 1920 to conduct research for the American Railway Brotherhood on the British co-operative movement. She wrote the column ''London Letter'' for The Chicago Tribune. Her future husband Charles Hallinan crossed the Atlantic to follow her in November as the financial editor of United Press International. Hunkins and Hallinan lived together in London, but did not formally marry until the end of the decade. She never called herself "Mrs Charles Hallinan. I have always had my own name".

Hunkins Hallinan published a collection of essays, In Her Own Right. She also contributed to Speaker for Suffrage and Petitioner for Peace, a memoir by Mabel Vernon. Other contributors were Consuelo Reyes-Calderon, Fern S. Ingersoll, and Rebecca Hourwich Reyher.

To develop her knowledge of political and economic issues, Hunkins Hallinan attended lectures at the London School of Economics. She was a member of the 1917 Club and attended Fabian social events. She was society correspondent of the Chicago Tribune for fourteen years and became a sub-editor of the Statesman's Yearbook.

== Six Point Group and campaigning for women's rights ==
Hunkins Hallinan was an active and long term senior member of the Six Point Group (SPG), joining in 1922 and remaining involved until her death. SPG was a non-party political group formed in 1921 by Lady Rhondda with an early membership drawn from suffragettes and suffragists interested in practical action for social, economic, and political equality for women. Many of Hunkins Hallinan's friends, such as Crystal Eastman, Dora Russell, and Vera Brittain were leading feminists of the 1920s and 1930s.

She was the SPG's honorary secretary for years and in the 1950s became its chair, and took a prominent role in feminist campaigns of the time, including women's equal pay, promotion and employment rights for professional and married women balancing work and family responsibilities. She later said that 'My very modest distinction is that I am the only American woman who has achieved the chairmanship of a national organisation (British) without having climbed to that office through marriage to an English title!'

She was a member of the Married Women's Association, alongside Vera Brittain, Juanita Frances, Doreen Gorsky, Helena Normanton and Lady Helen Nutting. She was a member of the British all-party parliamentary equal rights group which laid the groundwork for anti-discrimination legislation in the 1970s. She was interested in birth control and abortion rights and worked with the Abortion Law Reform Association from the end of the 1960s.

In 1977, she returned to the US to join a commemoration of the 1917 march of 5,000 women along Pennsylvania Avenue to the White House, that led to her imprisonment, along with Alice Paul. Hunkins Hallinan joined the March for Equal Rights parade along Pennsylvania Avenue from the National Archives to the White House, which also commemorated the August 26, 1920, adoption of the Nineteenth Amendment to the United States Constitution which granted the right to vote to women.

In 1977, she stated, "Equal rights is so clear-cut; it's fundamental - a basic change. It really shouldn't be muddled up with anything else - no side issues. All the other little injustices can be taken on later. For half a cent I would stay here and campaign."

== Personal life ==
Soon after her last release from prison, Hunkins met her future husband, Charles Thomas Hallinan (d. 1971), at a pacifist meeting where he was a speaker. They married in the late 1920s and had four children, Nancy, Joyce, Timothy and Mark.

== Later life ==
Hunkins Hallinan died from respiratory failure at her home, 15B Belsize Park Gardens, Belsize Park, in north London on May 17, 1982, aged 91. She was buried at Mountainview Cemetery in her hometown of Billings, Montana, next to her husband and parents.

Hazel Hunkins Hallinan's papers, alongside those of the Six Point Group, are deposited at the Women's Library at LSE. The Women's Library collection also holds an oral history interview with Hunkins-Hallinan, recorded by Brian Harrison, in February 1975, as part of the Suffrage Interviews project, titled Oral evidence on the suffragette and suffragist movements: the Brian Harrison interviews. Hunkins Hallinan talks about the work of Teresa Billington-Greig, and discusses the formation of the Married Women's Association growing out of the Six Point Group, including the differences in opinion which prevented their amalgamation.

== Publications ==
- In Her Own Right
