= Juanita Frances =

Juanita Frances Lemont
- Born: 5 October 1901; Adelaide
- Died: 25 November 1992 (aged 91); Camden Town
- Known for: founded the Married Women's Association

Juanita Frances, née Juanita Frances Lemont, married name Juanita Frances Schlesinger (1901-1992) was a feminist activist and a founder of the Married Women's Association (MWA).

== Life ==
She was born in Australia. She never knew her father, Timothy Lemont, and she was brought up by her mother who was a shop assistant. Her father was in the navy. She trained as a nurse and moved to the UK in the 1920s. While she was helping women in North Kensington she met and was inspired by the veteran suffragette Flora Drummond who was nicknamed "The General".

She became involved with the feminist Six Point Group after her arrival in England. The group wanted to get women's equality included in the work of the League of Nations and the "Equal Rights International Group" was formed and Frances was sent to Geneva where she had three unproductive meetings. She wanted to empower mothers and married women.

She was instrumental in setting up the Married Women's Association in 1938, and later served as its president. The first President of the MWA was Edith Summerskill and other notable recruits were Vera Brittain, the lawyer Helena Normanton and later in 1945 Lady Helen Nutting.

In 1947 after they had two children she divorced her husband, a banker named Gerald Leonard Schlesinger. The London house which he had built became the MWA's official headquarters.

1952 was the big split. Helena Normington was President and she took an independent line when presenting evidence to the Royal Commission on Marriage and Divorce. Rank and file objections were made that the approach favoured privileged women which was not the association's aim. The row resulted in a schism and the formation of the Council of Married Women led by Normanton, Doreen Gorsky, Evelyn Hamilton and Helen Nutting. These had been the President, Chair, Deputy Chair and Secretary, respectively, before their resignations. The Royal Commission would take five years to consider its position, reporting in 1956.

Brian Harrison recorded an oral history interview with Frances, in November 1974, as part of the Suffrage Interviews project, titled Oral evidence on the suffragette and suffragist movements: the Brian Harrison interviews. Frances discussed her role in the Women's Guild of Empire, setting up the Married Women's Association, and a number of prominent figures within the women's movement, including Flora Drummond, Teresa Billington-Greig, Dorothy Evans and Monica Whately.
