= Timanus =

Timanus is a surname. Notable people with the surname include:

- E. Clay Timanus (1863–1923), mayor of Baltimore
- Eddie Timanus (born 1968), American sportswriter and game show contestant
- George Loutrell Timanus (1892–1981), American physician and abortionist
- Gustavus B. Timanus (1865–1941), former mayor of Laurel, Maryland
