= Muriel Pierotti =

English feminist and trade unionist

A. Muriel Pierotti
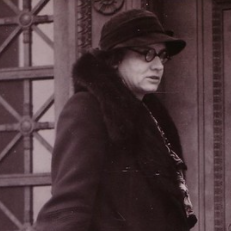
- Pierotti in 1938
- Born: 7 July 1897; Bristol, England
- Died: 25 October 1982 (aged 85); Oxfordshire, England
- Occupations: Suffragist, feminist, and trade unionist
- Employer: National Union of Women Teachers

Muriel Pierotti (7 July 1897 – 25 October 1982) was an English feminist and trade unionist. She was a leading figure in the National Union of Women Teachers (NUWT), for which she worked for more than 35 years.

== Early life ==
A. Muriel Pierotti was born in Bristol in 1897, and moved with her family to Clapton, London when she was ten years old. Her family were originally from Tuscany. Soon after moving to London, her mother joined the suffrage campaigning organisation the Women's Freedom League, involving her daughters from an early age. Muriel remained a member of the Women's Freedom League throughout the 1920s and was an active suffragist. Pierotti's father was a socialist, who worked in the postal service. He put the family home in his wife's name so that she was able to vote after 1918, when property-owning women over the age of 30 obtained the right to vote.

== Career ==
Pierotti was educated at Kingsland Secondary School, leaving at 18 to work in the Civil Service. She qualified as a secretary, working for a number of years at a hospital school run by Mrs Kate Hervey, a friend of Charlotte Despard. In 1925, Pierotti moved to the National Union of Women Teachers, becoming Assistant Secretary in 1931. Also in 1925, she authored a suffrage pamphlet titled What We Have and What We Want!

In September 1941, she took over from Ethel Froud as General Secretary of the NUWT, remaining in post until the organisation disbanded in 1961. A history of the NUWT, written by Pierotti, was published in 1963. Pierotti was a devoted trade unionist, and took an active role in the Equal Pay Campaign Committee of the 1940s and 1950s, acting as vice chair of the committee. Hers was the first signature on the 1954 petition requesting equal pay for men and women in the public services. During the 1940s, she was a member of the Joint Standing Committee of Women's Organisations, which considered questions relating to women's status, and from 1945 to 1978 was a leading figure in the Status of Women Committee.

Pierotti deposited her papers with the Women's Library. She died in Oxfordshire on 25 October 1982. The collection also contains an oral history interview with Pierotti, recorded by Brian Harrison in August 1974, as part of the Suffrage Interviews project, titled Oral evidence on the suffragette and suffragist movements: the Brian Harrison interviews. Pierotti talked about her mother’s suffragism, including her involvement with the Women’s Freedom League, and her friendships with Teresa Billington-Greig and Charlotte Despard. She also discussed her own involvement in the National Union of Women Teachers, and the London Children’s Care Committee.
