= Broadmoor Sirens =

Warning siren system in England

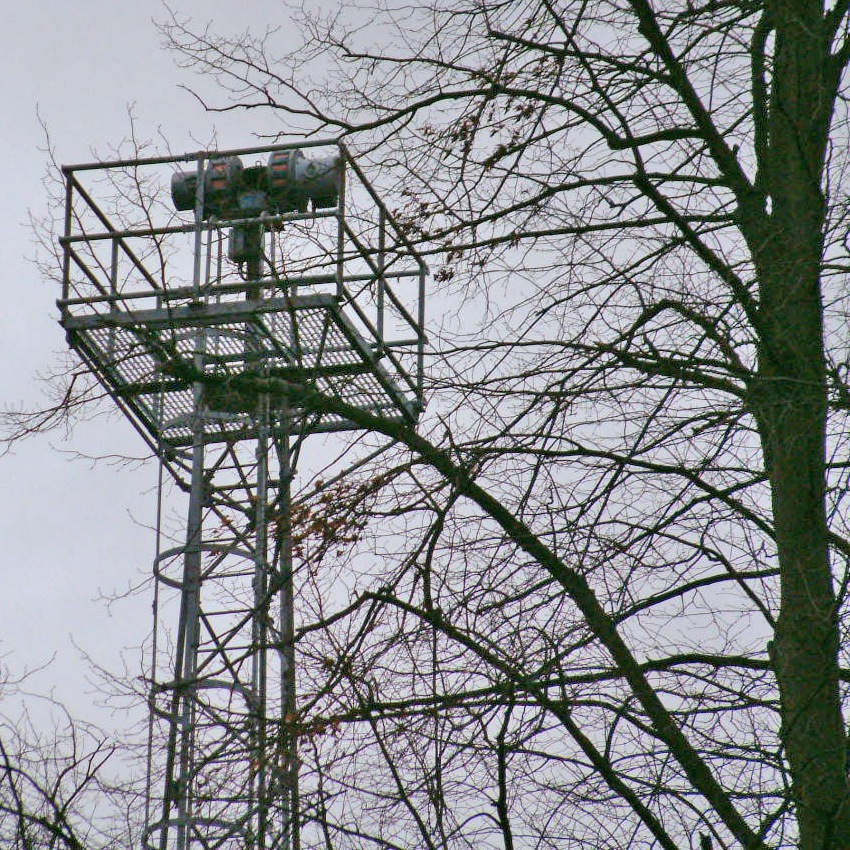
One of the Broadmoor Sirens

The Broadmoor Sirens were a series of thirteen warning sirens based in towns and villages surrounding Broadmoor Hospital in Crowthorne, Berkshire, England. They were first installed in 1952 and are based on air raid sirens with the intention of warning residents living near the high-security psychiatric hospital of an escaped patient, with special shutters fitted to allow for a Hi-Lo tone to differentiate them from air-raid sirens.

== History ==
The Broadmoor Sirens were installed in 1952 after John Straffen escaped from Broadmoor and murdered a child in Farley Hill, Berkshire. They are similar to air-raid sirens but employ shutters to produce an alternating "high – low" warning tone. More sirens were added in the 1960s after discussions in the House of Commons raised the issue that the sirens' two-mile (3.2 km) radius was insufficient for nearby towns such as Camberley and Wokingham.

The thirteen sirens were created with the intention of warning residents in surrounding towns and villages to remain in their homes and keep their children supervised following the escape of a Broadmoor patient. The sirens were activated as a test at 10 am every Monday. The sirens are susceptible to electrical interference. In 2014, the Bracknell siren was activated accidentally during an electrical storm. In 2019, the sirens were also accidentally activated due to a technical fault. The thirteen satellite sirens were due to be decommissioned during 2018, with one siren remaining in the hospital grounds.

The 1978 hit song "Sound of the Suburbs" by Camberley group the Members refers to the regular testing of the sirens.

== Future ==
The last time the Broadmoor Sirens were activated because of an escape was in 1991, although they were activated in 1993 because of an attack at the hospital. In 2014, there were plans to remove seven of the thirteen sirens. This was because Broadmoor had added a second security fence around the hospital and intended to upgrade the remainder of the sirens so they had a five-mile (8.0 km) radius to improve on the two-mile radius of the sirens, which were installed in the late 1950s and early 1960s. Local residents objected to this on safety grounds due to there being sixteen primary schools within the radius of the sirens.

It was reported on 2 June 2016 that Broadmoor planned to remove all except the hospital siren, with alerts issued instead via television and social media. The individual sirens were replaced by a single longer-range siren at the hospital.
