= Emily Phipps =

British lawyer, teacher, suffragette and editor

Emily Frost Phipps
- Emily as a barrister
- Born: 17 November 1865; Devonport, Devon, England
- Died: 3 May 1943 (aged 77); Newbury, Berkshire, England
- Education: Homerton College, Cambridge London University
- Occupations: Teacher and barrister
- Movement: Women's Freedom League, National Union of Women Teachers
- Parents: Henry John Phipps (father); Mary Ann Phipps (mother)

Emily Frost Phipps (7 November 1865 – 3 May 1943) was an English teacher and suffragette, a barrister in later life, and an influential figure in the National Union of Women Teachers.

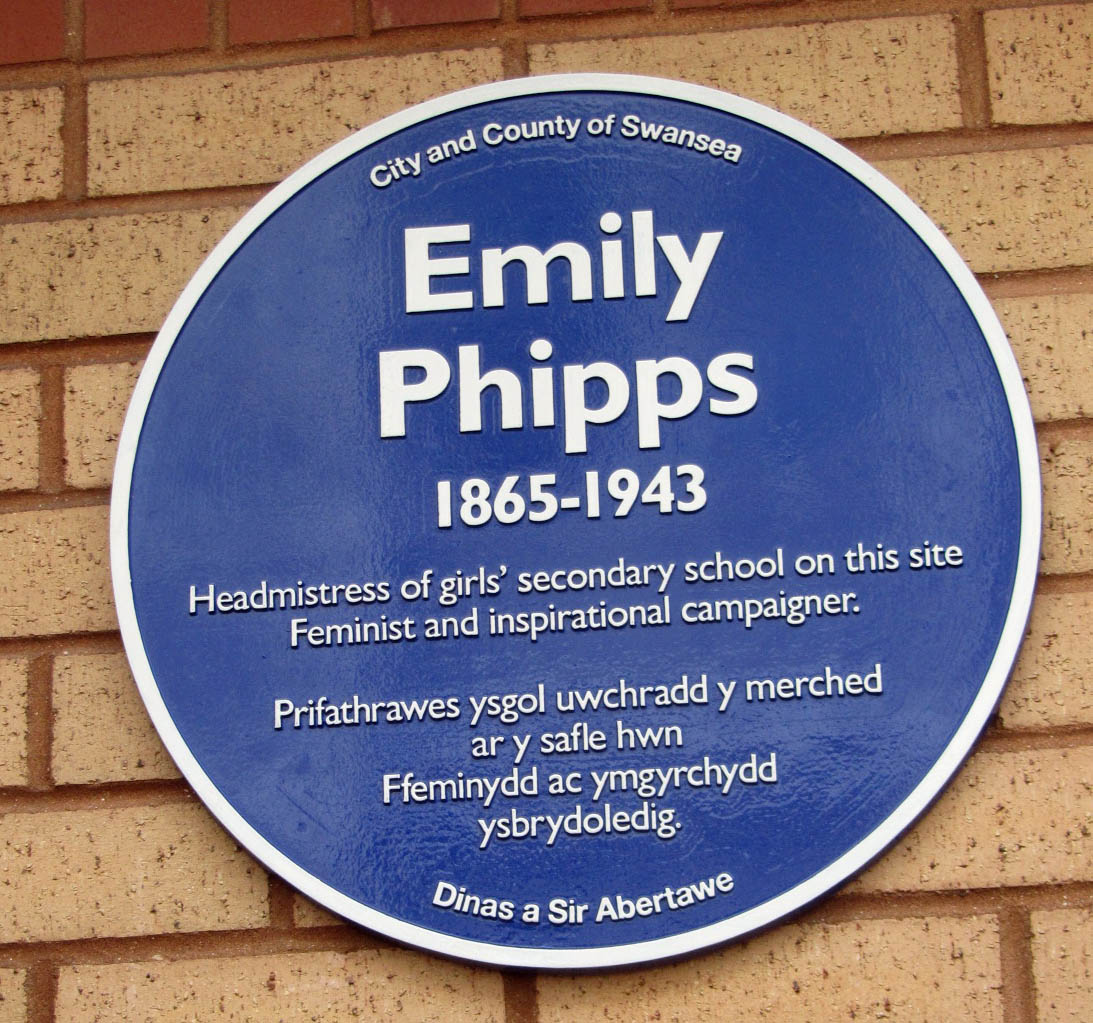
Blue Plaque to Emily Phipps, Orchard Street, Swansea

== Early life ==
The eldest of five siblings, Mary was born to Henry John Phipps, a coppersmith at Devonport Dockyard, and Mary Ann Phipps née Frost, on 7 November 1865 in Stoke Damarel, Devonport.

== Career ==
While working as a pupil teacher she studied in the evenings so that she could gain entrance to Homerton College, Cambridge. Phipps became head teacher of the infants' school attached to the college. After obtaining a first-class degree, in 1895 she successfully applied for the headship of Swansea Municipal Secondary Girls School. She left this position to return to Devonport where she worked again in an infant school. This time she studied for an external degree in Latin and Greek at London University.

A committed suffragette, she, together with fellow west country woman and lifelong friend Clara Neal (1870 -1936), joined the Women's Freedom League in 1908, following an anti-suffrage meeting in Swansea which was attended by the Welsh Liberal Party politician Lloyd George. She set up a local branch in Swansea in 1909. Like many other members of the Women's Freedom League, Neal and Phipps, together with two training college lecturers and a business woman, staged a boycott on the night of the 1911 Census, staying overnight in a sea cave on the nearby Gower Peninsula. At the NUWT dinner called to celebrate full female suffrage she explained the reason for the action: "Many women had determined that since they could not be citizens for the purposes of voting, they would not be citizens for the purpose of helping the government to compile statistics: they would not be included in the Census Returns."

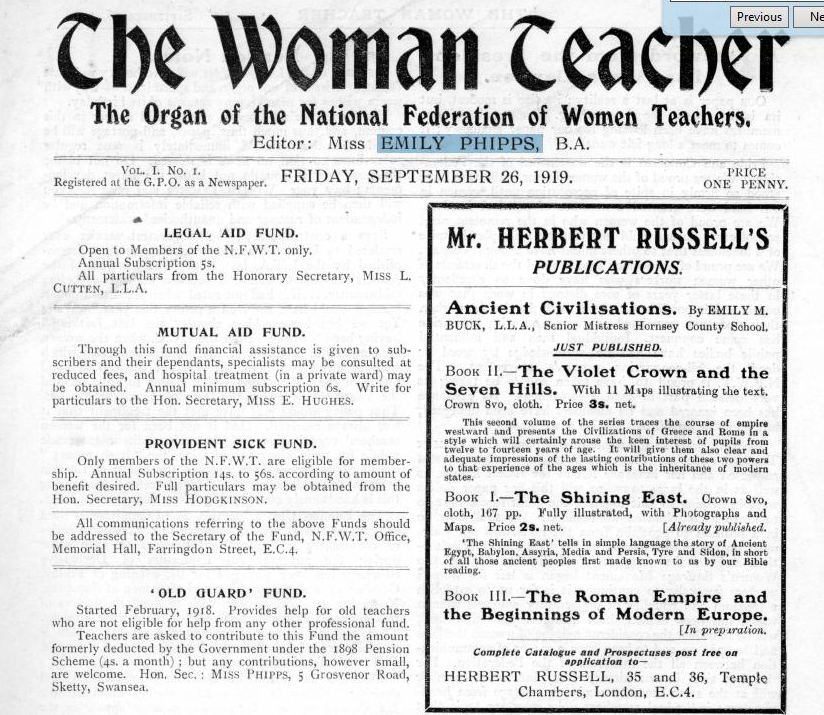
"The Woman Teacher" 26 September 1919, edited by Emily Phipps

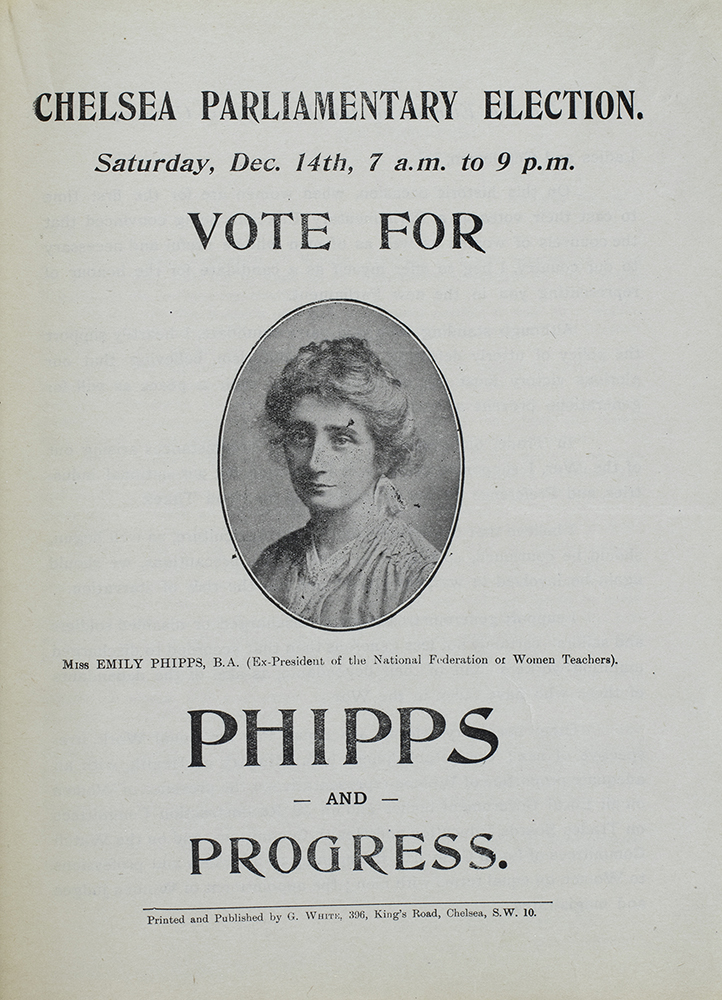
Phipps for MP on 14 December 1918

Emily Phipps was an active member of the National Union of Women Teachers (NUWT), which was formed as part of the National Union of Teachers (NUT) in 1906, following on from the Equal Pay League. (The NUWT became an independent organisation in 1920, and remained in operation until 1961). Emily was elected President for three successive years from 1915 to 1917 and was the first editor of the NUWT journal, Woman Teacher, from 1919 to 1930, later tasked with writing the History of the NUWT (published in 1928).

The 1918 general election was the first in which women could both vote in parliamentary elections and stand as candidates, and Emily Phipps was one of the 17 enfranchised women who took the opportunity to stand, becoming Independent Progressive candidate for Chelsea constituency with the backing of the NUWT. All the women candidates were heavily defeated, but she retained her deposit in a straight contest (with a low turnout) with the sitting Conservative MP, Sir Samuel Hoare. Whilst campaigning for election, she set up a model polling booth where women could practise voting. She also arranged for babysitters to look after women's babies so that they could vote, which the Sunday Mirror described as her organising 'a band of women helpers who looked after children whilst their mothers voted'.

== Later life and death ==
While still a head-teacher, Emily Phipps studied for the bar in the evenings and was admitted as a barrister in 1925. Following this, she gave up her teaching position and moved from Swansea to London, but although increasing ill health prevented her from practising in the courts for long, she remained as standing counsel to the National Union of Women Teachers. Clara Neal also resigned her own Swansea headship (she was initially head of Terrace Road School followed by Head of Glanmor Girls School from 1922) and moved to London sharing a house with Emily Phipps and former London teacher Adelaide Jones (amongst others) who had helped Phipps with her 1918 election campaign and who was full-time financial secretary to the NUWT from 1918.

Phipps had a talent for languages and although not fluent in all she had a working knowledge of French, German, Italian and Welsh.

In her spare time she would take part in embroidery, singing (she was a contralto), reading and gardening. She retired to Eastbourne, living with Adelaide Jones. She spent the last few months of her life living with her brother in Berkshire and died on 3 May 1943 of complications from a heart condition.

== Legacy ==
In the entry on Emily Phipps in the Oxford Dictionary of National Biography, Hilda Kean describes her versatility, "Known for her sparkling personality, wit and strong tongue she inspired a generation of women teachers. Her belief was 'if you make yourself a doormat, do not be surprised if people tread on you."

In 1990 Phipps was chosen with three others, Agnes Dawson, Theodora Bonwick and Ethel Froud, to be featured in Hilda Kean's book, 'Deeds Not Words: The Lives of Suffragette Teachers'.

A blue plaque was erected in 2013 in her honour in Swansea, located on the wall of the Orchard Centre Clinic in Trinity Place. This was the former the site of the Swansea Girl’s Secondary School where she taught.

== Sources ==
- Rolph, Avril, 'Definitely not a doormat: Emily Phipps, feminist, teacher and trade unionist', in Swansea History Journal / Minerva, No. 22, 2014–15, Swansea, Royal Institution of South Wales, 2014
- Kean, Hilda, Deeds not Words: The Lives of Suffragette Teachers, London, Pluto, 1990
- Oram, Alison 'Women teachers and feminist politics, 1900–39', Manchester, Manchester University Press, 1996
- Masson, Ursula, 'Swansea Suffragettes' in Women in Wales: a documentary history of our recent history, Volume 1. Ed Luana Dee and Katell Keineg, Cardiff, Womenwrite Press, 1987
- Wallace, Ryland 'The women's suffrage movement in Wales, 1866–1928', Cardiff, University of Wales Press, 2009
- Kean, Hilda, "Phipps, Emily Frost (1865–1943). Oxford Dictionary of National Biography (online ed.). Oxford University Press 2004; online edn, Jan 2008

== Archives ==
A collection of papers relating to Emily Phipps is held in Institute of Education Archives, University of London, National Union of Women Teachers Collection

Material relating to Emily Phipps' career and life in Swansea can be found in West Glamorgan Archives, Swansea and Swansea Central Library
