= Clara Neal =

English teacher and suffragette (1870–1936)

- Born: c. 1870; Devon, England
- Died: December 31, 1936 (aged 65–66)
- Occupations: teacher, school headmistress and suffragette
- Employer: Terrace Road School,
- Organization(s): National Union of Women Teachers (NUWT), Women's Freedom League (WFL)

Clara Edith Neal (c. 1870 – 31 December 1936) was an English teacher, school headmistress and suffragette leader in Wales.

== Life ==
Neal was born in Devon in 1870. Her parents were James Neal and Mahala Elizabeth Neal (née Vercoe).

Neal trained as a teacher and worked in Swansea, Wales. She was employed as the head of Terrace Road School in Mount Pleasant from 1901 to 1921, then worked as head of Glanmor Girls School in Swansea from 1922. She was a member of the National Union of Women Teachers (NUWT) and in 1929 she was elected as the teacher representative to the Board of Governors of the University College of South Wales and Monmouthshire (UCSWM).

A committed suffragette, Neal, together with fellow west country woman and lifelong friend Emily Phipps, joined the Women's Freedom League (WFL) in 1908, following an anti-suffrage meeting in Swansea attended by the Welsh Liberal Party politician David Lloyd George. Neal was thrown out of the meeting for asking questions about votes for women. With Phipps she cofounded a local Swansea branch in 1909, which had strong ties with the National Federation of Women Teachers. She also participated in the suffragette 1911 census boycott by hiding in a cave on the Gower peninsula overnight.

When women were allowed to vote for the first time in elections in 1918, Neal closed her school for the afternoon so that the school staff could all vote. She wrote in the school log book: "School closed in the afternoon to give the women teachers the opportunity to visit the Registration Court to claim their votes."

After retiring from teaching, Neal moved to London and shared a house with her lifelong friend Emily Phipps and another former teacher Adelaide Jones. She died in 1936.

== Legacy ==
A blue plaque was erected in 2018 in her honour in Swansea, located at Terrace Road School where she was headteacher for two decades.
