= Ethel Froud =

British trade unionist and feminist

- Born: Ethel Elizabeth Froud; 11 April 1880; Loose, Kent, England
- Died: May 21, 1941 (aged 61); Saltdean, East Sussex, England
- Occupations: Teacher, feminist, trade unionist
- Organisations: National Union of Teachers; Federation of Women Teachers; Women's Social and Political Union; Equal Political Rights Campaign; Teachers Labour League

Ethel Elizabeth Froud (11 April 1880 – 21 May 1941) was a British trade unionist and feminist. She helped create the National Union of Women Teachers as a British feminist autonomous union.

== Early life ==
She was the daughter of George Christopher Froud (a butcher) and Frances Danells, his wife. Although nothing is known of her early education, she became a teacher in the West Ham borough of east London.

== Union activity ==
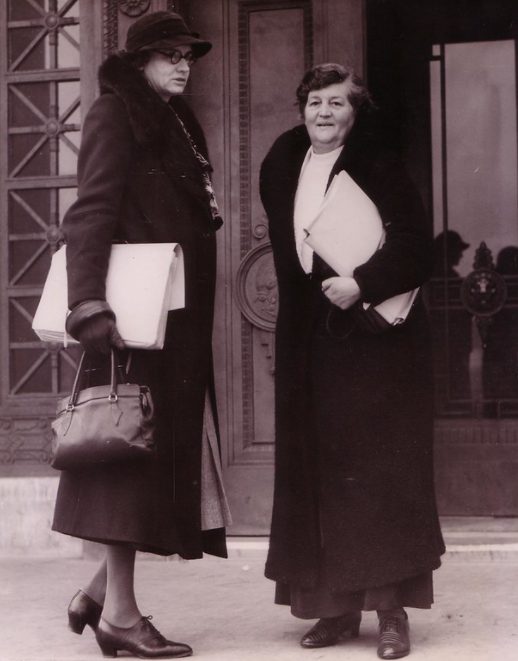
Muriel Pierotti and Ethel Froud in Swansea in 1938

As a member of the National Union of Teachers (NUT), she campaigned to create a franchise of women within the organization both locally and nationally without success. She joined the Women Teachers' Franchise Union and was a speaker and member of its committee for two years from 1915 to 1917. She also joined the National Federation of Women Teachers inside the NUT and became honorary secretary in 1913. She took over this position from Joseph Tate. She resigned from teaching in 1917 to become the first full-time paid secretary of the federation. She helped created the NUWT as a break-away group from the NUT as a feminist autonomous union. She was the first General Secretary of the National Union of Women Teachers (NUWT) from 1917-1940.

== Suffragette ==
She joined the Women's Social and Political Union (WSPU) as a militant suffragist and member of the fife and drum band, whose drum major was Mary Leigh. She spoke at suffrage meetings. At one point, she was protected from a mob at a railway station by being locked in a waiting room by the railway officials. She argued for equal pay at Trafalgar Square and at country-wide meetings. She was also an organizer and unifier within the NUWT, and often pulled together campaigns with other feminist groups, such as the Open Door Council and the Six Point Group in the 1920s.

== Politics ==
To defend her position that women should take part in public affairs, she ran for St Pancras Borough Council on the Labour Party platform in November 1925, but was unsuccessful. Her campaign slogan was 'deeds not words', also the slogan of the WSPU.

== Death and legacy ==
Froud never married and was quoted as saying 'we can't have it said that we celibates are only some fraction of a human being'. She died on 21 May 1941 at her new house "Rhondhurst" in Saltdean in Sussex. She had named the house after Lady Rhondda and Emily Pankhurst the year before. In 1990 Froud was chosen with three others, Agnes Dawson, Emily Phipps and headteacher Theodora Bonwick, to be featured in Hilda Kean's book, 'Deeds Not Words: The Lives of Suffragette Teachers'. Her belief system was summarized by a stained glass inscription in her office at NUWT headquarters that read, 'The dreams of those that labour are the only ones that ever come true.'

Trade union offices
| Preceded by Joseph Tate | General Secretary of the National Union of Women Teachers; 1913–1940 | Succeeded by Muriel Pierotti |
