= John Straffen =

British serial killer (1930–2007)

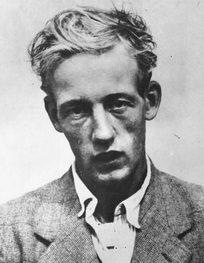
- Mug shot of Straffen, taken in April 1952
- Born: John Thomas Straffen; 27 February 1930; Bordon Camp, Hampshire, England
- Died: 19 November 2007 (aged 77); HM Prison Frankland, County Durham, England
- Motive: Inconclusive (likely revenge with grandiosity accompaniment)
- Penalty: Detained at Her Majesty's pleasure (17 October 1951); Death (24 July 1952); Commuted to life imprisonment (29 August 1952)

Details
- Victims: 3
- Span of crimes: 15 July 1951 – 29 April 1952
- Country: United Kingdom
- Locations: Somerset, England (1951); Berkshire, England (1952)
- Date apprehended: 9 August 1951

John Thomas Straffen (27 February 1930 – 19 November 2007) was an English serial killer who committed the murder of three prepubescent girls between the ages of five and nine in the counties of Somerset and Berkshire, England, between 1951 and 1952.

All three of Straffen's victims were murdered by strangulation. His first two victims were murdered in Bath, Somerset, in the summer of 1951. Arrested shortly after the murder of his second victim, Straffen denied any sexual or sadistic motive for the murders, which he insisted he had committed to simply "annoy" the police, whom he blamed for most of his problems.

Tried before Mr Justice Oliver at Taunton Assizes in October 1951, Straffen was found unfit to plead on the grounds of diminished responsibility and committed to indefinite detention within Broadmoor Hospital. He briefly escaped from this facility in April 1952 and murdered a third child in the village of Farley Hill, Berkshire, in the four hours he remained at liberty prior to his recapture.

Straffen was brought to trial for this third murder at Winchester Assizes in July 1952; he was ultimately convicted and sentenced to death, although his sentence was later commuted to life imprisonment by the Home Secretary following his personal recommendation to the Queen that Straffen be reprieved. He remained incarcerated until his death within HM Prison Frankland in November 2007.

At the time of Straffen's death, he was the longest-serving prisoner in British history, having served over 55 years' imprisonment.

== Early life ==
John Thomas Straffen was born on 27 February 1930 at Bordon Camp in Hampshire. He was the third of six children born to John and Elizabeth (née Morgan) Straffen, with one older brother and sister, and three younger sisters. (Note: Straffen's older sister, Elizabeth, regarded as a "high grade mental defective", died at age 23 in 1952.) At the time of Straffen's birth, his father served in the British Army, and his mother was a homemaker. When Straffen was two years old, his father was deployed overseas and the family spent six years in British India.

Straffen's early childhood was unremarkable. His mother would later recollect her son displayed no signs of mental limitation or behavioural problems until after he was stricken with encephalitis at age six during his father's tour of military duty in British India. Following his recovery, Straffen began to exhibit traits of antisocial behaviour. The family returned to the United Kingdom in March 1938, settling in a suburb of Bath, Somerset. Shortly thereafter, Straffen's father was discharged from the Army.

Upon his family's return to England, Straffen began committing acts of petty theft in addition to frequently truanting from school. He was referred to a child guidance clinic for this behaviour in October 1938. Eight months later, Straffen first appeared before a juvenile court for stealing a purse from a young girl; he was sentenced to two years' probation. Straffen's assigned probation officer discovered that he did not understand the general difference between right and wrong, or the meaning of probation. The Straffen family was living in crowded lodgings at the time, and his mother—with five other children—had little time to devote exclusively to her son. As such, Straffen's probation officer referred him to a psychiatrist, who officially diagnosed Straffen as a mentally defective individual.

In June 1940, the local council referred Straffen to St Joseph's School, a residential school for mentally defective children in Sambourne, Warwickshire, with instruction he remain housed within structured facilities of this nature until age sixteen. The same year, Straffen underwent an intellectual assessment, which revealed his IQ to be 58 and his mental age to be six years.

Straffen would remain at St Joseph's until 1942, when he transferred to Besford Court School in Defford, Worcestershire. Here, he was observed by staff to be something of a solitary individual and markedly resentful of having been placed in a structured environment by authorities. A second intellectual assessment conducted in the mid-1940s revised Straffen's IQ to 64; his mental age was also revised to nine years, six months. He would remain at this facility until March 1946.

=== Adolescence ===
Straffen was released from Besford Court School shortly after his sixteenth birthday; he returned to live with his family in Bath. The same year, an examination by the Medical Officer of Health concluded that although potentially capable of basic manual labour, he still warranted certification under the Mental Deficiency Act. After several short-term menial jobs, Straffen obtained more stable employment as a machinist in a clothing factory. This employment lasted ten months before he was made redundant in 1947. Shortly thereafter, Straffen began to enter unoccupied local homes and steal small items; he is not known to have taken these stolen artifacts home or given these items to others, but instead typically hid or discarded them. As Straffen had no close friends, he invariably committed these burglaries alone.

On 27 July 1947, a 13-year-old girl reported to police that a blond-haired teenager named John had sexually assaulted her after putting his hand over her mouth and saying: "What would you do if I killed you? I have done it before." The police were unable to locate the assailant and would only link Straffen to this offence much later. Six weeks after committing the sexual assault, Straffen is known to have strangled five chickens belonging to the father of a teenage girl with whom he had recently argued.

== HM Prison Horfield ==
In the autumn of 1947 Straffen was arrested for burglary; he willingly confessed to the offence in addition to having committed thirteen other burglaries, many of which police had not linked to the same offender. He was remanded in custody and, on 10 October, was committed to HM Prison Horfield in Bristol under the Mental Deficiency Act 1913, with his committal paperwork stating Straffen was "not of violent or dangerous propensities." (Note: HM Prison Horfield specialised in treating non-violent, mentally disabled offenders for gradual rehabilitation and resettlement into society.) Straffen would remain at this facility for twenty months, during which he underwent a psychiatric examination by the medical superintendent, who officially classified Straffen as being intellectually disabled.

Straffen was isolated from other inmates at Horfield and well-behaved. As a result, in July 1949 he was transferred to a lower-security agricultural hostel in Winchester. Here, he initially functioned well, but soon relapsed into committing acts of petty theft within the facility. When he stole a bag of walnuts in February 1950, he was sent back to HM Prison Horfield. Six months later, he was disciplined by staff for leaving the facility without authorisation and resisting police when they attempted to return him to Horfield.

=== Unsupervised home leave ===
In early 1951, Straffen was examined at a Bristol hospital, where an electroencephalograph reading revealed he had suffered "wide and severe damage to the cerebral cortex"—possibly originating from his being stricken with encephalitis at the age of six. However, Straffen was considered sufficiently rehabilitated to be allowed short periods of unsupervised home leave. He used the time to obtain a job at a market garden as an odd-job man using the skills he had honed while residing in Winchester.

== Rehabilitation into society ==
News of Straffen independently obtaining employment greatly impressed Hortham officials, and he was allowed to keep his horticultural job. Shortly thereafter, staff authorised Straffen to be returned to the care of his family, who by 1951 resided in Fountain Buildings, Bath.

By law, under the Mental Deficiency Act, Straffen underwent a further psychological assessment by Hortham medical staff shortly after his twenty-first birthday; these officials recommended he remain classified as mentally deficient for a further five years. His family disputed the outcome of this assessment and appealed the decision. Shortly thereafter, 10 July 1951, the Medical Officer of Health for Bath re-examined Straffen and found an improvement in his mental age to ten years; he recommended that Straffen's certificate of mental deficiency be renewed only for six months with a view to discharge at the end.

Two days prior to this re-assessment, a seven-year-old girl named Christine Vivian Butcher had been murdered in Windsor, Berkshire. The child had been raped, then strangled to death with the belt from her own raincoat. Her murder was never solved. Although Straffen is not considered a suspect in this case, according to author Letitia Fairfield, the intense police and public outrage generated by the case may have led Straffen—with his lifelong "intense resentment" and "smouldering hatred" of police—to believe the act of strangling young girls would cause maximum frustration and outrage to the authorities.

== Murders ==
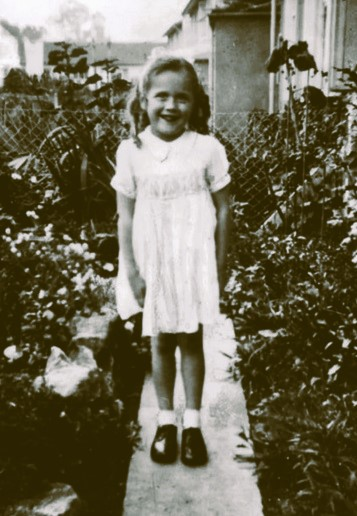
Brenda Goddard, c. 1951

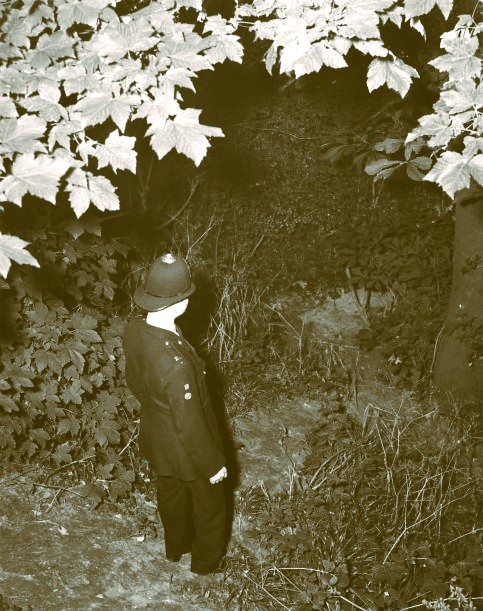
The copse where the body of Brenda Goddard was discovered, 16 July 1951

=== Brenda Goddard ===
On the afternoon of 15 July 1951, Straffen left his home to visit the local cinema unaccompanied, as he typically did on a Sunday. His route took him past 1 Camden Crescent in Bath, where 5-year-old Brenda Constance Goddard lived with her foster parents. (Note: Brenda's mother, Constance, had been widowed when Brenda was a toddler. As she worked full-time at the Royal National Hospital for Rheumatic Diseases, she was unable to devote sufficient time to her only child, and Brenda had been placed in the foster care of a Mr and Mrs Pullen in November 1949. Nonetheless, the child maintained regular contact with her mother.) Although the child was not allowed to venture out of her garden when playing while unsupervised, on this day, she evidently crossed the road to a meadow close to her home to gather buttercups and daisies.

According to Straffen's later statement to the police, he initially observed Brenda as she gathered flowers in this meadow and the child "looked up and smiled" at him before he asked her, "What are you doing?" to which Brenda replied "Picking flowers" before extending her arm to display a "bunch of white flowers" as she continued to smile. After learning Brenda's name, Straffen stated: "I know a place where there are even more flowers; they're in that wood. Shall I show you?" Brenda eagerly agreed.

At the entrance to a nearby copse, Brenda allowed Straffen to lift her over a fence. Almost immediately thereafter, Straffen manually strangled the child although as he was both confused and frustrated that Brenda did not attempt to scream prior to lapsing into unconsciousness, he then repeatedly struck her head against a large stone. Straffen did not make any attempt to hide the body and simply continued to the cinema to watch the film Shockproof, after which he returned home.

Brenda's foster mother reported her missing at 3:15 p.m.; her body was discovered by a police officer at 7:10 p.m. The location of her body was just three hundred yards from her home. No effort had been made to conceal her body, and numerous clipped white convolvulus flowers were found at the crime scene. The child had not been sexually assaulted, and investigators were unable to determine the actual motive for the crime.

After eliminating Brenda's biological and foster family as suspects, police began questioning all locals with criminal records. Straffen was questioned by Bath City Police in relation to Brenda's murder on 3 August. He admitted to having worn a navy blue suit on the date of the child's death and that he may have been the individual in such attire seen by Brenda's foster mother walking past her home shortly before she had noticed Brenda missing from her front garden, but he denied any involvement in the murder. As police had no physical evidence linking Straffen to Brenda's murder, they were unable to charge him with the crime.

==== Employment dismissal ====
Prior to Straffen's formal interview regarding Brenda's murder, police had also contacted his employer to verify his movements on the date of her death; this resulted in Straffen being dismissed on 31 July. Although Straffen blamed the police for his dismissal, his employer would later state he had already been planning to "lay [Straffen] off" within days of his interview with the police due to Straffen's recent lack of commitment to his work duties and his bizarre habit of hoarding flowers and vegetables in locations where he apparently believed they would not be found.

In a later interview given to a prison psychiatrist, Straffen confirmed that although he was not charged with Brenda's murder, he had known he remained under suspicion following his interview and resolved to continue to antagonise the police, with his dismissal likely furthering this desire.

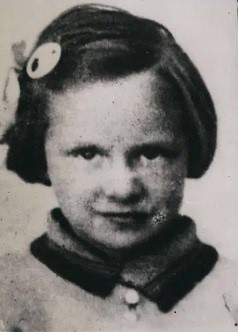
Cicely Batstone, c. 1949

=== Cicely Batstone ===
On 8 August, Straffen encountered 9-year-old Cicely Dorothy Batstone at the Forum Cinema in Bath as the two watched Tarzan and the Jungle Queen. He offered the child a sweet and the two engaged in conversation, with Cicely informing Straffen her mother had allowed her to travel to the cinema alone as it was "children's day"—although she was unsure of the exact meaning of this term. In response, Straffen replied that the term likely meant children could do as they pleased for the entire day.

Upon the film's conclusion, Straffen offered to accompany Cicely to another local cinema to watch the Western She Wore a Yellow Ribbon with the added promise of paying her admission fee. Cicely agreed, and the two travelled via bus across town. Shortly after alighting the bus, the two were observed walking along Bloomfield Road in the direction of the meadow at approximately 8 p.m. by a woman named Violet Cowley. Cowley—the wife of a policeman—would later state the sight of the two had made her feel "uneasy".

Shortly after entering a meadow known locally as "The Tumps", Cicely was manually strangled to death. Straffen then walked home, purchasing fish and chips en route.

=== Missing person report ===
Cicely's parents had been socialising with friends on the afternoon of 8 August upon the understanding her 16-year-old sister, Gladys, would be at the family home at a prearranged time to supervise her sister when she returned from the cinema; however, when Cicely failed to return home, Gladys initially assumed she was with their parents. As such, the child was not reported missing until shortly before 11 p.m. A large-scale manhunt was immediately implemented to locate the child.

Prior to learning of Cicely's disappearance, Violet Cowley—mindful of the recent, unsolved murder of Brenda Goddard—had mentioned to her policeman husband having observed a young, dark-haired girl dressed in a grey cardigan and a coloured dress walking in the direction of The Tumps in the company of a blond-haired, slender young man and how the sighting had made her uneasy. Upon learning of Cicely's disappearance early the following morning and the manhunt to locate the child, Cowley directed police to the location she had seen the two. Cicely's body was discovered beneath a hedge at 8:30 a.m.

=== Eyewitness statements ===
In addition to Violet Cowley, numerous other eyewitnesses had observed Straffen in Cicely's company prior to her murder. These individuals included the driver of the bus Cicely had boarded, who informed investigators on the morning of 9 August the child had been in the company of a young, blond-haired man, the bus conductor—who also recognised Straffen as a former colleague—and a courting couple walking through The Tumps who observed the "laughing child" in the company of an individual matching Straffen's description. (Note: According to Straffen's later confession, he had been lightheartedly playing with Cicely in The Tumps when he had observed the courting couple. He had stood and silently stared at the couple as they walked by as Cicely giggled before he kneeled to the ground and strangled the child to death.)

== Arrest ==
She was a bright little girl and we were talking together in the downstairs seats. We saw the film through, came out (of the cinema) together and it was light ... we passed through a gate into a field and walked up the slope behind the hedge. She said she was tired and laid on the grass ... I was holding her in the front by her neck. She was dead when I left her but you cannot prove it.

— John Straffen, confessing to the murder of Cicely Batstone, 9 August 1951.

Police drove to Straffen's home to question him in relation to Cicely's murder on the morning of 9 August. According to investigators, when informed of the purpose of their visit, Straffen replied: "Is it about the girl I was at the pictures with last night?" He was then driven to the Old Police Station to face formal questioning.

=== Confession ===
Straffen readily admitted to investigators he had been in Cicely's company on the afternoon of her murder; however, he initially denied any culpability in her death—insisting the child had been asleep in The Tumps when he last saw her. Shortly thereafter, he revised this statement to admit he knew Cicely was deceased, stating: "She is dead, but you can't prove I did it because no-one saw me". He also willingly confessed to the murder of Brenda Goddard, stating: "The other girl, I did her the same". When questioned as to why he had killed the children, Straffen stated he had committed both murders to give the police "something to really do" as opposed to continually pursuing him for relatively trivial offences. He was formally charged with the murder of Cicely Batstone the following day.

=== Formal charges ===
Straffen formally appeared at the Guildhall in Bath on 24 August 1951, charged with both child murders; he pleaded not guilty to the charges on this date and was remanded in custody until 30 August. On 31 August, after a two-day hearing at Bath Magistrates' Court, a formal date was set for Straffen to stand trial for the murder of Cicely Batstone. (Note: Contemporary English law only permitted a defendant to be charged with one murder at any given time.)

== First murder trial ==
Straffen stood trial at Taunton Assize Court on 17 October 1951. He was tried before Mr Justice Oliver.

The only witness to testify at this eight-minute hearing was the medical superintendent at HM Prison Horfield, Peter Parkes, who testified to having reviewed Straffen on numerous occasions between 1947 and 1951 and that his current level of mental deficiency remained "very much the same" as it had in 1947. Parkes also testified as to Straffen's inability to appreciate or understand the circumstances and procedures of the legal process.

Following Parkes' testimony, Judge Oliver informed the jury: "In this country we do not try people who are insane. You might as well try a baby in arms. If a man cannot understand what is going on, he cannot be tried." As such, the jury formally ruled that Straffen was insane and unfit to plead. He was ordered to be detained at His Majesty's pleasure at Broadmoor Hospital (then known as Broadmoor Asylum for the Criminally Insane) in Crowthorne, Berkshire.

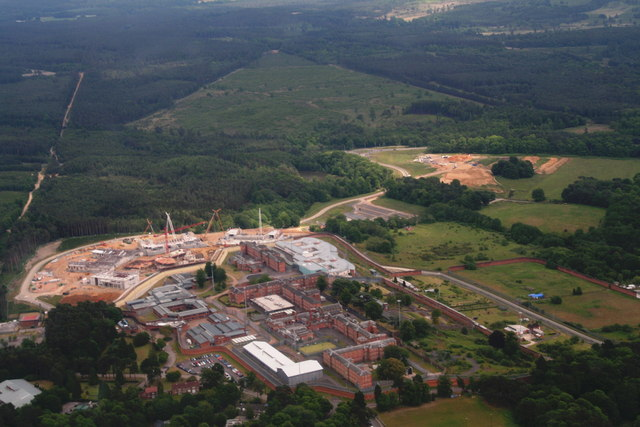
Broadmoor Hospital. Straffen was able to escape from this facility due to security lapses on 29 April 1952.

=== Committal to Broadmoor ===
Constructed in the 19th century, Broadmoor Hospital had originally been termed a criminal lunatic asylum; however, the Criminal Justice Act 1948 transferred all responsibility for the institution to the Ministry of Health, and those committed to the facility had been reclassified from "inmates" to "patients" by the time of Straffen's committal. As such, all patients within the facility were subjected to a more humane regime. Shortly after arriving at this 40-acre institution, Straffen was assigned work as a cleaner.

=== Escape ===
At 2:25 p.m. on 29 April 1952, Straffen—wearing his own civilian clothing beneath his assigned work uniform—managed to surmount Broadmoor's ten-foot (3 m) wall by climbing onto the slate roof of a lean-to shed with the assistance of large disinfectant drums placed against the wall of the institution during an assigned work detail to clean a dilapidated outbuilding. He was briefly unsupervised at the time of climbing onto the slate roof after the sole guard assigned to his work detail left him unattended as he oversaw the cleaning work of other inmates. Straffen then scaled the remaining eighteen inches to the top of the perimeter wall and lowered himself to the ground. His escape was quickly noticed, and local police notified. A manhunt to re-apprehend Straffen was immediately implemented.

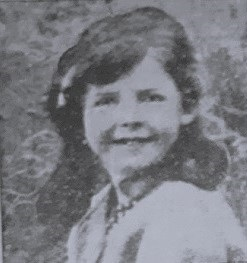
Linda Bowyer

== Murder of Linda Bowyer ==
Upon escaping from Broadmoor, Straffen is known to have discarded his work uniform and travelled approximately 7 miles (11 km) over the course of two hours on foot before arriving in the village of Farley Hill where, according to eyewitnesses, he began loitering without apparent purpose.

At approximately 5:30 p.m., a resident glanced from a cottage window to observe Straffen sitting on a bench watching five-year-old Linda Bowyer randomly riding her new bicycle around the village. The final reliable eyewitness sighting of the child alive occurred at approximately 5:50 p.m. Shortly thereafter, Linda Bowyer was lured to a nearby field and manually strangled to death before Straffen walked to a nearby household to ask the occupant, a Mrs Loyalty Kenyon, for a glass of water and directions to Wokingham. Shortly thereafter, Straffen thumbed a lift from a female motorist, requesting she drive him to the Bramshill Hunt bus stop.

As the motorist approached the bus stop, Straffen observed several men standing close to the bus stop, causing him to nervously remark: "Is that the police? What are they doing?" He then alighted the vehicle and walked briskly in the direction of a nearby pub as the motorist spoke to the men, whom she learned were Broadmoor staff members and policemen. Straffen was observed talking to several young children in a lane some 150 yards behind the pub minutes later; he was arrested in a field at 6:40 p.m. following a brief chase and struggle.

=== Body discovery ===
Linda's mother first noticed her daughter's disappearance at 7:30 p.m. when the child failed to return home or respond to her subsequent calling her name aloud from her garden gate. With the assistance of soldiers stationed at Arborfield military camp, police immediately implemented a manhunt to locate the child, and Linda's fully clothed, strangled body was found beneath an oak tree within a bluebell copse by Sergeant Percy Axford at 5:25 the following morning. (Note: The location of Linda Bowyer's body was approximately 2 miles (3.2 km) from the scene of Straffen's recapture.) An autopsy revealed the child had been deceased for between twelve and fifteen hours, and that she had not been sexually assaulted.

Investigators immediately travelled to Broadmoor to question Straffen as to whether he had committed any further crimes while he had escaped from the institution. When awoken and politely asked by Chief Inspector Frederick Francis whether he had committed "any mischief" the previous day, Straffen simply replied, "I did not kill her" before elaborating: "I know you coppers! I know I killed [Goddard and Batstone], but I did not kill the little girl on the bicycle." (Note: Although staff at Broadmoor Hospital would later claim Straffen had not read any newspapers prior to speaking with Chief Inspector Francis, an individual would claim in 2001 that Straffen had indeed read the morning newspapers prior to speaking with Francis and thus knew of the child's murder prior to his questioning.)

News of Straffen's escape and the fact he had committed a third child murder prior to his recapture sparked intense public outrage, with security within the facility subject to particular scrutiny. (Note: In the years prior to Straffen's escape from Broadmoor, employees at the institution had officially complained of a lack of manpower at the facility.) According to contemporary press reports, Straffen later claimed before court officials his escape had been to prove he "could be out without killing little children."

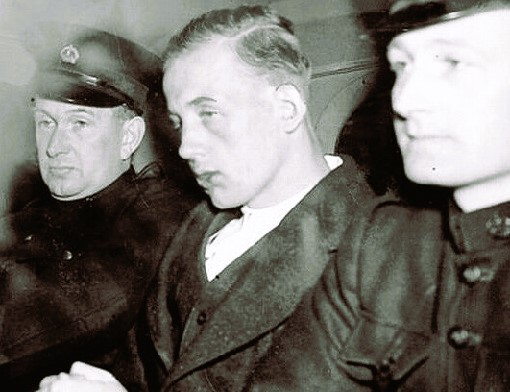
Straffen, pictured on 2 May 1952 en route to Reading Magistrates' Court to be formally charged with the murder of Linda Bowyer

=== Further murder charge ===
On 1 May 1952, investigators successfully applied for a warrant to formally charge Straffen with the murder of Linda Bowyer. He appeared at Reading Magistrates' Court the following day to be notified of this formal murder charge and was detained in the hospital wing of HM Prison Brixton to await trial for her murder.

Within months of Straffen's recapture, security measures at Broadmoor had sufficiently increased to resemble those within a Category A prison. His escape and further murder also inspired the implementation of the activation of a system of warning sirens around Broadmoor to alert staff and the public alike upon the event of an inmate's escape from the facility, with the sirens tested on a weekly basis. (Note: This practice of testing the warning sirens on a weekly basis at Broadmoor would remain in operation until 2016.)

== Second murder trial ==
Straffen was brought to trial at Winchester Assizes for the murder of Linda Bowyer on 21 July 1952. He was tried before Mr Justice Cassels. The prosecution was led by Solicitor-General Sir Reginald Manningham-Buller. Straffen was defended by Henry Elam.

Upon advice from his defence counsel, Straffen pleaded not guilty to the charge and on the trial's opening date, his defence lawyer informed jurors his client would not testify on his own behalf as he was mentally defective, stating: "A person found unfit to plead cannot make a proper defence and cannot follow the details of the evidence." The defence also opted to leave the question of his sanity as an issue to be determined by the jury. (Note: On the evening of the trial's opening date, one of the selected jurors attended a local club, where he publicly declared that one of the prosecution witnesses had murdered Linda Bowyer. Word of this misconduct soon reached the trial judge, who announced the following morning that the jury would be discharged and the trial would recommence with a new jury. Mr. Justice Cassels also ordered the errant juror to remain in court throughout the trial, before calling him to publicly apologise for his "wicked discharge of [his] duties as a citizen".)

At the request of the prosecution, Mr Justice Cassels ruled in the trial's opening stages that evidence pertaining to Straffen's two prior murders would be admissible as similar fact evidence, and the lack of any obvious motive for Linda's murder (as had been the case with Brenda Goddard and Cicely Batstone), the ages of the three children, the fact that none of the crime scenes bore any evidence of a physical struggle between the child and her murderer, and the fact no effort had been made to conceal any of the children's bodies was discussed at trial by the prosecution and witnesses to testify on their behalf.

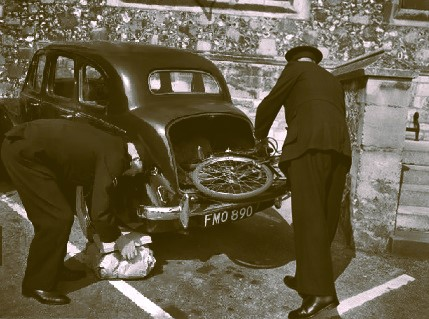
Linda Bowyer's bicycle is retrieved from a police vehicle to be introduced as evidence at Straffen's second murder trial.

=== Witness testimony ===
The prosecution contention was that Straffen had been the individual who had murdered Linda in the four hours he had remained at liberty prior to his recapture, with Manningham-Buller informing the jurors police had been able to account for Straffen's movements throughout the entire duration of his liberty via eyewitness testimony and the known duration of his movements save for the "vital twenty minutes" between which the child had last been seen alive riding her bicycle within Farley Hill and prior to Straffen knocking on Mrs Kenyon's door to ask for a glass of water. Manningham-Buller further informed the jury a reconstruction of the movements from where Straffen had been observed sitting and watching Linda ride her bicycle to the copse where her body was discovered revealed the route would have taken him approximately six minutes and thirty seconds to walk.

On 23 July, the pathologist who had performed the autopsy on Linda Bowyer, Dr Robert Donald Teare, testified that the pressure applied to the child's neck had been "determined and applied at exactly the right points, as if by a person experienced in this method of killing". Teare further testified that, having studied post-mortem photographs and the autopsy reports of the two children Straffen had confessed to murdering in Bath, he had noted "many similarities" in the method of strangulation applied to Brenda and Cicely that had been applied to Linda.

Straffen's defence called several individuals who had previously evaluated their client to give evidence about his mental condition in addition to a woman and her son who had heard the scream of a young girl emanating from the direction of the copse where Linda's body was discovered at approximately 6:45 p.m. on the date of her disappearance—thus suggesting the child had been murdered after Straffen had been re-apprehended.

In rebuttal to the defence's arguments regarding Straffen's limited intellect and inability to differentiate right from wrong, Manningham-Buller called several Broadmoor prison medical officers and psychiatrists to testify as to their treatment methods prior to Straffen's escape from the facility improving his knowledge and IQ to the extent he knew the difference between right and wrong, and was able to understand the basic principles pertaining to the consequential legal process as a result of his actions. One of these individuals, Thomas Munro—an expert in the treatment of mental deficiency—testified that Straffen had informed him that to commit the act of murder was wrong both because it broke the rule of law and because the act was "one of the commandments".

== Conviction ==
Straffen's second murder trial lasted four days. Upon completion of both counsels' closing arguments, Mr Justice Cassels delivered his final instructions to the jury, in which he emphasised: "If you are satisfied that the prisoner killed Linda Bowyer, then the [insanity] issue raised by the defence calls for your consideration. To establish a defence of insanity it must be clearly proved that the prisoner at the time of committing the act was labouring under such a defect of reason of the mind as not to know the nature and quality of the act he was [committing], or that he did not know it was wrong according to law ... He has been certified as a mental defective and when you look at all the medical evidence on both sides, no witness has said that, even within the meaning of medicine, this man is insane."

The jury deliberated for just twenty-nine minutes before announcing they had reached a verdict of guilty. Consequently, Mr Justice Cassels sentenced Straffen to death, informing him his crime "was a cruel and brutal act you committed knowingly on that girl." Straffen displayed no emotion upon hearing the sentence passed, although his mother had to be escorted from the courtroom by her elder son Roy as she exclaimed, "He didn't do it!". The mothers of all three of Straffen's victims were present within the courtroom to hear the judge sentence Straffen to death.

=== Appeal and reprieve ===
Straffen appealed his conviction, contending his trial judge had prejudiced the jury by allowing into admission the evidence of his two previous murders as similar fact evidence, and that his verbal statements to investigators on the morning after Linda Bowyer's murder were also wrongly admitted because they had been made before he was formally cautioned. Both grounds of the appeal were dismissed on 26 August, and Straffen was refused leave to appeal to the House of Lords. His execution date was fixed for 4 September; however, this sentence was commuted to one of life imprisonment by Home Secretary David Maxwell Fyfe on 29 August, following his personal recommendation to the Queen that Straffen be reprieved.

== Imprisonment ==
Following his reprieve, Straffen was moved from Broadmoor to HM Prison Wandsworth. Four years later, in 1956, he was transferred back to HM Prison Horfield after staff uncovered an impending attempt by prisoners—including Straffen—to escape from the facility, with Straffen's fellow conspirators in this plot reportedly choosing to initially take Straffen with them to divert primary police and public focus away from themselves. The news of Straffen's return to a Bristol prison caused intense public outrage in the city, and a petition demanding his transferral from the prison was signed by over 12,000 people, although this petition was unsuccessful. While incarcerated at HM Prison Horfield, Straffen reportedly enquired to the governor each month whether a formal date had been set for his release.

In August 1958, Straffen was transferred to HM Prison Cardiff when the security regime at HM Prison Horfield was adjusted to a less severe level. This transferral was relatively brief and by June 1960, he had been transferred back to a maximum security block within HM Prison Horfield.

Following the completion of the construction of a 28-cell high-security wing at HM Prison Parkhurst on the Isle of Wight in early 1966, Straffen was secretly transferred to this facility on 31 January of that year. Two years later, in May 1968, Straffen was transferred to HM Prison Durham, where he was incarcerated in a high-security section of the prison. Here, he was observed to be taciturn, aloof, and hostile—"circling, banging the fence every couple of minutes" and seldom talking "unless he has to ask for something. Always on his own." (Note: Crime author Jonathan Goodman would later opine of Straffen while he was incarcerated at HM Prison Durham that he was incarcerated within this prison "only because no mental institution is secure enough to guarantee his confinement.")

=== Legal barriers ===
For the first five decades of Straffen's incarceration, the Home Secretary held the power of discretion to overrule any recommendations or decisions made to release any prisoner serving a life sentence either recommended for parole, or who had served the minimum term imposed at trial. Successive individuals appointed to this position refused to consider Straffen for release. A list of twenty prisoners serving life sentences who would never be released from custody compiled by then-Home Secretary Michael Howard in 1994 included Straffen's name; this list was later published by the News of the World in December 1997.

In 2001, Straffen's solicitors formally requested his case be reopened on the grounds that he had never been fit to stand trial as a sane individual. This development was announced shortly after investigative journalist Robert Woffinden, having examined records previously undisclosed to the public, had discovered that Straffen's death sentence had been reprieved by David Maxwell Fyfe due to the majority of the doctors who had examined Straffen prior to his second trial declaring him insane. Woffinden also questioned Straffen's guilt in the murder of Linda Bowyer because at the time of his arrest, he had bitten his fingernails to the hilt, whereas distinctive fingernail marks were discovered on the child's neck in addition to the fact two local witnesses had placed the approximate time of her murder after Straffen's recapture.

Straffen's application to the Criminal Cases Review Commission to have his conviction reviewed was turned down in December 2002.

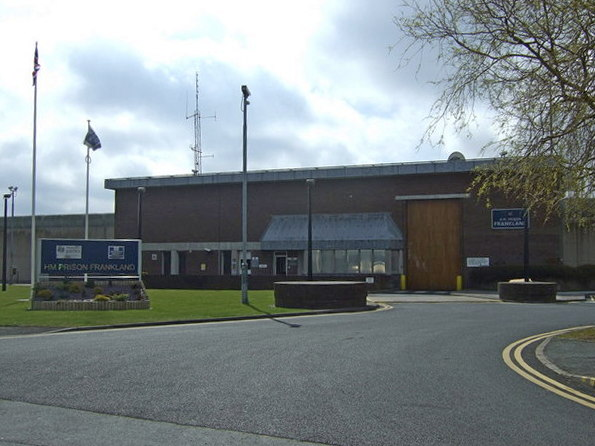
HM Prison Frankland. Straffen died of natural causes within this facility on 19 November 2007.

=== Later developments ===
In May 2002, the European Court of Human Rights (ECtHR) began ruling upon decisions made in cases brought by prisoners serving a term of life imprisonment who challenged the authority of the Home Secretary to refuse to release them after the parole board had recommended they be freed. The ECtHR ultimately decided that politicians should not decide the minimum terms of imprisonment for prisoners serving life sentences and that as such, the current practice of Home Secretaries overruling parole board decisions was unlawful. At the time of these developments, Straffen was incarcerated at HM Prison Long Lartin.

== Death ==
John Straffen died of natural causes within the health care centre of HM Prison Frankland following a brief illness on the morning of 19 November 2007. At the time of Straffen's death, he was 77 years old and had been incarcerated for 55 years, 3 months, and 26 days and was the longest-serving prisoner in British criminal history. (Note: Straffen's record as the longest-serving prisoner in British criminal history would later be surpassed by child killer Ian Brady.)

Despite ample circumstantial evidence attesting to his guilt in the murder of Linda Bowyer, Straffen always denied any culpability in her death, although he admitted to having murdered Brenda Goddard and Cicely Batstone.

Three days after Straffen's death, Guardian columnist and investigative journalist Robert Woffinden penned an obituary article in which he opined that Straffen would be remembered by many within the United Kingdom as "one of the country's most notorious child murderers".

== Media ==
=== Literature ===
- Fairfield, Letitia; Fullbrook, Eric P., eds. (1995) [1954]. The Trial of John Thomas Straffen. Notable British Trials. London: William Hodge. ISBN 978-1-561-69191-3.
- Lowe, Gordon (2013). Escape from Broadmoor: The Trials and Strangulations of John Thomas Straffen. Cheltenham, Gloucestershire: The History Press. ISBN 978-0-752-49292-6.
- Pender, Patrick (1994). "Murder in the Meadows". Real-Life Crimes (99). London, England: Eaglemoss Publications Ltd.: 2174–2181. ISBN 978-1-856-29970-1.
- Tulley, Mark (1994). "The Escape of John Straffen". Killers (6). London, England: Nexus Media Limited: 53–66. ISSN 1352-5654.

=== Television ===
- The Crime & Investigation Network have broadcast an episode focusing on the murders committed by John Straffen as part of their Murder Casebook series. Presented by Fred Dinenage, this 45-minute episode was first broadcast in November 2012 and features interviews with criminologist David Wilson.

== See also ==
- Capital punishment in the United Kingdom
- HM Prison Frankland
- List of prisoners with whole-life tariffs
- List of serial killers in the United Kingdom
- Mental Deficiency Act 1913

== Cited works and further reading ==
- Adamson, Iain (1988) [1964]. A Man of Quality: A Biography of the Hon. Mr. Justice Cassels. Edgware Road, London: Frederick Muller Limited. ISBN 978-3-936-33735-8.
- Baker, Peter (1962). Time Out of Life. London: Windmill Books. ASIN B000YCOEIS.
- Blundell, Nigel (1996). The Encyclopedia of Serial Killers. London: Promotional Reprint Company Ltd. ISBN 978-1-856-48328-5.
- Buck, Paul (2012). Prison Break: True Stories of the World's Greatest Escapes. Sussex, England: John Blake Publishing. ISBN 978-1-857-82760-6.
- Butler, Ivan (1973). Murderers' England. London: Robert Hale Publishing. ISBN 978-0-7091-4054-2.
- Davis, Michael (2022). Bath Murders and Misdemeanours. Stroud: Amberley Publishing. ISBN 978-1-398-11135-6.
- Fido, Martin (1995). Chronicle of Twentieth Century Murder. London: Bracken Publishing. ISBN 978-1-858-91390-2.
- Frasier, David K. (1996). Murder Cases of the Twentieth Century: Biographies and Bibliographies of 280 Convicted or Accused Killers. McFarland & Co. ISBN 978-0-786-40184-0.
- Gaute, J. H. H.; Odell, Robin (1979). The Murderers' Who's Who: Outstanding International Cases from the Literature of Murder in the Last 150 Years. North Yorkshire: Methuen Publishing. ISBN 978-0-458-93900-8.
- Goodman, Johnathan (1983). The Pleasures of Murder. London: Allison & Busby. ISBN 978-0-850-31512-7.
- Gordon, R. Michael (2018). Murder Files from Scotland Yard and the Black Museum. Jefferson, North Carolina: McFarland & Company. ISBN 978-1-476-67254-0.
- Lane, Brian; Gregg, Wilfred (1992). The Encyclopedia of Serial Killers. London: Headline Publishing. ISBN 978-0-747-23731-0.
- Levi, Jonathan; French, Emma (2019). Inside Broadmoor: Up Close and Personal with Britain's Most Dangerous Criminals. London: Bonnier Books Limited. ISBN 978-1-788-70094-8.
- Morris, Jim (2015). The Who's Who of British Crime: In the Twentieth Century. Stroud: Amberley Publishing. ISBN 978-1-445-63924-6.
- Newton, Michael (2002). The Encyclopedia of Kidnappings. New York: Facts On File, Incorporated. ISBN 978-1-438-12988-4.
- Parker, R. J. (2002). Serial Killers Encyclopedia: The Encyclopedia of Serial Killers from A to Z. Toronto: RJ Parker Publishing, Incorporated. ISBN 978-0-671-02074-3.
- Richards, Cara (2000). The Loss of Innocents: Child Killers and Their Victims. Scholarly Resources. ISBN 978-0-520-28287-2
- Rowland, John (1965). Unfit to Plead? Four Studies in Criminal Responsibility. London: J. Long. ASIN B0000CMMVU. OCLC 743194930.
- Sanders, John (2008). Inside the Mind of the Sex Killer. London: True Crime Library. ISBN 978-1-874-35840-4.
- Schiff, Stanley A. (1993). Evidence in the Litigation Process. Toronto: Carswell. ISBN 978-0-459-55755-3.
- Sly, Nicola; Van der Kiste, John (2012). Somerset Murders. Cheltenham, Gloucestershire: History Press. ISBN 978-0-752-48431-0.
- Wilson, Colin (2000). The Mammoth Book of the History of Murder. Carroll & Graf Publishers. ISBN 978-0-786-70714-0.
- Wynn, Douglas (1996). On Trial for Murder. London: Pan Books. ISBN 978-0-09-472990-2.
- Weir, Nigel (2011). British Serial Killers. Milton Keynes: Author House UK. ISBN 978-1-467-88140-1.
- Wilkes, Roger (2011). The Mammoth Book of Famous Trials. London: Little, Brown Book Group. ISBN 978-1-780-33372-4.
- Williams, J. E.; Kirman, Brian H. (1955). The British Journal of Delinquency. Vol. 5. Oxford: Oxford University Press.
