= Roland Oliver (judge) =

English barrister and High Court judge

Sir Roland Oliver MC, KC
- Born: Roland Giffard Oliver; 5 May 1882
- Died: 14 March 1967 (aged 84)
- Education: Marlborough College
- Alma mater: Corpus Christi College, Oxford
- Occupations: barrister, judge

Sir Roland Giffard Oliver, MC (5 May 1882 – 14 March 1967) was an English barrister and High Court judge.

== Biography ==
=== Early life and legal career ===
Roland Oliver was the third son of Edmund Ward Oliver of Orlestone, Kent. He was educated at Marlborough College and Corpus Christi College, Oxford, where he obtained second-class honours in Jurisprudence. He was called to the Bar by the Inner Temple in 1909 and joined the South-Eastern Circuit. He was the pupil, and then the devil, of Travers Humphreys (later Mr Justice Humphreys) whose son, Christmas Humphreys, would later become Oliver's own pupil.

During the First World War, Oliver served with the Royal Field Artillery, and received the Military Cross. In 1921, he was appointed Third Junior Prosecuting Counsel for the Crown at the Central Criminal Court, and thereafter he took part in many notable criminal trials. These included the 1922 trial of Edith Thompson and Frederick Bywaters for murder, and the "Mr A." case, which arose out of the civil action Robinson v. Midland Bank.

In 1925, Oliver was appointed a King's Counsel and in 1934 he was elected a Bencher of the Inner Temple. Although his reputation was in criminal cases, after he took silk he began to be briefed in an increasing number of civil cases as well. In 1931, he unsuccessful defended William Herbert Wallace on a charge of murder, although the jury verdict was exceptionally quashed on appeal. In the 1933 "fire-rising" case, he led for the Crown in the prosecution of Leopold Harris, as well as the subsequent prosecution of Captain Brymore Eric Miles of the London Salvage Corps. In 1932, he appeared in the consistory court for the Bishop of Norwich in the action against the Rev. Harold Davidson, which led to his defrocking.

In 1938, Oliver successfully defended obstetric surgeon Aleck Bourne on a charge of abortion in the Rex v Bourne trial.

Oliver was Recorder of Folkestone from 1926 to 1938. In addition, he was a member of the 1936 inquiry into the leakage of the Budget, and chaired a committee on court martial procedure in 1938.

=== Judicial career ===
In 1938, Oliver was appointed to the High Court of Justice in succession to Mr Justice Horridge. He was knighted upon his appointment and was assigned to the King's Bench Division. In 1943, he chaired an inquiry into the conditions in naval and military prisons and detention barracks. In 1948, he tried Peter Griffiths for the murder of June Anne Devaney. In 1951, he tried John Straffen, who was found to be unfit to plead. He retired in 1957, after a final sitting at the Old Bailey.

=== Family ===
Oliver married Winifred Burnaby in 1923; she died in 1959. Oliver then married Madelaine Mary Kean in 1961; she died in 1974.

=== Assessment ===
His obituary in The Times described him as "an outstanding figure at the criminal law Bar". He was described as having a quiet manner and a soft voice, but also "a strong and forceful character".

== In popular culture ==
Oliver was portrayed by Edward Hammond in the 1980 Granada Television series Lady Killers.
