= Henry Elam =

British judge (1903–1993)

Henry Elam (29 November 1903 – 13 August 1993) was a British judge. He was at the trial of John Thomas Straffen, Neville Heath, Timothy Evans, John Christie, the Rex v Bourne trial, and the murder of Gay Gibson trial.
