= Six Point Group =

British feminist campaign group

The Six Point Group was a British feminist campaign group founded by Lady Rhondda in 1921 to press for changes in the law of the United Kingdom in six areas.

== Aims ==
The six original specific aims were:

1. Satisfactory legislation on child assault;
2. Satisfactory legislation for the widowed mother;
3. Satisfactory legislation for the unmarried mother and her child;
4. Equal rights of guardianship for married parents;
5. Equal pay for teachers
6. Equal opportunities for men and women in the civil service.

These later evolved into six general points of equality for women: political, occupational, moral, social, economic and legal.

== History ==
The group was founded by Lady Rhondda in 1921 to press for changes in the law of the United Kingdom in six areas. The secretary from 1921 to 1926 was the actor-director and ex-suffragette Winifred Mayo. Lady Rhondda was replaced as Chair by Flora Drummond in 1931.

It was inaugurated by several societies including: the British Commonwealth Union, British Federation of University Women, City Women's Club, Federation of Women Civil Servants, National Union of Trained Nurses, National Union of Women Teachers, Women's Auxiliary Service, Women's Guild of Empire, Women Sanitary Inspectors and Health Visitors Association.

During the 1920s, it was active in trying to have the League of Nations pass an Equal Rights Treaty. The group campaigned on principles of strict equality between men and women. This 'old feminism' or 'equality feminism' was sometimes contrasted to the 'new feminism' or 'welfare feminism' of other women's groups of the period, such as the National Union of Societies for Equal Citizenship, which sought protectionist legislation applying only to women.

Members included former militant suffragists - such as Dorothy Evans, Florence Macfarlane, Monica Whately, Helen Archdale, Charlotte Marsh, Theresa Garnett and Stella Newsome - as well as younger women like Winifred Holtby, Vera Brittain and Caroline Haslett. Though the membership was usually under 300, the Six Point Group wielded considerable political influence in the interwar years and during the Second World War. It campaigned by traditional constitutional methods. Much of its work was done through its journal, Time and Tide. It also made deputations to the appropriate government ministers, organised public rallies and wrote letters to major newspapers.

From 1933, along with the Open Door Council, it spearheaded the movement for the right of married women to work.

It was responsible for establishing the Income Tax Reform Council and in 1938, the Married Women's Association.

During the Second World War, the Six Point Group campaigned on a variety of issues. They protested about the fact that female volunteers in the Civil Defence Services received only two-thirds the men's pay. They objected that the compensation provided for by the Personal Injuries (Emergency Provisions) Act of 1939 was skewed between male / female recipients. They were closely involved in the Equal Compensation Campaign from 1941 to 1943 and subsequently had representatives alongside the Open Door Council and the Fawcett Society on the committee of the Equal Pay Campaign Committee from 1944 to ensure equal pay in the Civil Service.

The group continued to have significant political influence in the post war period. It took part in the protests to have the Matrimonial Proceedings and Property Act changed to give married women more financial protection. British suffragist, Sybil Morrison, was the organising secretary and chair of the group from approximately 1948-1950, a topic she discussed with the historian, Brian Harrison, as part of the Suffrage Interviews project, titled Oral evidence on the suffragette and suffragist movements: the Brian Harrison interviews. Hazel Hunkins Hallinan took over as chair in 1950s, having joined the organisation in 1922. She also discussed the group in a suffrage interview with Brian Harrison, including efforts to amalgamate the Six Point Group and the Married Women's Association, which were unsuccessful due to differences of opinion between Teresa Billington-Greig and Phyllis Vallance about constitutional and financial issues. She also reported that the Six Point Group was supported by Nancy Astor, who gave £5 every year, and by Frederick Pethwick-Lawrence, who helped to organise parties at the House of Lords.

From 1967, the group played an active part in the co-ordination of other women's groups on a number of issues. Its secretary in the 1970s was Hazel Hunkins Hallinan. From the late 1970s the group declined through its failure to recruit younger women. It went into abeyance in 1980, and was finally dissolved in 1983.

== Archives ==
The archives of the Six Point Group are held at The Women's Library which is based at the London School of Economics.
