= Farley Hall, Swallowfield =

Country house in Berkshire, England

Coordinates: 51.3757°N 0.9236°W

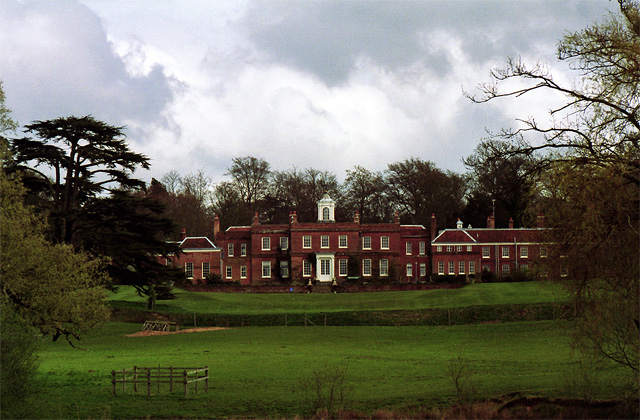
Farley Hall

Farley Hall is a large 18th-century Grade I listed country house in the English village of Farley Hill, in the civil parish of Swallowfield, Berkshire.

The Hall was built in 1720s for Charles Lannoy. Plans for the landscaping were drawn up by the landscape gardener Charles Bridgeman. Formal gardens covering over 50 acres (20 hectares) have now been largely lost to agricultural and commercial development.

The house stands in parkland on high ground overlooking a lake and is built in brick in two storeys to a rectangular plan. The centre and oldest part has seven bays and is connected on each side by two bay links to four bay pavilions.

The 1750 acre (700 hectare) estate is bordered on three sides by tributaries of the River Thames (the Whitewater, Blackwater and Loddon). Within the grounds is a traditional working farm, a livery facility, a dairy farm, a commercial partridge, pheasant and mixed bird shoot and a range of residential and commercial properties.

The livery yard opened in February 2010 and is run by Gavin Crossley, formerly of the Household Cavalry. The Farley Hall Horse Trials became a new fixture in the British Eventing calendar in 2014.

The estate is currently owned by the fifth Viscount Bearsted and his family. Lady Bearsted (Dr Caroline Sacks) runs a medical practice from the Hall.
