= Rex v Bourne =

1938 British court case on abortion

- Court: Old Bailey
- Decided: 19 July 1938
- Citation: [1939] 1 KB 687

Court membership
- Judge sitting: Sir Malcolm Macnaghten

Rex v Bourne, The King v Aleck Bourne, or the Bourne Judgment, was a British landmark court case in 1938 relating to an abortion performed by obstetric surgeon Aleck Bourne on a 14-year-old girl who had become pregnant as a result of being raped. The judge directed the jury towards the concept that situations arise where abortion might protect the health of the mother. Bourne was found not guilty of performing the procedure unlawfully and the judgment set the precedence for several subsequent abortion cases and the United Kingdom's Abortion Act of 1967.

Seeking a termination of her pregnancy in May 1938, the girl came to the attention of Bourne, who had been awaiting such a case to test in the courts. He admitted her to St Mary's Hospital in June, informed authorities of his intention to perform the operation, carried it out, and then asked to be arrested.

Charged under section 58 of the Offences Against the Person Act 1861 for procuring an abortion, it was decided that the case should go to trial at the Old Bailey before a judge and jury. With the term "unlawful" added to the charge, the trial took place on 18 and 19 July 1938. The prosecution was led by Donald Sumervell, while Bourne was defended by Mr G. A. Thesiger and Roland Oliver. In his direction, the judge Sir Malcolm Macnaghten, asked the jury to answer not the question of whether Bourne performed the operation in good faith to preserve the girl's life, but whether Bourne's actions were "not done in good faith for the purpose only of preserving the life of the girl." It took the jury 40 minutes to come to the verdict that Bourne was not guilty.

The trial received widespread interest from the public, medical professionals and legal establishments.

== Background ==
The Offences Against the Person Act 1861 made it illegal to perform an abortion. (Note: Section 58 stated possible life imprisonment for a person deliberately causing a miscarriage.) Between 1861 and 1938, some therapeutic indications for terminating a pregnancy were found in medical textbooks, though where that stood in law was unclear; the issue of what might be a lawful reason to perform an abortion had not been tested in court. By 1920, the procedure was generally safe when performed by trained professionals. However, prosecutions for conducting abortions were common, particularly of medically untrained women who carried out the unsafe procedure for a small fee.

Aleck Bourne was a reputable obstetrician at St Mary's Hospital, London, and visiting consultant at Queen Charlotte's Maternity Hospital, London, who pushed for reforms in abortion law, and performed the procedure without fee. Five years before the 1938 trial, Bourne had successfully stood by a Dr Avarne, who had been accused by pathologist Sir Bernard Spilsbury of performing an illegal abortion. The following year in 1934 he was appointed to the British Medical Association (BMA) Committee on the Medical Aspects of Abortion. Its report, published in 1936, included indications for performing an abortion for therapeutic reasons, one of which was for mental ill-health. It noted that an abortion might prevent psychological stress in an underage girl pregnant by rape. Subsequently, for the purpose of testing the issue in court, Bourne awaited such a case to come his way.

== Facts ==
On 27 April 1938, a 14-year-old girl had been raped by a group of Royal guardsmen at Horse Guards Parade near Whitehall and the assailants were subsequently sentenced at the Old Bailey. (Note: Two of the guards were found guilty at the Old Bailey on 28 June 1938. The judge was Justice du Parcq. The girl had stated that she was a clerkess and was lured by the offer to see a horse with a green tail.)

In May 1938, the girl attended St Thomas' Hospital, where after confirming that she was pregnant, was refused an abortion and was turned away. Through the Schools Care Committee, the girl came to the attention of Joan Malleson, a physician and member of the medico-legal counsel of the Abortion Law Reform Association (ALRA). Malleson in turn wrote to Bourne for assistance.

Bourne saw the girl and her mother on 31 May. She was admitted to St Mary's on 6 June. On 14 June, he openly performed a termination of pregnancy. He had informed the police of his intent prior to the procedure, and afterwards asked to be arrested. Subsequently he was charged under section 58 of the Offences Against the Person Act 1861.

== Marylebone Police Court ==
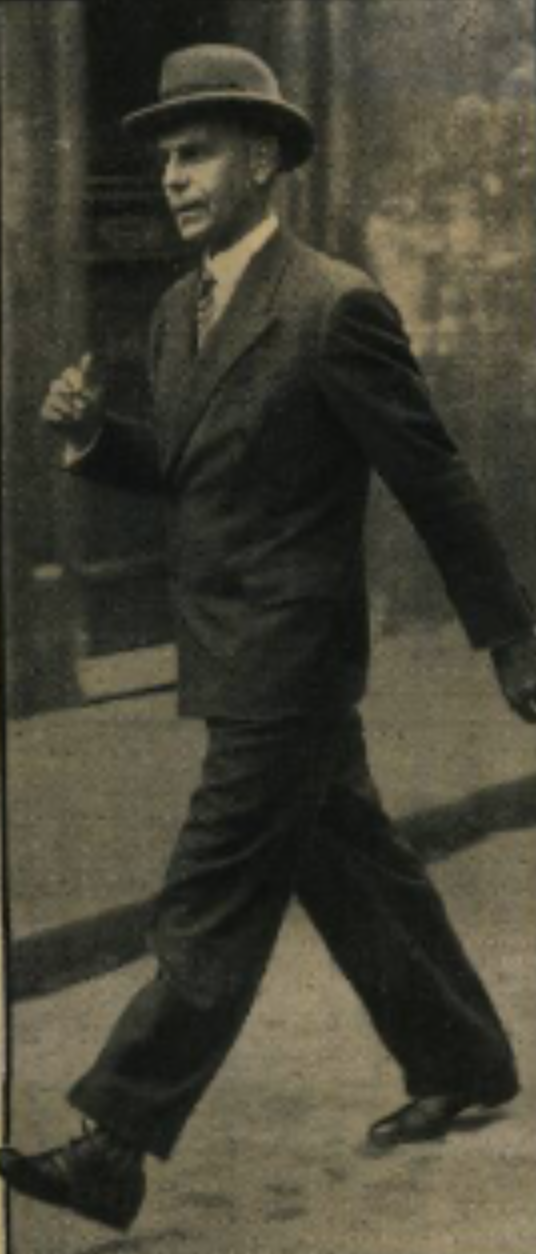
Bourne leaving Marylebone Police Court (1 July 1938)

On 1 July, Bourne was called to Marylebone Police Court, where in front of magistrate Mr Ivan E. Snell, Mr G. A. Thesiger of the London and Counties Medical Protection Society took to his defence. The Director of Public Prosecutions was represented by H. A. K. Morgan.

=== Prosecution ===
Morgan noted the case to be far from usual in that a well respected surgeon openly broke the law for reasons he thought good, and in so doing risked his own life imprisonment. On finding an underage girl pregnant by rape, Bourne had found his perfect case. Morgan clarified that on missing her period the girl was taken to Malleson. Malleson requested advice from Bourne, who in turn replied "I shall be delighted to take her in at St Mary's and curette her ... I will write to the attorney general and invite him to take action". After seeing the girl and receiving a letter of consent from her father, Bourne informed Dr P. C. F. Wingate, his resident obstetric officer, about the case. At admission, a pregnancy test was positive and she was observed until the eighth day when Bourne noted her to have a nervous breakdown. It was then that Bourne confirmed to go ahead with the procedure to "empty her uterus", and this was carried out on 14 June. Later that day, when Chief Inspector Bridger went to interview him, Bourne responded by saying "I want you to arrest me."

The girl's name was not revealed in court and Morgan assured the court that she would face no charges herself. Her father confirmed that he gave written consent to Bourne on 31 May, but asked to keep it a private matter. Malleson confirmed she knew Bourne in a professional manner and that she received two letters from him in response to hers. Also cautioned was Wingate. He confirmed the story, adding that he attended the abortion on 14 June, which was carried out under aseptic conditions and that she had been looked after by qualified medical staff.

=== Defence ===
Thesiger advised Bourne to plead "not guilty". He informed the court of how the law stood on the matter of abortion, and reiterated the crime against the girl; one man had sexual intercourse with her while the other held her down. Thesiger clarified that the girl and her parents consented to the abortion, the surgeon was highly qualified and the conditions for the procedure was as safe as could be. He argued that Bourne attempted to avert the consequences of a wrong doing and could not possibly be unlawful in his actions. He pointed out that the 1861 Act mentioned the word "unlawful" four times, an unnecessary entry unless the law intended that there may be situations where the procedure would not be "unlawful". He called for the case to be dismissed.

=== Magistrate's decision ===
The conclusion was that Bourne was to pay £100 in bail and go to trial at the Central Criminal Court before a judge and jury. Snell pointed out that this decision was likely agreeable with Bourne himself.

== Proceedings in the Old Bailey ==
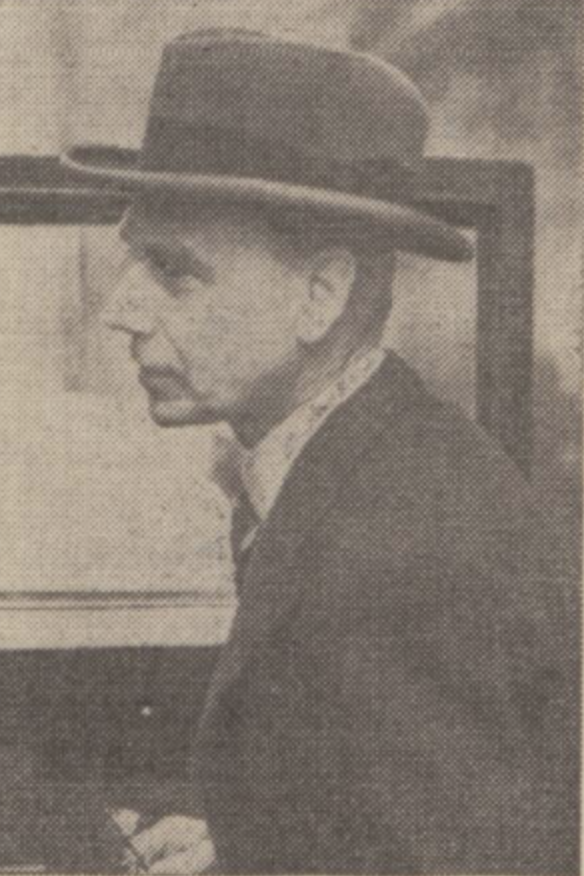
Aleck Bourne on his way to the Old Bailey 19 July 1938

Bourne was "charged under the Offences against the Person Act 1861, s. 58, that he unlawfully procured the abortion of a girl aged about 15 years". (Note: The word "unlawful" was added to the indictment at the request of Oliver.) The trial took place at the Old Bailey on 18 and 19 July 1938.

Two women and 10 men made up the jury. The judge was Sir Malcolm Macnaghten. Attorney General Donald Sumervell, L. A. Byrne and Henry Elam represented the prosecution, while Bourne was defended by Thesiger and Roland Oliver.

Oliver began with explaining that the case depended on the meaning of "unlawful" and with agreement of the judge and prosecution, asked that if any members of the jury had strong opinions that all abortions were unlawful then they should step down; none did.

=== Prosecution ===
Malleson wrote to Bourne explaining that the consultant at St Thomas’s had refused to perform a termination, commenting "I think from the report of his attitude [he] must be Catholic. He took the conventional standpoint that 'he would not interfere with life because the child may be the future Prime Minister of England,' and 'that anyhow, girls will always lead men on.'" This is sometimes garbled by claims the St Thomas consultant said " the rapists were officers and therefore apparently gentlemen". The rapists were troopers, not officers.

Bourne admitted that his experience of seeing the dangers of underage girls going through pregnancy did bias his opinion in this case, though it was performed in what was the agreed safest conditions at that time. He felt that though he felt certain himself of what was meant by "therapeutic", he acknowledged that fears among his colleagues of performing abortions for therapeutic reasons resulted in many women resorting to dangerous backstreet procedures. His intent was to observe her over a period of time. Bourne noted that the girl was "not mentally defective" and "not of the prostitute type". Unable to differentiate between danger to life and danger to health, Bourne felt abortion was justified to protect both her physical and mental health. Bourne clarified that he performed the operation to save health and preserve life, not to save life.

=== Defence ===
Witnesses included Lord Horder. He agreed with Bourne. William Gilliatt, an eminent gynaecologist assured the court of Bourne's competence in both deciding on a suitable case and performing the operation, and if put in similar situation he would have done the same.

In the evidence of police surgeon, Jacob A. Gorsky, his examination findings from 27 April found the girl distressed with physical signs consistent with "violence and rape". The opinion of psychiatrist, J. R. Rees, was that the state of the mind was intertwined with the physical state, and if asked if he would advise abortion in this girl's case, he said he would certainly agree on the grounds of the severity of the sexual assault and her young age. The outcome of leaving her as she was would be similar to that of shell shock, he told the court.

=== Direction and verdict ===
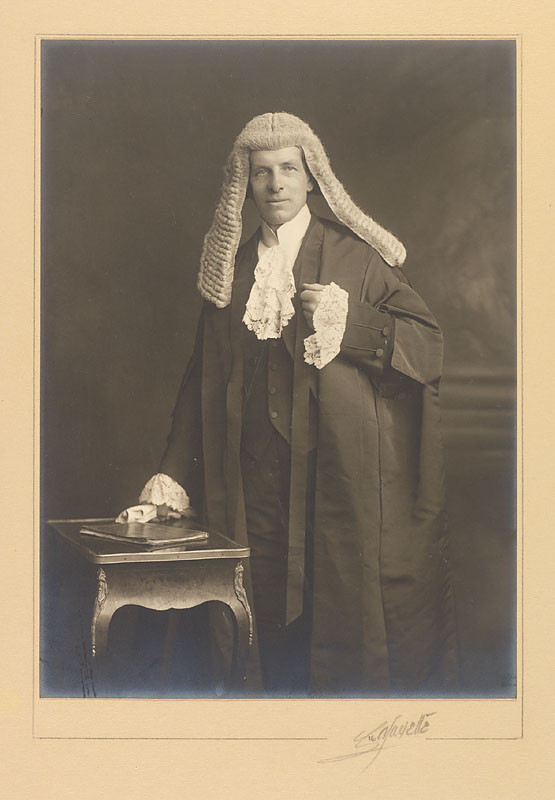
Judge Sir Malcolm Macnaghten

If the doctor is of the opinion, on reasonable grounds and with adequate knowledge, that the probable consequence of the continuance of the pregnancy will be to make the woman a physical or mental wreck, the jury are entitled to take the view that the doctor is operating for the purpose of preserving the life of the mother...Macnaghten

Macnaghten asked the jury to answer not the question of whether Bourne performed the operation in good faith to preserve the girl's life, but whether Bourne's actions were "not done in good faith for the purpose only of preserving the life of the girl." He stated that performing an abortion might protect the health of the mother by preventing a "physical or mental wreck".

Macnaghten drew upon the wording of the Infant Life (Preservation) Act 1929 and whether the procedure is "done in good faith for the purpose of preserving the life of the mother". He recommended that the jury be prejudiced by the testimonies of Gorsky and Rees, and consider the girl's age, dangers of delivering a baby before physical maturity, and mental effect of the crime of rape of a child. He reminded them that this case involved a girl not of "the prostitute class". He used the analogy of not immediately operating on a child with appendicitis to save life, contrast to be watchful waiting and operating with risk of death once the appendix perforates. "Do it, and do it now. Do it while it is still safe to do it. Do not wait to see whether she is near death." "The unborn child in the womb must not be destroyed unless the destruction of that child is for the purpose of preserving the yet more precious life of the mother", he said.

It took the jury 40 minutes to come to the verdict of "Not Guilty".

== Response ==
Dubbed "the case of the horse with a green tail", the assault on the girl in April 1938 received widespread media coverage in England. Subsequently, the trial relating to the abortion received extensive interest from the public, medical professionals and legal establishments. On hearing the verdict, members at a BMA conference cheered at the news.

The judgment gave physicians the authority to decide on the eligibility of a woman requesting an abortion. However, illegal backstreet abortions continued for most seeking a termination of pregnancy unless a safer private clinic could be afforded. The case had come to be known as the "Bourne Judgment" and set the precedence in several subsequent abortion cases.

In 1945, Bourne resigned from the ALRA and, twenty years later, co-founded the Society for the Protection of Unborn Children. To Bourne's disappointment the case was used in the construction of the Abortion Act of 1967, which he criticized for being lax, saying that "I would not have it believed that I have worked for a loose interpretation of the law", and in his opinion would result in "the greatest holocaust in history". The Abortion Act 1967 recognised abortion as legal if two registered medical practitioners agreed that "the continuance of the pregnancy would involve risk to the life of the pregnant woman, or of injury to the physical or mental health of the pregnant woman, or any existing children of her family". (Note: By the mid-1960s unsafe abortion was the leading cause of avoidable maternal deaths.)

== See also ==
- R v Davidson
