= Jacob Arthur Gorsky =

British physician and coroner (1896-1961)

Jacob A. Gorsky (1896 – 22 December 1961) was a British Medical Association council member and deputy coroner for East London and later West Middlesex. On 27 April 1938 he examined the victim in the Rex v Bourne trial.

Gorsky married Doreen Stephens in 1942. He died in Australia on 22 December 1961.
