= Nancy Stewart Parnell =

British politician and trade unionist

Nancy Stewart Parnell (14 May 1901 – 1975) was a British Liberal politician and trade unionist who was President of the National Union of Women Teachers.

== Background ==
Parnell was born in London, a daughter of Bertram Damer Parnell and Madeleine Byrne. She was a great-niece of Charles Stewart Parnell. She grew up in Liverpool, where she attended the Notre Dame High School, and then the University of Liverpool, where she received a scholarship. While at the university, she became active in support of the League of Nations. She also joined the Catholic Women's Suffrage Society and spoke in support of votes for women under the age of thirty. From 1918 to 1929 only women over 30 had the vote. She served as secretary of Liverpool Students' Union in 1921/22.

== Career ==
After university, Parnell became a school teacher, teaching at a Liverpool convent. She joined the National Union of Women Teachers, serving as its president in 1936. In 1935 at a meeting in Leeds, she pointed out that women were being appointed ahead of men because they were cheaper: “Men ought to realise that they were the losers because of inequality of pay.” She was active in the Liberal Party and stood as its candidate in Willesden East at the 1935 United Kingdom general election, although she took only 7.3% of the vote and a distant third place.

Much of Parnell's time was devoted to the London Region Federation of the League of Nations Union and in 1936 she became its assistant organiser. She later became London Regional Officer of its successor, the United Nations Association, retiring in 1960.

In 1961 her book 'A Venture in Faith' was published. It was a history of St. Joan's Social and Political Alliance 1911-1961, formerly known as the Catholic Women's Suffrage Society.
