= Equal Pay Campaign Committee =

UK women's equality organization

- Formation: 1941
- Dissolved: 1956
- Headquarters: 35 Marsham Street, Westminster, London.
- Chair: Mavis Tate

The Equal Pay Campaign Committee (1941–1956) (EPCC) was a UK women's organisation, formed to redress the issue of unequal pay for women. As the fight for Women's suffrage in the United Kingdom was being won, a number of women's organisations in the 1920s began to lobby for equal pay for women. The Depression had resulted in women workers often being blamed for unemployment amongst men and many trade unions became openly hostile to improving women's pay.

== Precursor ==
The Second World War saw the 1941 Personal Injuries (Civilians) Scheme perpetuate gender inequality; women unable to work due to wartime injuries were offered less compensation than men, reflecting their lower rates of pay. The Scheme was opposed by women's organisations and action was co-ordinated by the National Association of Women Civil Servants and the British Federation of Business & Professional Women.

To co-ordinate their oppositionthe 'Equal Compensation for War Injury for Men and Women Campaign Committee' was created. Chaired by Mavis Tate, the Committee had representatives from the Women Power Committee, The National Association of Women Civil Servants, the British Federation of Business & Professional Women (BFBPW), the National Council of Women of Great Britain, the Women's Publicity Planning Association and later the Women's Freedom League. Their efforts led to a government select committee being created, which overturned the existing legislation and resulted in equal compensation rates being paid from 1943.

=== Creation of the Committee ===
The logical development from this significant achievement was to tackle the larger issue of equal pay for women. A new committee was created under the title of the Equal Pay Campaign Committee, with a sister branch in Scotland and an attached advisory council. Mavis Tate was appointed Chair, a post she held until Thelma Cazalet-Keir became Chair 1947-1957. Both women, together with prominent supporter Irene Ward, were Conservative Members of Parliament. Yet both the Conservative Party and the Labour Party were united in their reluctance to support equal pay for women.

Women's organisations offered practical support: the Joint Committee on Women in the Civil Service advised Tate, whilst accommodation was provided by the National Association of Women Civil Servants. The British Federation of Business & Professional Women gave financial support. The involvement of the female politicians helped the Equal Pay Campaign Committee initiate parliamentary debates very quickly after its creation.

=== Royal Commission ===
A Royal Commission on Equal Pay was established and a report was quickly published in October 1946. This recommended that equal pay might benefit women in teaching and selected civil service grades. The Trades Union Congress proposed that the Government should extend implementation of the recommendations to Government industrial establishments - in order to influence the pay negotiations in the private sector.

The Equal Pay Campaign Committee publicised the report's findings in 1946 and 1947, through publicity and public meetings. With the Status of Women Committee a meeting was held in the Public Hall at Westminster, whilst Nina Popplewell organised a national campaign.

An Advisory Committee was created which included members with political aims, unlike the main committee. This enabled an invite to be extended to the Fabian Society and the Women's Communist Party, although the latter declined. Activities reached a peak during 1948-1949 with publications and a newsletter being created to increase publicity.

=== 'To Be A Woman' film ===
The British Federation of Business & Professional Women paid for an Equal Pay Campaign Committee film made by Jill Craigie. Her film, `To Be A Woman', first screened in 1951 and illustrates the skill of the Committee to generate publicity.

=== Petition to Parliament ===
On 9 March 1954 an 'Equal Pay in the public services' petition was submitted to Parliament. Two similar petitions combined to create a joint demand with over 80,000 signatories and demonstrated cross party unity from the female politicians. The first page was signed by Irene Ward, Muriel Pierotti, Ethel Watts, Philippa Strachey and Horton. The petition was presented by four politicians - Ulster Unionist Party's Patricia Ford, Conservative Party's Irene Ward and Labour Party's Edith Summerskill and Barbara Castle. The four politicians arrived together in a horse drawn carriage decorated in suffragette colours. The petition had been sparked in 1951 by the Labour Chancellor Hugh Gaitskell's claim - in the House of Commons chamber - that equal pay for women would drive up prices.

=== Teachers and nurses ===
Between 1918-1987 the Burnham committee was responsible for setting teachers' pay in the UK. The National Union of Women Teachers were active in the Equal Pay Campaign Committee and took advice from fellow members. In 1954 the Equal Pay Campaign Committee approached the local authority representatives on the Burnham Committee, widening the push for equal pay across public services to women teachers.

This approach was also used to influence the Whitley Councils to adopt the principal of equal pay for men and women. One of these Councils negotiated pay for nurses and midwives. The Royal College of Nursing (RCN) represented a significant proportion of the female nurses on the Council. In 1948 there were just under 150,000 nurses and midwives employed in the National Health Service in England and Wales. However there was a severe shortage of nurses post War with some 30,000 vacancies in 1945 rising to 54,00 by 1948. Pay was a critical factor to retention and recruitment, so the RCN became an active member of the Equal Pay Campaign Committee to improve pay for its members. This included responding to superannuation proposals for nurses and other officers under the National Health Service Act 1946. The RCN was not just concerned about NHS nurses who at this time predominantly worked in hospitals. They drew up a recommended national salary scale for public health nurses and the rapidly growing number of industrial nurses. The scales were dependent on qualifications and experience, again taking the advice of other Equal Pay Campaign members on board.

=== Closure ===
In February 1956 the Equal Pay Campaign Committee disbanded having achieved agreement to the introduction, in stages, of equal pay in the public sector.

A statement in The Times in March 1956 reported that "Mrs. Thelma Cazalet-Keir, said that in view of the Government's decision to implement equal pay in the Civil Service by seven stages, and the corresponding decisions of the Burnham Committee and other bodies, " the committee and council believe that the further necessary work to implement full equal pay is best undertaken by the individual organizations in their own spheres.""

Although the Committee had achieved significant success by 1956, it was not until 1970 that legislation for Equal Pay was introduced by Barbara Castle as the Equal Pay Act. This required strengthening with the introduction of the Sex Discrimination Act in 1975, and subsequent Equality Acts. There remains a Gender pay gap in the United Kingdom.

== Organisations represented on the committee ==
By 1956 there were some 50 organisations involved in the committee. These included:

- Actresses' Franchise League (AFL).
- British Federation of Business & Professional Women (BFBPW)
- Fawcett Society
- Joint Committee on Women in the Civil Service
- National Association of Women Civil servants
- National Union of Women Teachers (NUWT)
- National Council of Women of Great Britain (NCW)
- Open Door Council
- Royal College of Nursing (RCN)
- Six Point Group
- Women's Freedom League (WFL)
- Status of Women Committee (1935–1985) chaired by Thelma Cazalet-Keir.
- Women's Adjustment Board formed by the AFL during the Second World War to help find employment for women during wartime.
- Women Power Committee This had been formed to promote the interests of British women during the Second World War, after discussions between Nancy Astor, Viscountess Astor and Caroline Haslett the President of the BFBPW.
- Women's Publicity Planning Association

== Notable committee members and supporters ==
- Dorothy Evans was a member of the predecessor Equal Compensation Campaign 1941-1943, and then from 1944 a committee member for the National Association of Women Civil Servants
- Thelma Cazalet-Keir Chair 1947-1957.
- Gertrude Horton Secretary from 1951.
- Muriel Pierotti Vice Chair 1940s-1950s for the NUWT.
- Nina Popplewell Secretary from 1947.
- Marian Reeves active member.
- Mavis Tate was Chair 1942-1947
- Irene Ward active member.
- Ethel Watts Treasurer n.d., for the Fawcett Society.
- Monica Whately active member
