= Gordon Froud =

South African artist and curator (born 1963)

- Born: 1963 (age 61–62); Johannesburg, South Africa
- Awards: 1988 Merit Award for Sculpture – New Signatures Competition. 1995 2nd prize Kempton Park Art Competition. 1995 Merit award - Volkskas Atelier Competition. 1996 – 3rd Prize – Kempton Park Art Competition. 1996 – Merit Award – PPC Cement Sculpture Competition. 1997 – Ampersand Foundation Fellowship to spend 3 months in New York. Absa Gold Medal for contribution to the arts 2005.

Gordon Froud (born 1963 in Johannesburg) is a South African artist and curator. Froud's work has been showcased in hundreds of exhibitions throughout South Africa and the world, and he has served as a judge for several national art competitions. He has been the recipient of numerous awards including a Merit Award for Sculpture in the 1988 New Signatures Competition and an ABSA Gold Medal for contribution to the arts in 2005. Froud has also spent many years working as an art educator at both the secondary and tertiary level in London and South Africa. Perhaps known best for his use of found and untraditional materials in his sculptures, Froud attempts to explore the human condition in his work, particularly with regard to DNA, babies, genetics, bacteria, viruses and self-portraits. He currently balances his art practice and curation with running his own Gordart Gallery, which focuses on developing previously little-known artists.

== Career ==
=== Education ===
Froud graduated from the University of Witwatersrand in 1987 with BA (FA) Honours and a Higher Education Diploma. In 2007, he completed a Master of Technology degree at the University of Johannesburg.

=== Collections ===
- ABSA Bank Collection
- Pretoria Art Museum
- UNISA Art Gallery
- Sandton Civic Gallery
- Carfax Experience - Johannesburg
- South African Association of Arts
- Cite des Arts International – Paris
- South African Broadcasting Corporation - Johannesburg
- Alliance Francaise - Johannesburg
- Department of Science and Technology CSIR - Pretoria
- Mocambique Museum of Art – Maputo.
- Willow Ridge High School – Pretoria
- Steel Company – Cape Town
- SA High Commission - Maseru
- Li – Bel Restaurant – Pretoria
- La Pentola Restaurant – Pretoria
- Moses Mabilah Stadium – Durban
- North-West University – Potchefstroom
