= George Loutrell Timanus =

American physician

George Loutrell Timanu
- Born: January 31, 1892
- Died: June 1981 (aged 88–89)
- Occupation: Physician
- Medical career
- Field: Abortion

George Loutrell Timanus (January 31, 1892 – June 1981) was a physician who performed illegal abortions in the Baltimore and Washington, D.C. area from 1920 to 1951.

He graduated from Baltimore City College in 1910 and earned his M.D. at the University of Maryland in 1914.

Timanus and one other abortion provider performed an estimated 90% criminal abortions in Baltimore.

In 1950, Timanus used his criminal trial to challenge the abortion laws in the United States, as Aleck Bourne had done in the UK. However, his trial and that of another doctor, Edgar Keemer, were not understood as challenges by the public, and Timanus and Keemer did not recruit other doctors or patients to their cause in a way that might have built a movement or sparked national conversation. He was fined $5,000, sentenced to six months in jail, and barred from further practice of medicine.

Timanus participated in the Planned Parenthood Conference on Abortion in America in 1955. He gave a detailed breakdown of his patients, of whom he kept meticulous records, noting that of 5,200 women on whom he had performed abortions, only two had died. As Garrett Hardin noted, this 0.04% rate, in the days before antibiotics, was not only far lower than the mortality rate for women carrying to term at the time, but still only half the maternal mortality rate a generation later. At the conference, Timanus also lamented that of the 353 doctors who referred patients to him—some of them, Timanus claimed, with letters recommending abortion—none stood up to testify for him when he was arrested.

Timanus asked referring doctors to make a written statement that the abortion was necessary because her life would otherwise be jeopardized.

The breakdown of Timanus' patients was as follows:

- Age 12 - 15: 17
- Age 16 - 20: 688
- Age 21 - 25: 1,834
- Age 26 - 30: 1,268
- Age 31 - 40: 1,312
- Age 41+: 91
- Single: 1,830
- Married: 2,773
- Widowed/Divorced/Separated: 607
- Physicians: 7
- Wives of physicians: 58
- Nurses: 270

Mary Calderone, then medical director of Planned Parenthood Federation of America, noted that Timanus "certainly seemed to be very competent and professional."

Timanus was born in Baltimore, a son of George E. and Nettie Mae (Zimmermam) Timanus. His grandfather Luther Timanus was a judge on the Baltimore County Court.
