= Married Women's Association =

The Married Women's Association (MWA) was a British women's organisation founded by Edith Summerskill and Juanita Frances in 1938. It was the first UK twentieth century pressure group to focus on the rights of housewives via the goal of legal and economic equality for spouses, and the consideration of undervalued childcare and work done in the home with its resultant financial consequences for women after divorce. The organisation's previously unexplored influence on the course of family law, especially on the Married Women's Property Act of 1964, a landmark in the timeline of women's equality, is now recognised.

== History and legacy ==
A married woman in the UK in the early twentieth century did have the right to vote but did not have property rights in the matrimonial home, nor any right to savings made from housekeeping monies given to her by her husband. Attempts had been made by the Equal Rights International Group (ERIG) for an Equal Rights Treaty to be incorporated within the ERIG constitution of the League of Nations. The attempts failed. Juanita Frances then set up the non-party and non-sectarian MWA.

Summerskill became the association's first president. Later presidents included Vera Brittain and Juanita Frances. Its original aims were to promote financial equality between husband and wife, to give mothers and children a legal right to a share in the family home, to secure equal guardianship rights for both parents, and to extend the National Insurance Act to give equal provision for women. Later on, other objectives were added such as equal pay and the extension of family allowances.

The association held public meetings, debates, social activities, lobbied members of parliament and published the newsletters Wife and Citizen from 1945 to 1951 and The Married Women's Association Newsletter from 1966 to 1987. Prominent members included Vera Brittain, Juanita Frances, Doreen Gorsky, Helena Normanton, Hazel Hunkins Hallinan and Lady Helen Nutting.

The quietly persistent tactics used by the MWA, that gradually changed the conversation around, for example, property holdings within marriage, and which were used in the face of press and public derision and ridicule, are being considered see if lessons may be learned by current activists.

In 1952 Helena Normanton's evidence to the Royal Commission on Marriage and Divorce precipitated a split in the association as some members of the MWA felt that the evidence only related to privileged women. The split led to the establishment of the Council of Married Women.

The MWA papers are held at the Women's Library. A history of the MWA, drawing on extensive archival and empirical research, and treating the tactics and personalities involved in the association was published in 2022.
