= Open Door Council =

The Open Door Council, established in May 1926, was a British organisation pressing for equal economic opportunities for women. It opposed the extension of 'protective legislation' for women, regarding such legislation as 'restrictive' and arguing that it effectively barred women from better-paid jobs such as mining. In 1929 an international version was established, Open Door International, with Chrystal Macmillan serving as president until her death in 1937.

The Open Door Council was established by Lady Rhondda of the Six Point Group, Elizabeth Abbott of NUSEC, Sarah Clegg (died 1931) of the London Society for Women's Service, Emmeline Pethick-Lawrence of the Women's Freedom League and Virginia Crawford of the St Joan's Social and Political Alliance. Membership of the Open Door Council overlapped considerably with that of the Six Point Group. Margery Corbett Ashby spoke briefly about The Open Door Council in an interview with the historian Brian Harrison, in September 1976, as part of the Suffrage Interviews project, titled Oral evidence on the suffragette and suffragist movements: the Brian Harrison interviews.

The Open Door Council had representatives that sat on other committees, such as the Equal Pay Campaign Committee

The organisation continued until 1965.

Papers relating to the Open Door Council are held at the Women's Library.
