= Aleck Bourne =

British gynecologist and writer

Aleck William Bourne (4 June 1886 – 30 December 1974) was a prominent British gynaecologist and writer, known for his 1938 trial, a landmark case, in which he asked to be arrested for performing a termination of pregnancy on a 14-year-old rape victim. He was subsequently charged with procuring an illegal abortion but was acquitted. He later became an anti-abortion activist.

== Early life and career ==
Born in 1886, the only son of W. C. Bourne in Barnet, Bourne was educated at Rydal School and at Downing College, Cambridge where, in 1908, he received a first class in the Natural Science Tripos. Granted a senior university scholarship, he entered St Mary's Hospital in 1908 and he qualified as an MRCS, LRCP in 1910. He obtained an MB, BCh, (Cambridge), and a FRCS (England) the following year). From 1910 to 1914 he was a resident and subsequently held other appointments at St Mary's, Queen Charlotte's, and the Samaritan hospitals. In 1912, he married Bessie Hayward, the eldest daughter of G. W. Hayward, with whom he had three daughters.

While at Queen Charlotte's, in co-operation with professor J. H. Burn, he published research papers on uterine action in labour and in response to various drugs. During the First World War from 1914 to 1917 Bourne enlisted in the British Army and served as a surgical specialist with the 17th General Hospital in Egypt and the 2nd General Hospital in France. After the war, he built a successful consulting practice in obstetrics and gynaecology. In 1929, he was elected a foundation member of the Royal College of Obstetricians and Gynaecologists and, founding its museum in 1938, served as curator of its museum which he built up considerably during the following years. In 1934 he was appointed as Consulting Obstetrical surgeon at St Mary's Hospital.

A yachting and deep sea cruising enthusiast, he was a member of several yacht clubs during the 1930s and, in 1933, won the Royal Corinthian Yacht Club's cup for the best cruiser of the year.

== Abortion case ==
On 14 June 1938, Bourne was arrested after performing an operation without fee at St Mary's Hospital to terminate the pregnancy of six weeks of a 14-year-old girl who had been sexually assaulted by five off-duty British soldiers, guardsmen in the Royal Horse Guards, in a London barracks. She had first attended St. Thomas' Hospital, but was sent away by one doctor, who thought that "she might be carrying a future prime minister" and "that anyhow girls always lead men on." Tried at the Central Criminal Court in July 1938, Bourne was acquitted on charges of procuring abortion. His actions were later commended by The Lancet as "an example of disinterested conduct in consonance with the highest traditions of the profession".

His defence had been based on the Infant Life (Preservation) Act 1929 in which, under British law, the only recognised justification for the termination of a pregnancy was if the life of the woman was in danger. His defence was that although there was no direct danger to her life, termination of the pregnancy was justified because of the risks to her physical and mental health. He told the court that he could not "draw a line between danger to life and danger to health; if one waited for danger to life the woman would be past assistance". If the court recognised this to be a legitimate risk then it would fall under the exceptions to abortions of the Infant life (preservation) act, which they did.

== Later career and retirement ==
Serving as president of the Obstetrical and Gynaecological Section of the Royal Society of Medicine from 1938 to 1939, Bourne later wrote several important books including A Synopsis of Midwifery and Gynaecology, Recent Advances in Obstetrics and Gynecology with Leslie Williams and was the co-editor of British Obstetric and Gynaecological Practice with Sir Eardley Holland. An advocate of state medicine, Bourne expressed his views in Health of the Future (1942), which drew much attention to the issue in the medical field. After World War II, Bourne championed the admission of women students to St Mary's. He would continue serving as consulting gynaecologist at St Mary's Hospital and to the Samaritan Hospital for Women as well as consulting obstetric surgeon to Queen Charlotte's Hospital before his eventual retirement in 1951. In 1966, Bourne became a founding member of the Society for the Protection of Unborn Children which was organised in opposition to the Abortion Act, 1967 and campaigned actively, albeit unsuccessfully against the Act. In his memoirs, Bourne wrote:

Those who plead for an extensive relaxation of the law [against abortion] have no idea of the very many cases where a woman who, during the first three months, makes a most impassioned appeal for her pregnancy to be 'finished,' later, when the baby is born, is thankful indeed that it was not killed while still an embryo. During my long years in practice I have had many a letter of the deepest gratitude for refusing to accede to an early appeal.

In 1972, Bourne was made honorary fellow of the Royal Society of Medicine.

His retirement was active; he continued to undertake private practice alongside his interests in gardening, reading, travelling, and writing. He died on 27 December 1974, aged 88.

== Publications ==
- Recent Advances in Obstetrics and Gynæcology, 12th edition, 1962.
- Synopsis of Midwifery and Gynæcology, 13th edition, 1965.
- A Doctor's Creed, 1962 (Joint Editor).
- British Practice of Obstetrics and Gynæcology, 3rd edition, 1963.

== See also ==
- George Lotrell Timanus
