= Monica Whately =

British suffragist and political activist

(Mary) Monica Whately (30 November 1889 – 12 September 1960) was a British suffragist and political activist.

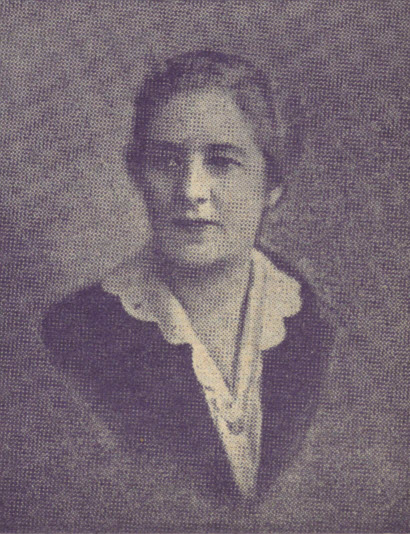
Monica Whately in French magazine Les femmes dans l'action mondiale dated 1 October 1934.

== Life ==
Born in the Brompton area of London, Whately studied at the London School of Economics. In 1912, she and her mother, Maude, were founder members of the Catholic Women's Suffrage Society. In 1918, this became the St Joan's Social and Political Union, and Whately was appointed as its secretary. In 1921, she was a founder of the Six Point Group, which campaigned for women's rights, and was also active in the National Union of Societies for Equal Citizenship and the Open Door Society.

Whately joined the Independent Labour Party (ILP), and through it became the Labour Party candidate for St Albans at the 1929 and 1931 general elections. She remained with the Labour Party after the ILP disaffiliated, and stood unsuccessfully in Clapham at the 1935 general election, before winning election to London County Council in 1937, representing Limehouse. While on the council, she successfully lobbied for midwives to continue in employment after marriage.

Whately was prominent in the No More War Movement between the wars. During World War II, she worked for the Ministry of Labour and Ministry of Information, but increasingly devoted her time to Save the Children. Whately was also part of the India League delegation sent to India to document aspects of colonial rule. These findings were later published in The Condition of India.

After the war, she campaigned against apartheid in South Africa and against the British government's brutal repression of the Mau Mau Uprising in Kenya. She also became an active member of the Equal Pay Campaign Committee (1941-1956).

An active member of the Society for Cultural Relations with the USSR from its formation in 1924, Whately visited the Soviet Union in 1950 and later visited Czechoslovakia, Poland, and China.
