= Harry Froud =

Australian rules footballer

Personal information
- Full name: Henry Thomas Ashton Froud
- Born: 16 November 1898; South Melbourne, Victoria
- Died: 7 February 1951 (aged 52); Fitzroy, Victoria

Playing career^{1}
Years	Club	Games (Goals)
1919	South Melbourne	10 (4)
- ^{1} Playing statistics correct to the end of 1919.

Henry Thomas Ashton Froud (16 November 1898 – 7 February 1951) was an Australian rules footballer who played with South Melbourne in the Victorian Football League (VFL).
