= Farley Hill, Berkshire =

Village in Berkshire, England

Coordinates: 51.37459°N 0.92099°W

Farley Hill
- Location within Berkshire
- OS grid reference: SU752645
- Civil parish: Swallowfield
- Unitary authority: Wokingham
- Ceremonial county: Berkshire
- Region: South East
- Country: England
- Sovereign state: United Kingdom
- Post town: Reading
- Postcode district: RG7
- Police: Thames Valley
- Fire: Royal Berkshire
- Ambulance: South Central

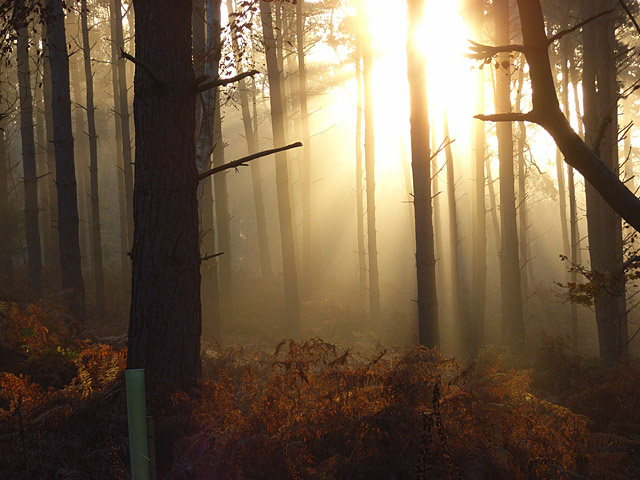
Woodland near Farley Hill, November 2007

Farley Hill is a village in the county of Berkshire, England. For local government purposes, the village is within the civil parish of Swallowfield, which in turn is within the unitary authority of Wokingham.

== Notable buildings ==
The village has three country houses: Farley Court, Farley Hall and Farley Castle.

The red brick church of St John the Evangelist, Farley Hill, was designed by George Truefitt and built in 1890-92. It closed at the end of 2012 after draft closure scheme was set in motion by the Church Commissioners. After a community use for the church could not be found, it was sold and converted to become private housing in 2016.

== Amenities ==
Farley Hill has a King George's Field in memorial to King George V. Farley Hill also has a village hall, The Victory Hall, donated to the inhabitants in 1919 by William Bishop of Farley Court.
