= Doreen Gorsky =

British Liberal Party politician, feminist and television producer and executive

Doreen Marjorie Gorsky
- Doreen Stephens
- Born: Doreen Stephens; 12 October 1912; Hammersmith, West London, England
- Died: 20 March 2001 (aged 88)
- Occupations: Politician, feminist, television producer, executive

Doreen Marjorie Gorsky née Doreen Stephens (12 October 1912 – 20 March 2001), was a British Liberal Party politician, feminist and television producer and executive who during her career specialised in women's and children's programmes.

== Early life and marriages ==
Doreen Stephens was born in Hammersmith. She was educated at a private boarding school in Folkestone, before attending finishing schools in Brussels and Wimbledon.

In 1933, at the age of 19, she married a stockbroker, Richard Holden, with whom she had two children, though after five years, the couple divorced. During the war, she was a commandant in the British Red Cross. In 1944 at London University, she received the Gilchrist gold medal and diploma for social studies. In 1942, she married Jacob Arthur Gorsky, a London doctor and barrister and a Liberal politician.

== Political career ==
Gorsky joined the Liberal party in 1944. In 1945 she was Liberal candidate for the Hackney North Division at the 1945 General Election. It was an unpromising seat that the Liberals had not won since 1923 and had not stood a candidate since 1929. Although she came third she did manage to retain her deposit;

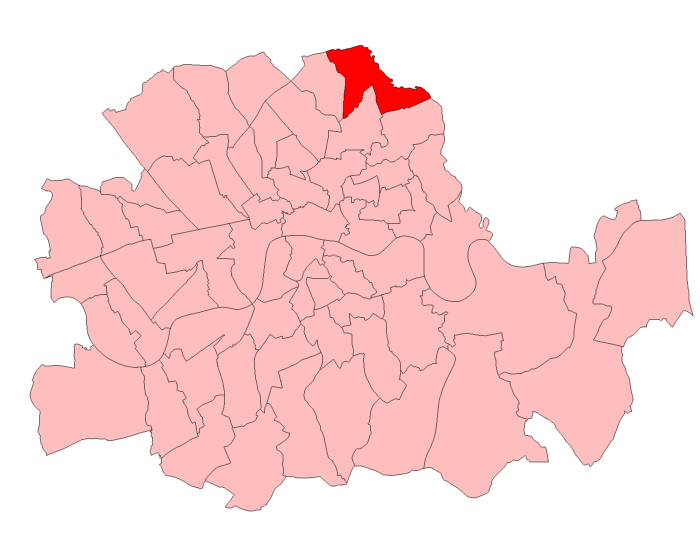
Hackney North in London 1945

General Election 1945: Hackney North
Party	Candidate	Votes	%	±%
Labour	Henry Edwin Goodrich	17,337	65.0	+16.9
Conservative	Austin Uvedale Morgan Hudson	5,771	21.7	−30.2
Liberal	Doreen Marjorie Gorsky	3,546	13.3	N/A
Majority		11,566	43.4	
Labour gain from Conservative				

In 1945, she was a Liberal candidate, alongside Francis Beaufort-Palmer for Holland ward in the Kensington Metropolitan Borough Council elections. In 1945, she joined the Married Women's Association, which argued for women's opportunities outside the domestic sphere, and the Equal-Pay-For-Equal Work Organisation, run by Thelma Cazalet. Along with Megan Lloyd George they lobbied the Labour government to introduce equal pay legislation, but the government refused. She co-authored the Liberal report The Great Partnership. This was presented to the 1949 Liberal Party Assembly. The report called for equal pay for women, equal training opportunities, better pay and more freedom for nurses, a much greater provision of day nurseries for working mothers, and a reform of the divorce law to give a woman an equal share of the marital home after a break-up. Gorsky told the Assembly: "It's easier to get a wife out than to get a tenant out". The Assembly adopted the report as party policy, making Liberal policy on women comfortably more radical and forward looking than that of the Labour party. She was elected to the Liberal Party Council. In 1949 she was a Liberal candidate, alongside John Beeching Frankenburg for Earl's Court ward in the Kensington Metropolitan Borough Council elections. In 1950, she was elected President of Women's Liberal Federation. She was a member of the Liberal Party National Executive. She was Chairman of the Women's Committee of Liberal International. In 1950, she was Liberal candidate for the Swindon Division of Wiltshire at the 1950 General Election. This was another unpromising seat that the Liberal party had never won. She again finished third with 15% of the vote. Later, in 1950, she was Liberal candidate for the Bristol South East Division of Gloucestershire at a by-election. This was a very unpromising prospect for the Liberal party, whose candidate at the last general election had polled under 10%. Her vote in the by-election was just as poor;

1950 Bristol South East by-election
Party	Candidate	Votes	%	±%
Labour	Hon. Anthony Neil Wedgwood-Benn	19,367	56.7	−5.9
Conservative	J. L. Lindsay	12,018	35.2	+8.4
Liberal	Doreen Marjorie Gorsky	2,752	8.1	−1.4
Majority		7,349	21.5	−14.3
Turnout		34,137	61.1	−23.9
Labour hold		Swing	−7.2	

In 1951, she was Liberal candidate for the Carlisle Division of Cumberland at the 1951 General Election. Again this was not a promising seat. The Liberals had not won here since 1918 though at the last election, the Liberal candidate polled nearly 20%. She could not match this and again finished third.

General Election 1951: Carlisle
Party	Candidate	Votes	%	±%
Labour	Alfred Hargreaves (aka Alex)	19,648	46.8	
Conservative	N.T. O'Reilly	16,456	39.2	
Liberal	Doreen Marjorie Gorsky	5,886	14.0	
Majority		3,192	7.6	
Turnout			87.4	
Labour hold		Swing		

She did not stand for parliament again.

== Media career ==
In 1953, she was appointed to the newly created post of Editor of Women's Television Programmes at the BBC, working under her maiden name of Miss Doreen Stephens. In 1963, she became head of family programmes, and one of the first women to hold an executive position in the corporation. She developed programmes which introduced cookery personality Fanny Cradock and keep-fit expert Eileen Fowler to viewers, as well as bringing in Play School and The Magic Roundabout for children. In 1960, she recruited McDonald Hobley – who had been an announcer and presenter in the early years of BBC Television, but left to join an ITV rival – to present programmes intended for women in the early afternoons.

She was persuaded to join London Weekend Television by David Frost, along with her BBC junior Joy Whitby, at the future ITV contractor's beginnings in 1967, and the two women were appointed to run the children's programmes department, although Stephens resigned after only two years when the company ran into difficulties. Before departing, Stephens (with Whitby) commissioned Catweazle (1970–71).

== Liberal party again ==
In 1969, she returned to active involvement when Jeremy Thorpe got her to take over from Pratap Chitnis as head of the Liberal Party Organisation. However, due to the lack of funds in the Liberal party, she agreed to work unpaid. Her work involved preparing the party for the next general election which took place in 1970. During the election, she took over responsibility for the party's three election broadcasts for television.

Party political offices
Preceded by Ethel Strudwick	President of the Women's Liberal Federation; 1950–1952	Succeeded by Malys Thompson
