= Agnes Dawson =

British politician and trade unionist

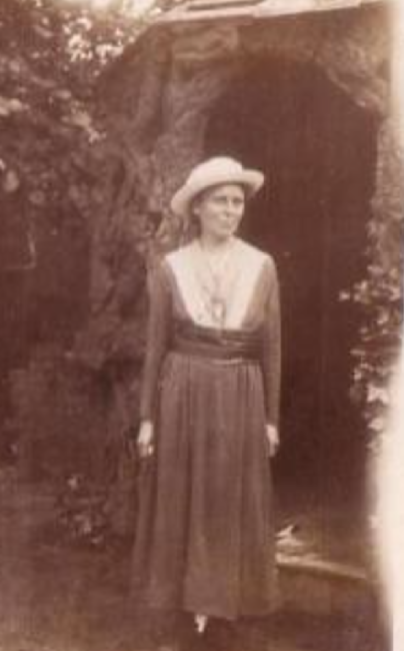
Agnes Dawson of the NUWT

Agnes Dawson (7 March 1873 – 20 April 1953) was a British politician and trade unionist.

== Life ==
Dawson was born in Peckham, she became a pupil-teacher in Camberwell before qualifying as a teacher at Saffron Walden Training College. She campaigned for women's suffrage, joining the National Union of Women's Suffrage Societies, and taking part in a boycott of the 1911 UK census.

In 1913, Dawson became a head teacher. She was also heavily involved in the National Union of Women Teachers (NUWT); a founder member, she was its vice-president in 1918, and its president in 1919/20, leading campaigns for equal pay and for married women to be allowed to teach.

Dawson was also active in the Labour Party. She stood unsuccessfully in the 1922 London County Council election in Westminster Abbey, but won Camberwell North in 1925, and quit teaching to become a full-time politician. She was re-elected in 1928 and 1931, becoming senior whip of the Labour group on the council in 1929, then vice-chair in 1931. In 1932, she was a deputy chair of the council.

In 1934, Dawson was again re-elected to the council, for the first time with a Labour majority. She became chair of its Finance and General Purposes Subcommittee. She also persuaded Herbert Morrison to lift the ban on married women teachers in London. In 1937, she stood down from the council, cut her links with the union, and moved to Newport, Essex, with her long-term companion, Anne Munns, who she described as her "pal and partner". Dawson served as a magistrate and stood for the parish council.

Munns died in 1952, and Dawson died the following year.
