= National Union of Women Teachers =

Former trade union of the United Kingdom

- Predecessor: National Union of Teachers
- Founded: 27 April 1904
- Dissolved: 1961
- Headquarters: 41 Cromwell Road, South Kensington
- Location: United Kingdom
- Members: 21,000 (1920)
- Publication: The Woman Teacher

The National Union of Women Teachers (NUWT) was a trade union representing women schoolteachers in Great Britain. It originated in 1904 as a campaign for equal pay for equal work, and dissolved in 1961, when this was achieved.

== History ==
Women teachers in the National Union of Teachers (NUT) first formed a Ladies' Committee in 1896. In 1900, this became a standing committee, consisting of the women members of the executive of the union, and some male executive members in an "ex officio" role. However, the committee focused on recruitment drives and, for example, in 1906 refused to sign a petition for women's suffrage. The union's journal, Board Teacher, was opposed to equal pay for women teachers, but the Ladies' Committee was unwilling to campaign on the issue. This inspired a small number of members to form the Equal Pay League in April 1904.

The main founders of the league were L. E. Lane, a London-based teacher who had previously campaigned to equalise payments from the union's benevolent and orphanage funds, and Joseph Tate, based in Birmingham, who became its first honorary secretary. Other founder members included Teresa Billington, who soon became the group's main organiser, and her Manchester branch became the most important section of the organisation. But growth was initially slow, with only 34 members by November, and an effort to pass an equal pay policy at the NUT conference that year was unsuccessful.

In 1906 the organisation was renamed the National Federation of Women Teachers, and it adopted a new policy of opposing increases in membership dues for women, on the grounds that they received lower benefits than male members. It successfully sponsored Isabel Cleghorn's campaign to become vice-president of the NUT in 1909. Failing to persuade the NUT to support women's suffrage, many federation members were founders of the Women Teachers' Franchise Union in 1912. Ethel Froud became honorary secretary of the federation in 1913, the position being renamed "general secretary" in 1917; she remained in post until 1940.

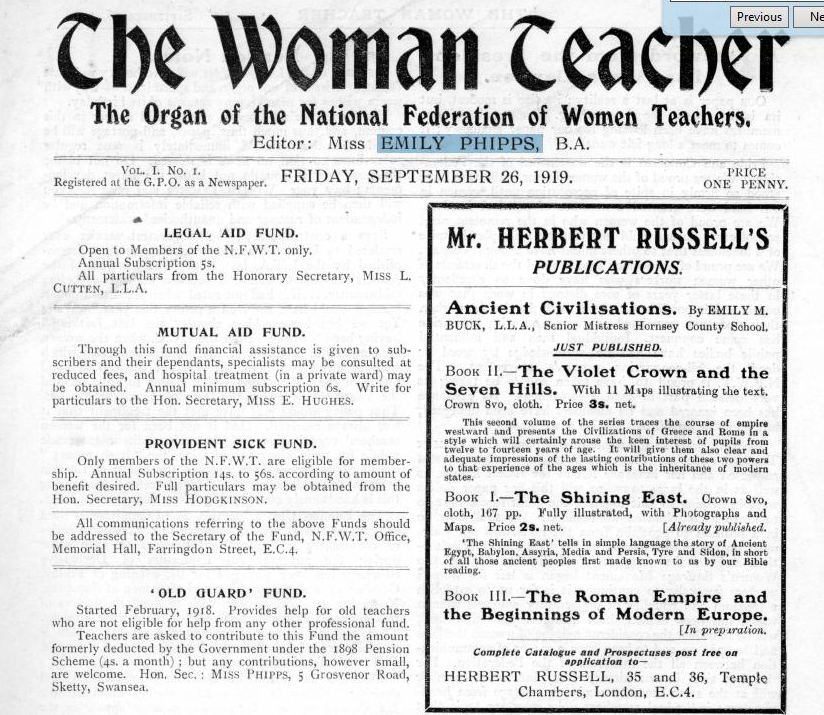
The Woman Teacher (from 1919)

By 1916, the federation's membership had grown significantly, and its members had become increasingly frustrated with continuing male control of the NUT. It decided to prepare to break away from the NUT after the conclusion of the First World War. Although the NUT finally adopted a policy of equal pay in 1919, it did not prioritise this during subsequent pay negotiations, and this was the final straw. In 1920, the federation broke away to form an independent trade union, the "National Union of Women Teachers" (NUWT). From this date, members of the central council of the NUWT were not permitted to hold membership of the NUT. Rank-and-file members were initially permitted to also join the NUT, as the union feared that otherwise its members in rural areas would be isolated. However, the union discouraged joint membership, and prohibited it in 1932.

The NUWT was a feminist organisation, maintaining close links with other groups and individuals in the feminist movement. These included the Equal Pay Campaign Committee of which it was a key member. Its main aim was to obtain equal pay for women but also interested itself in the wide range of issues affecting women teachers including the marriage bar, maternity rights and family allowances. It was also concerned with education in its widest sense and took an interest in many issues such as class sizes, corporal punishment, the school leaving age, teacher training, and wider social and political debates such as capital punishment, the minimum wage and health policy.

Membership of the union peaked at 8,500 in the mid-1920s, and thereafter gradually declined. In 1961, when equal pay had been achieved, the union wound up. Members either joined the NUT or the Association of Assistant Mistresses, while the anti-feminist National Association of Schoolmasters arranged for the formation of a new Union of Women Teachers.

Presidents of the union included Emily Phipps, Agnes Dawson, Nancy Stewart Parnell and Nan McMillan.

== Secretaries ==
1904: Joseph Tate
1913: Ethel Froud
1941: Muriel Pierotti

== Collections ==
The archive of the National Union of Women Teachers is held in the Institute of Education Archives at University College London; a partial list can be found on the online catalogue. Some material from the collection has been digitised and is available to view online at UCL's Digital Collections website.

== Published histories ==
- Kean, Hilda, Deeds Not Words: The lives of suffragette teachers, Pluto, (London, 1989).
- Phipps, Emily, A History of the National Union of Women Teachers, National Union of Women Teachers, (London, 1928).
- Pierotti, A.M The Story of the National Union of Women’s Teachers, (London, 1963).

== See also ==
- Equal pay for women
