= St David's Hospital, Carmarthen =

St David's Hospital
- Hywel Dda University Health Board
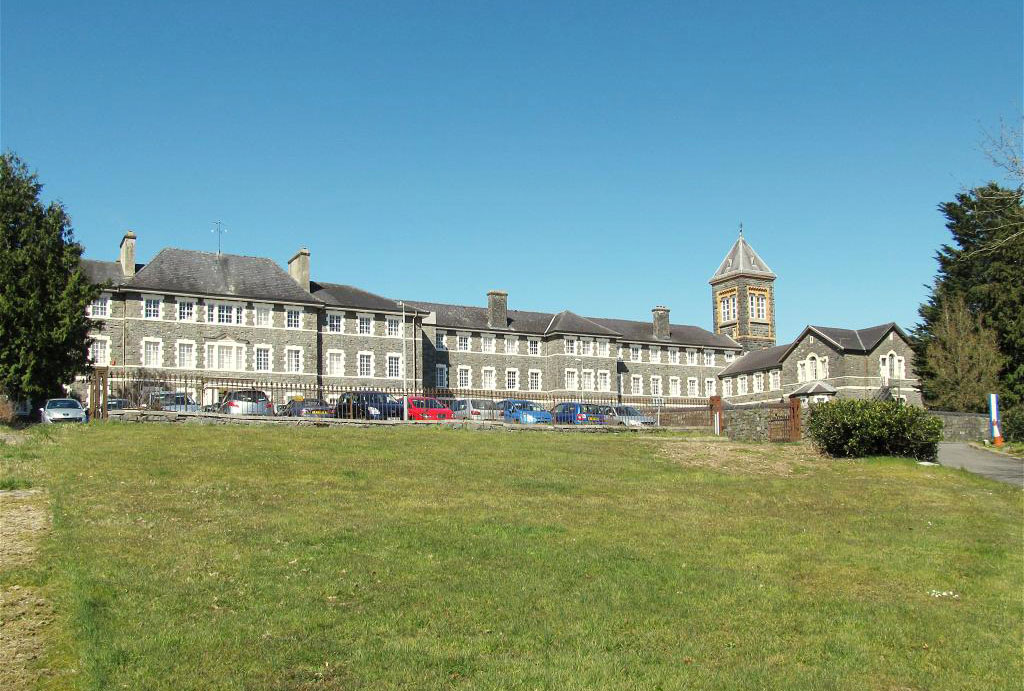
- Original former hospital building

- Shown in Carmarthenshire

Geography
- Location: Carmarthen, Wales, United Kingdom
- Coordinates: 51.85697°N 4.33200°W

Organisation
- Type: Specialist

Services
- Speciality: Psychiatric hospital

History
- Founded: 1865

Links
- Website: Cwm Seren, Tudor House & Ty Bryn
- Lists: Hospitals in Wales

St David's Hospital (Welsh: Ysbyty Dewi Sant) was a psychiatric hospital in Carmarthen, Wales. The main Victorian building is Grade II listed.

== History ==
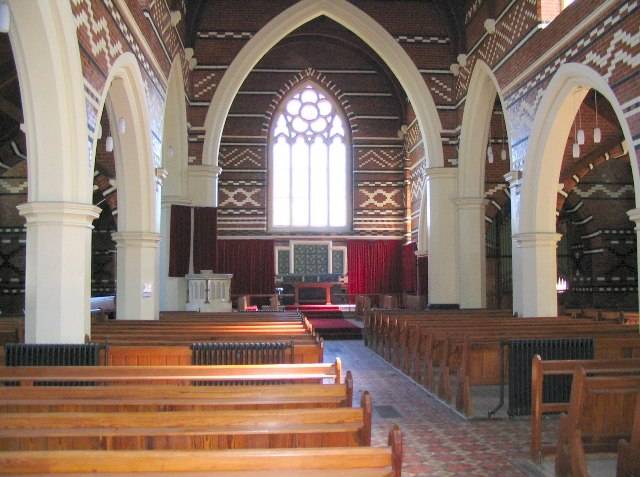
Decorative interior of the chapel

=== Formation ===
The hospital opened as the Carmarthenshire, Cardigan and Pembrokeshire County Asylum in 1865, with room for 212 patients. The architect was David Brandon. His substantial three-storey buildings were designed in an Italianate style and included men's and women's wards, day rooms, offices, a grand dining hall, and a chapel. There were workshops and exercise yards for patients. The asylum had its own water towers and a gas works. In 1870, and between 1878 and 1880, additional wings were added and early examples of cavity walling to the ventilation towers.

Between 1883 and 1889, an ambitious new chapel was built, seating 500, funded by private patients and also built entirely by the asylum's inmates. The chapel included a multicoloured interior, using strips of polychrome glazed brick.

Alice Vowe Johnson, life-long partner of Alice Abadam, was appointed second assistant medical officer to the Joint Counties Asylum in 1901. She was paid £130 for the first year, rising to a maximum of £150 in two years.

By 1929, the asylum was known as the Joint Counties Mental Hospital and, in 1948, on arrival of the National Health Service, became St David's Hospital. Capacity grew to include 940 beds by 1971.

In 1981, the buildings were given a Grade II listing as "an architectural ensemble of note, incorporating the latest ideas on hospital planning and construction". More recently recorded are the unusual examples of patient graffiti, carved into the stonework of the Victorian building.

=== Closure ===
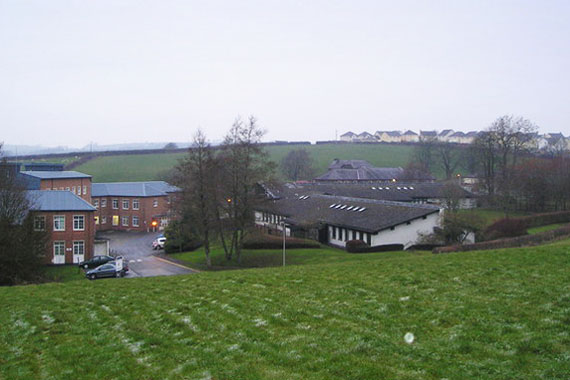
New mental health unit on the hospital site (2009)

In the early 2000s, a government report heavily criticised the standards of accommodation and care at the hospital. A patient had also died in 1999 after being administered a rapid tranquilisation when medical checks had not been carried out correctly. By April 2003, the vast majority of the 1,200 patients had been relocated to other mental health facilities, with only 100 expected to remain in a new unit on the site. Carmarthenshire Council purchased the old hospital buildings in 2003, at a cost of £3 million, to prevent the national government using them to house asylum seekers.

Hywel Dda University Health Board operate the Cwm Seren, Tudor House, and Ty Bryn psychiatric units on the original hospital's Jobswell Road site, now renamed Parc Dewi Sant (St David's Park).
