= Alice Vowe Johnson =

Doctor (1869–1938)

Alice Vowe Johnson LSA LRCP FRCSI
- Born: 1869; London, UK
- Died: December 14, 1938 (aged 68–69); Wimbledon, UK
- Burial place: St Mary's Catholic Church, Carmarthen, Wales
- Partner: Alice Abadam

Alice Neville Vowe Johnson (1869 – 14 December 1938) was a doctor in Carmarthen and London. She was the life-long partner of Alice Abadam.

== Early life and education ==
She was born in London in 1869. Her father was Edward Johnson.

She attended Katherine Lodge in London, Les Ruches in Fontainebleau, and the London School of Medicine for Women.

She became a Licentiate of the Society of Apothecaries in 1893, and qualified as a surgeon from Edinburgh University and became a Licentiate of the Royal College of Physicians in 1901. She obtained an M.D. from the University of Brussels and became a Fellow of Royal College of Surgeons in Ireland in 1903. She also had a Diploma in Public Health from Cambridge University.

== Career ==
By 1901, Johnson had worked as a clinical assistant at the New Hospital for Women; an assistant-physician and anaesthetist at Canning Town Medical Mission Hospital; and a dresser at Great Ormond Street Hospital for Children and the Royal Free Hospital. She had worked in a hospital in Vienna and done medical work in Egypt.

Alice Johnson's first appointment was second assistant medical officer to the Joint Counties Asylum in Carmarthen in 1901. She was paid £130 for the first year, rising to a maximum of £150 in two years.

In 1904, she was appointed as medical officer and examiner of the Lambeth Poor Law Schools in West Norwood by Lambeth Board of Guardians and the Board of Education.

In 1905, an outbreak of diphtheria at the Lambeth Poor Law School meant Johnson had to isolate 160 children, with 30 in the hospital. She also removed the tonsils from nearly 100 children to prevent the spread of tonsilitis.

In 1906, the Lambeth Board of Guardians proposed that Johnson should incur the expense for any emergency medical attendance by her deputy, but she objected. Instead, they decided to apply to the Local Government Board for funds.

In 1909, she sued Albert Kendall and the Brixton Free Press Printing and Advertising Company for libel due to comments made in the Norwood Observer newspaper about her medical advice. At the time, she still worked as the medical officer to the Lambeth Poor Law Schools in West Norwood. The court ordered the newspaper to apologise and paid 40 shillings to Johnson.

A copy of the speech called "Open Air Schools" she gave at the Women's Congress in White City on 10 June 1910, which was printed for the Women's National Health Association, is held in the University of Strathclyde Archives.

She submitted a paper on the Gheel system in Belgium to a conference on the aftercare of the feeble-minded held in Brighton on 27 October 1911.

During World War I, she worked at the Chelsea Red Cross Hospital.

She also worked as the medical officer at the Central Foundation School.

She spent 20 years working as the medical officer of the "Bird in the Bush" Mothers' and Infants' Welfare Centre in Old Kent Road.

She was a member of the British Medical Association for 44 years.

== Personal life ==
She met Alice Abadam in 1901, and they were partners for the rest of their lives, moving to London together in 1903. In 1904, Johnson and Abadam bought a house in Upper Norwood. They moved together to St John's Wood in 1926.

She enjoyed music and Alpine climbing. She was a member of the Catholic Women's League. Together with Abadam, Johnson helped establish the order of the Sisters of the Holy Ghost in Carmarthen after they were displaced from a convent in Brittany.

== Death ==
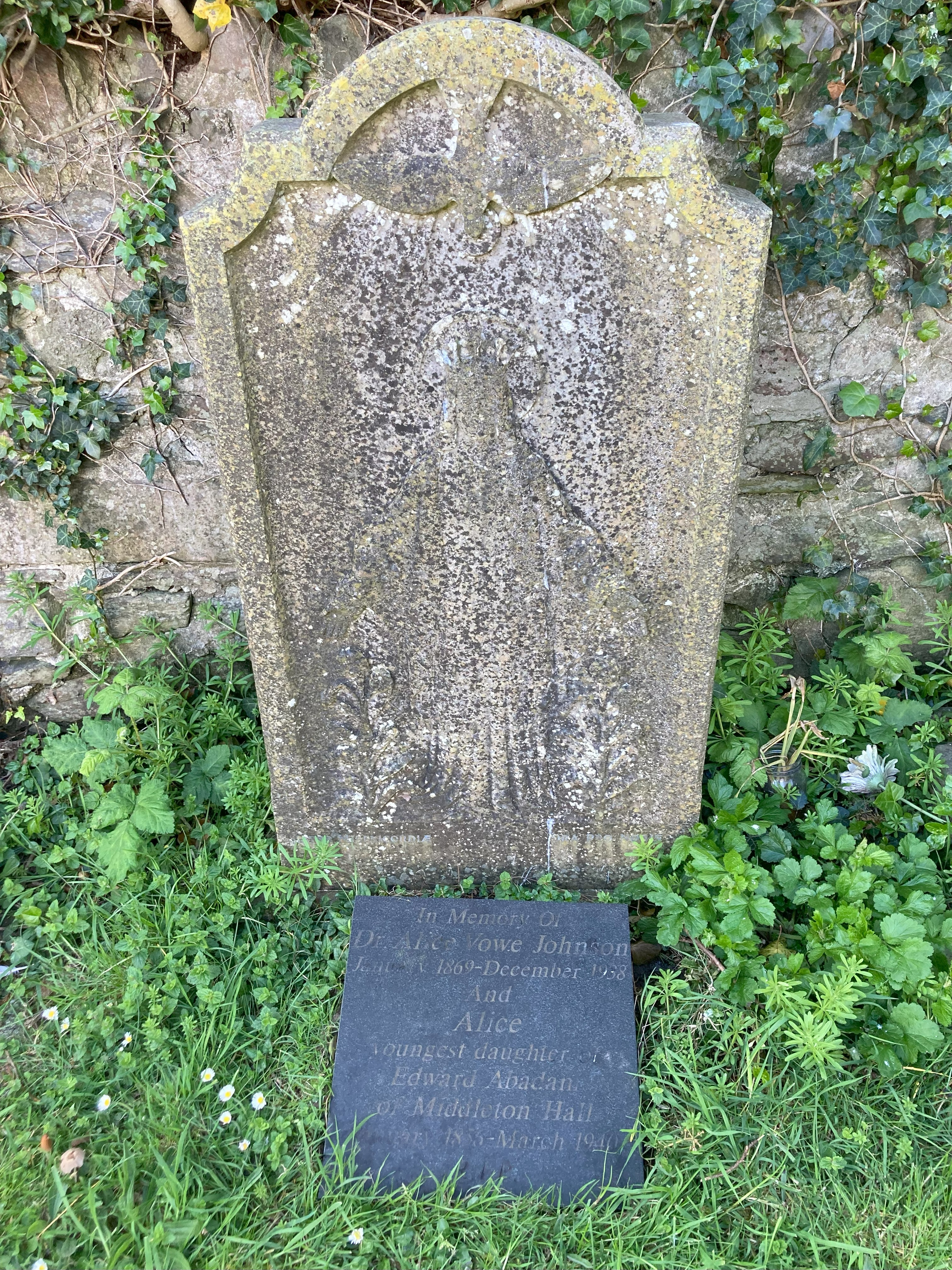
Graves and memorial stone of Alice Vowe Johnson and Alice Abadam in the graveyard of St Mary's Catholic Church, Carmarthen in 2025

She died on 14 December 1938 on Clifton Road in Wimbledon.

She was buried at St Mary's Catholic Church in Carmarthen. On her death two years later, Alice Abadam was buried with her.

== Publications ==
- Johnson, Alice V. (1907). "The testing of the hearing of 514 mentally deficient children" (PDF). Second International Congress on School Hygience. II. London: The Royal Sanitary Institute: 776–778.
- Johnson, Alice Vowe (21 June 1913). "PHYLACOGEN TREATMENT OF PUSTULANT ECZEMA". The Lancet. 181 (4686). Elsevier: 1764–1765. doi:10.1016/S0140-6736(01)38540-9. ISSN 0140-6736.
- Johnson, Alice Neville Vowe (April 1916). "Infant mortality and the population". Dublin Review. 158: 324–335.
