= Henry Day (priest) =

British writer and priest (1865–1951)

Henry Cyril Day, S.J. (29 May 1865 – 23 January 1951) was a British Catholic priest and author.

== Biography ==
He was educated at Beaumont College, in Old Windsor, Berkshire. From there he entered the Society of Jesus in 1884 and was ordained in 1894. Day was opposed to women's suffrage and was criticised vehemently by Welsh Catholic suffragist Alice Abadam in Catholic magazines in 1911-12.

Day in offered his service as a chaplain days before the outbreak of World War I and served in Egypt, Gallipoli, Macedonia, and France.

He was decorated with the Serbian White Eagle and was awarded the Military Cross.

== Works ==
- (1908). Socialism and the Catholic Church.
- (1912). Marriage, Divorce and Morality.
- (1914). Catholic Democracy, Individualism and Socialism (with a preface by Cardinal Bourne).
- (1922). A Cavalry Chaplain (with an introduction by Sir W. E. Peyton).
- (1924). The New Morality: A Candid Criticism.
- (1927). The Love Story of the Little Flower.
- (1930). Macedonian Memories (with a preface by Sir George F. Milne).
- (1937). On the Troopship to India.
- (1937). An Army Chaplain's War Memories.
