= Edward Abadam =

Welsh magistrate (1809–1875)

- Born: 1809
- Died: November 27, 1875 (aged 65–66); Llanarthne, Carmarthenshire, Wales
- Occupation: Justice of the peace
- Spouse: Louisa Taylor (m. 1836)
- Children: Alice Abadam
- Parents: Edward Hamlyn Adams (father); Amelia Sophia Macpherson (mother)

Edward Abadam (né Adams; 1809 – 27 November 1875) was a justice of the peace and the High Sheriff of Carmarthenshire in 1855. He lived at Middleton Hall, now part of the National Botanic Garden of Wales site, which was targeted during the Rebecca Riots.

== Early life ==
Edward Adams was born in 1809, the eldest son of Edward Hamlyn Adams and Amelia Sophia (née Macpherson).

== Middleton Hall ==
Edward Hamlyn Adams bought Middleton Hall in 1824 after the death of William Paxton. He and his son made landscape improvements in the grounds, including building a black marble bridge over the lake in 1841, and added extensively to the house. The hall was altered and redecorated in the 1840s, including the addition of a lift, which may have been the only lift in domestic use in Wales. Edward Abadam inherited the estate after his father's death in 1842.

In 1843, during the Rebecca Riots, two large haystacks, containing sixty tons of hay, worth £200, were set alight by rioters in retaliation for dealing with Rebeccaites harshly in his role as magistrate, particularly the small fine given to the lessee of the Kidwelly Trust for setting up unauthorised toll-gates in Porthyrhyd, and for his refusal to lower his rents. He was invited to meet with rioters on a hilltop to discuss petitioning the Queen about the new Poor Law, but Abadam refused to attend.

Thomas Herbert Cooke, who worked as the land agent to Abadam and his father before him, complained about Abadam in letters to his mother dated 1841 to 1851, which were acquired by the National Library of Wales in 1973. Cooke was frustrated by Abadam keeping unusual hours, taking little interest in the daily management of the estate, and being preoccupied with personal building and decorating projects, despite Abadam being very popular with his tenantry. In September 1843, Abadam received a letter from the Rebeccaites urging him to replace Cooke, but Abadam refused. Cooke left Middleton Hall by 1847 after securing a position at Berkeley Castle in Gloucestershire.

Stone at the National Botanic Garden of Wales commemorating a circus held by Edward Abadam in 1855

A stone, commemorating a circus held by Edward Abadam at Middleton Hall in 1855, was discovered nearby. The stone is now displayed at the Cae Syrcas ("Circus Field") at the National Botanic Garden of Wales. It reads:

EDW. ABADAM
MIDDLETON HALL
CIRCUS
1855

== Career ==
Abadam was a justice of the peace, as well as the High Sheriff of Carmarthenshire in 1855.

== Personal life and death ==
Abadam married Louisa (née Taylor) in 1836, and together they had several children, including Alice Abadam.

On 9 October 1951, Edward Abadam adopted the surname "Abadam" by deed poll, after tracing his descent from Johanes ab Adam, Lord of Beverstone and Tidenham, who died in 1310.

Edward Abadam died aged 66 on 27 November 1875.
