= Villa Il Palmerino =

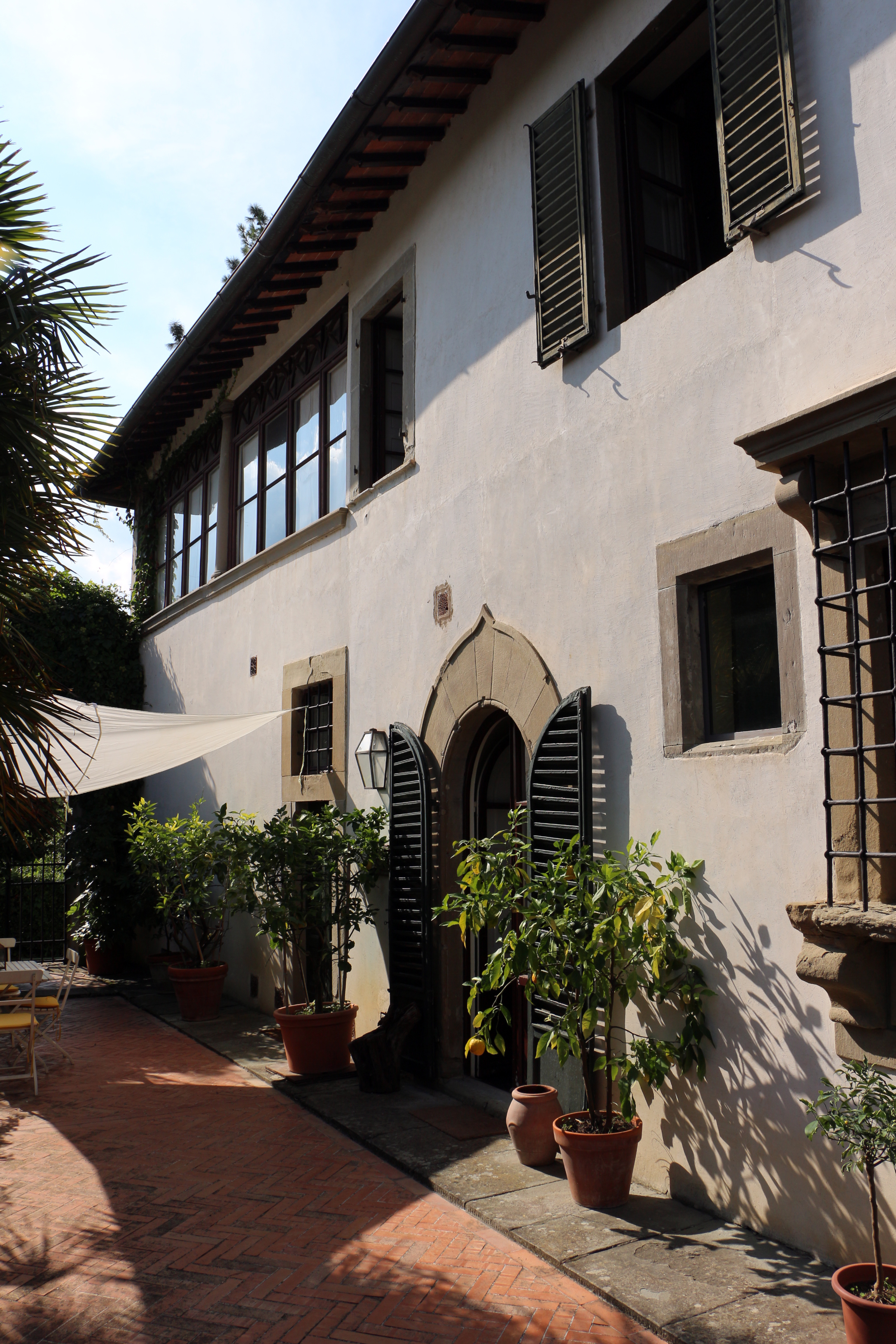
- Interactive map of the Villa Il Palmerino area

General information
- Type: Tuscan farmhouse
- Location: via del Palmerino 8, Florence, Italy
- Coordinates: 43.7922°N 11.2927°E

Villa il Palmerino is a villa in Settignano, in the north-eastern part of the city of Florence, in central Italy. It lies in the hills below Fiesole, close to the frazione and convent of San Domenico. From about 1889 it was the home of the British writer Violet Paget, who wrote under the pseudonym "Vernon Lee", and was at that time also known as Villa Paget.

== History ==
Il Palmerino lies in the valley of the Affrico (a right tributary of the Arno) in Settignano, in the hills below Fiesole, to the north-east of the city of Florence.

The first documented owner was the fifteenth-century Florentine goldsmith Ottaviano d'Antonio di Duccio, the brother of Agostino di Duccio (who is incorrectly described by Giorgio Vasari as brother to Luca Della Robbia). On the death of Ottaviano the property passed to his daughters Lorenza and Margherita; in 1545 Margherita's husband Benedetto di Papi Palmerini bought out Lorenza's share, made improvements to the villa, and established a commenda, a type of mediaeval religious trust under which the church owned the property but the income was assigned to a secular beneficiary. The last member of the family to benefit from the arrangement was Jacopo Palmerini, who died on 22 June 1705. The estate then passed to Giovanni Battista Federighi, whose son Antonio sold it in 1724 to Pier Francesco Mormorai. In 1795 Zanobi Mormorai left it in his will to Bernardo and Francesco, sons of Dionisi Baldi della Scarperia. In 1855 it passed into the ownership of the Franciscan friars of Santa Croce. With the suppression of the religious orders following the unification of Italy, it became public property, and on 18 February 1868 was sold at auction to Luigi De Pier-Uccioni.

In 1889 the parents of Violet Paget rented it, and – with Violet and her half-brother – moved from the city of Florence to live there. It was a typical square Tuscan farmhouse, facing onto the road, and had several agricultural buildings. Paget's mother died in 1896, and her brother went to the United States. In 1906 Paget was able to buy the property, and lived there until her death in 1935.

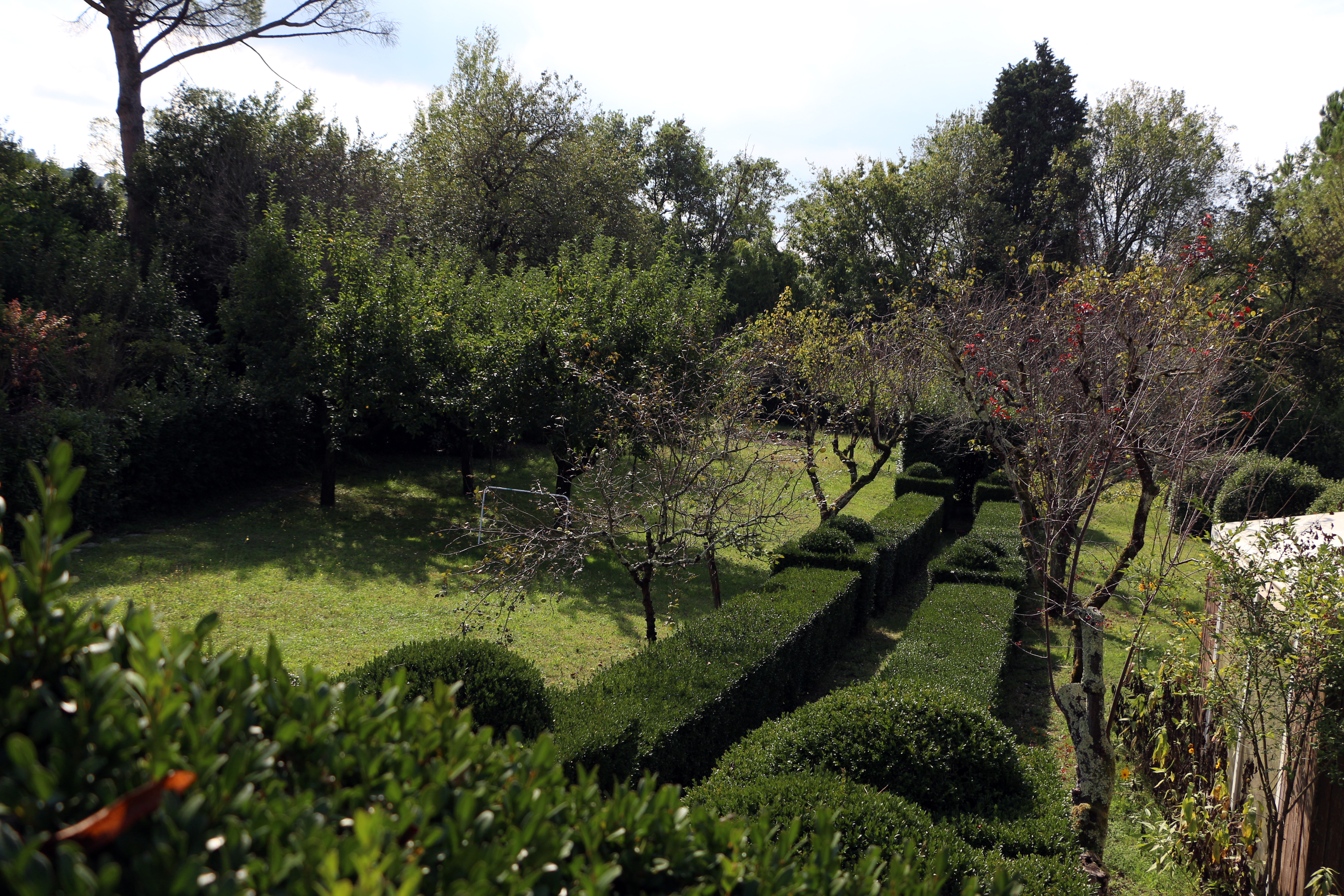
The gardens

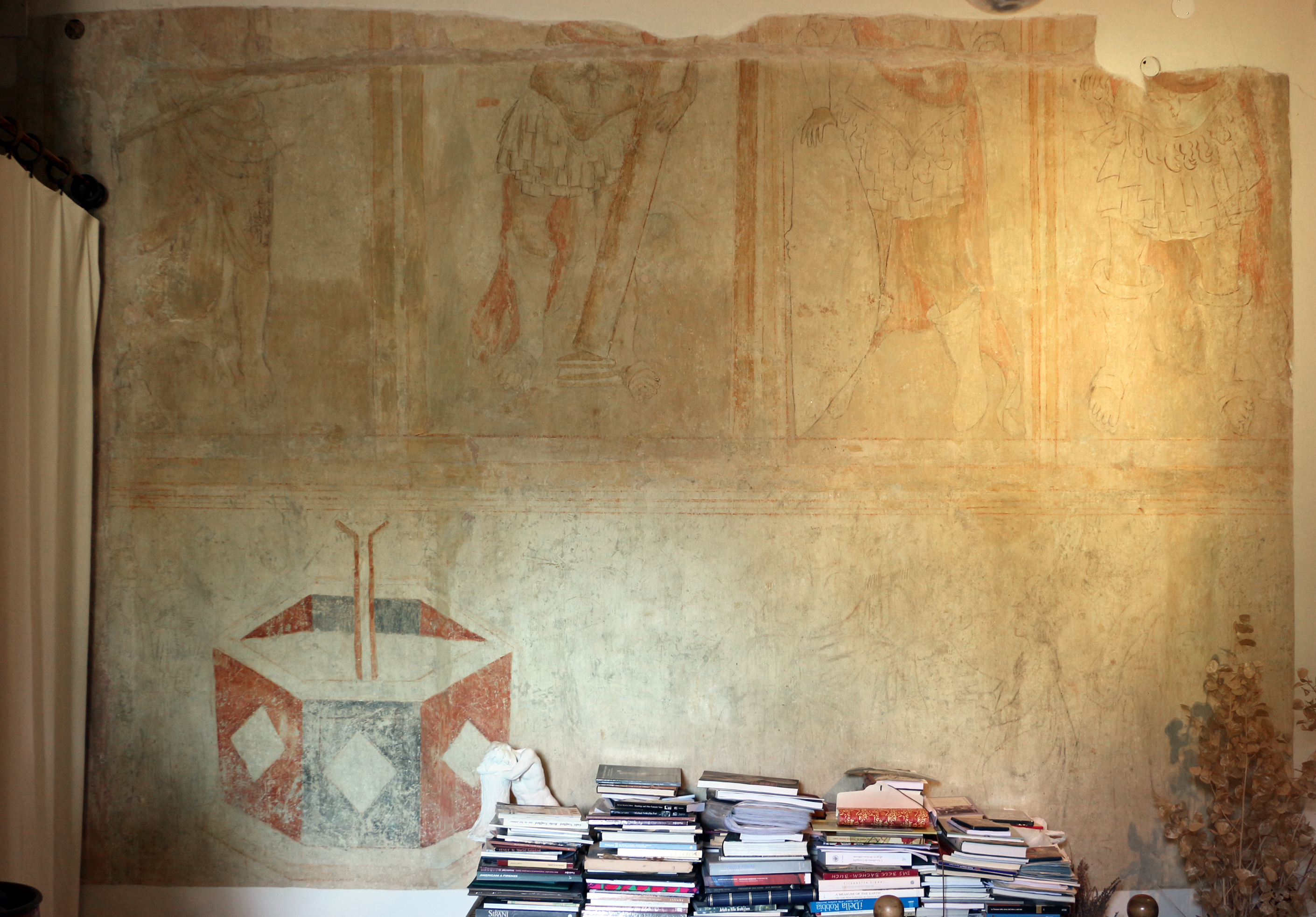
Fonte della giovinezza e uomini illustri, fifteenth-century fresco

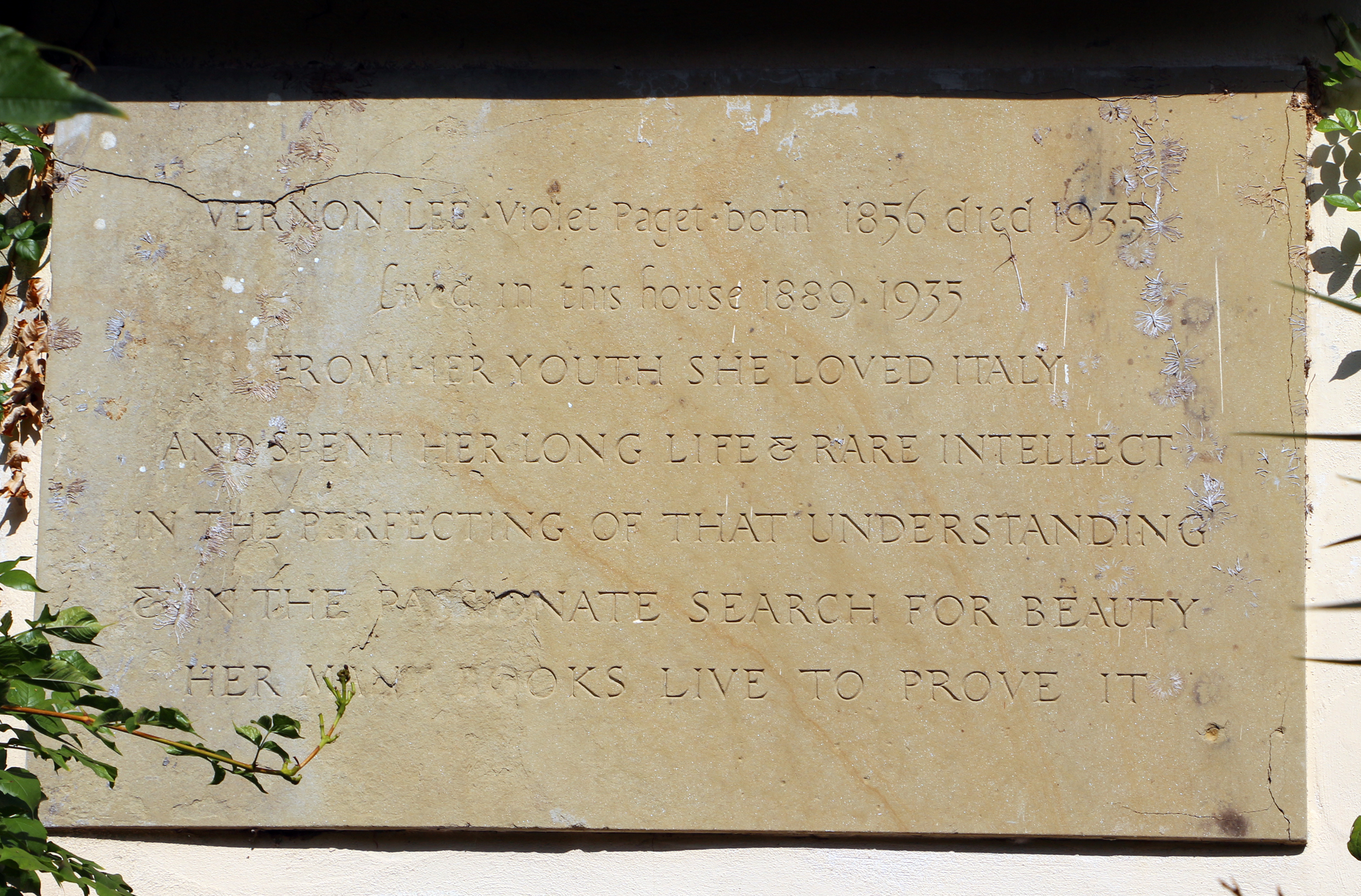
Vernon Lee plaque
