= Vernon Lee =

French-born British art historian and writer (1856–1935)

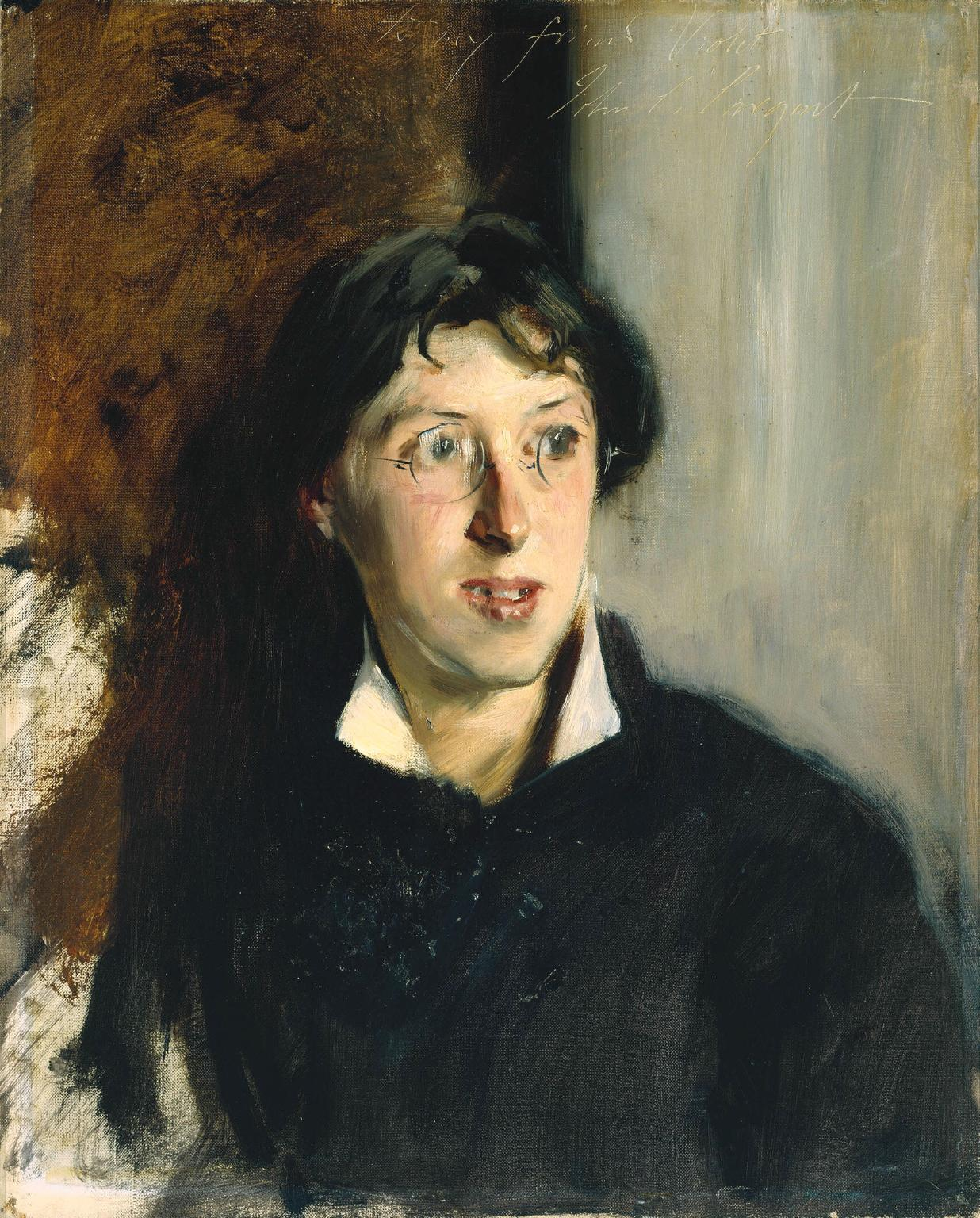
- Portrait of Violet Paget by John Singer Sargent
- Born: Violet Paget; 14 October 1856; Château St Léonard, near Boulogne-sur-Mer, Pas-de-Calais, France
- Died: 13 February 1935 (aged 78); San Gervasio Bresciano, Italy
- Occupations: Short-story writer, essayist
- Writing career
- Genres: Short story, supernatural

Violet Paget (14 October 1856 – 13 February 1935), known by the pseudonym Vernon Lee, was a French-born British art historian and writer. She is remembered today primarily for her supernatural fiction and her work on aesthetics. An early follower of Walter Pater, she wrote over a dozen volumes of essays on art, music and travel.

== Early life ==
Lee was born Violet Paget on 14 October 1856 at Château St Léonard, near Boulogne-sur-Mer to Henry Ferguson Paget (1820–1894) and Matilda Paget (née Adams, formerly Lee-Hamilton; 1815–1896). Lee's father is believed to have been raised in Warsaw as the son of a French nobleman. The maternal granddaughter of Edward Hamlyn Adams, a lawyer, slave contractor and politician, Lee was cousin of the suffragist, women’s rights campaigner and feminist Alice Abadam. Through her mother's first marriage, Lee was the half-sister of the poet Eugene Lee-Hamilton.

== Career ==
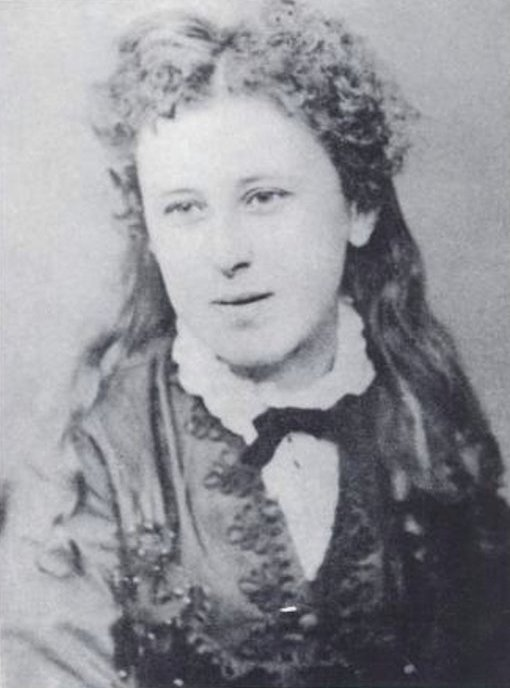
Lee c. 1870

Although she primarily wrote for an English readership and made many visits to London, she spent the majority of her life on the continent in Europe, particularly in Italy.

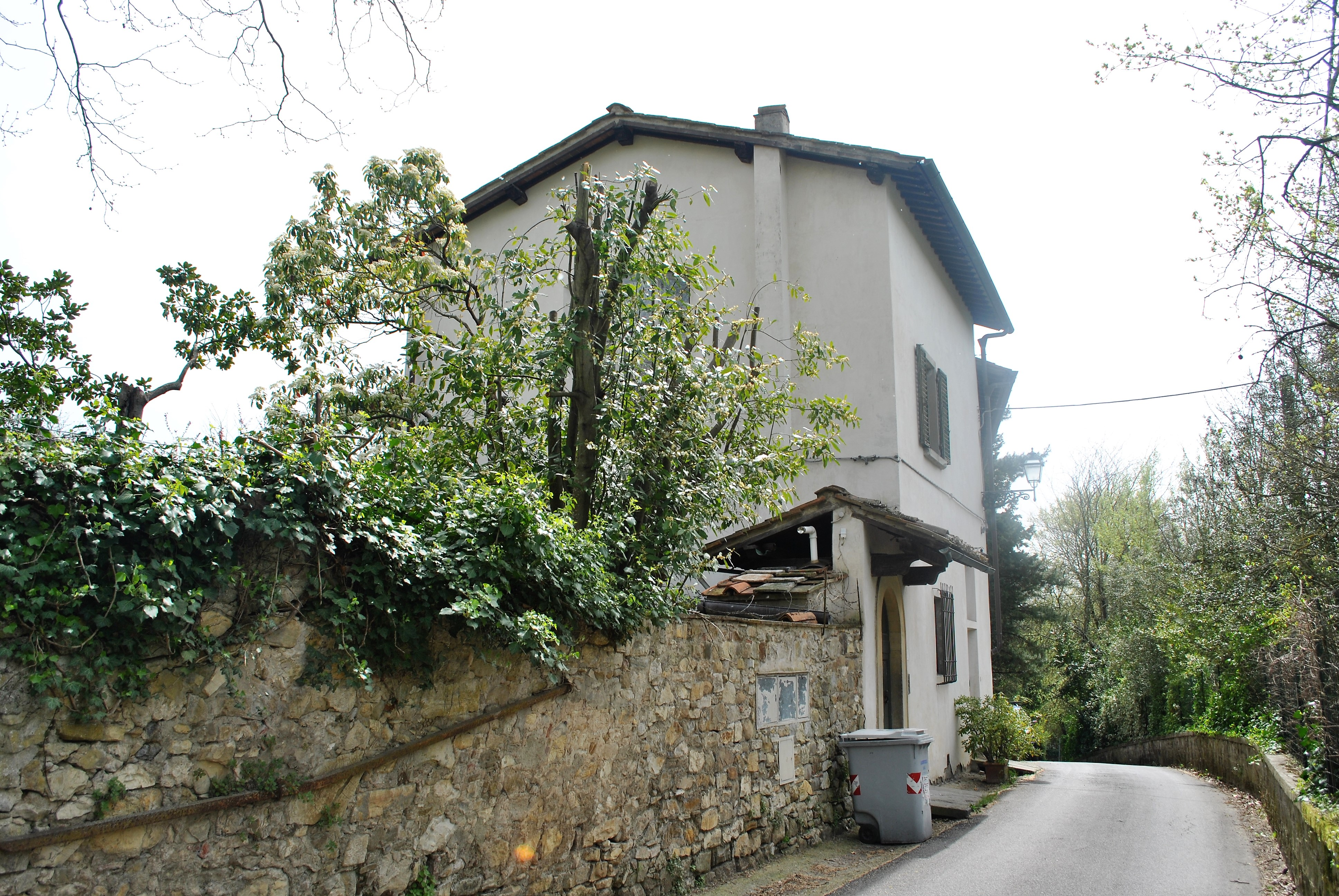
Villa Il Palmerino, outside Florence

Her longest residence was at Villa Il Palmerino just outside Florence, from 1889 until her death at San Gervasio Bresciano in 1935, with a brief interruption during the First World War. Her library was left to the British Institute of Florence and can still be inspected by visitors. In Florence, she knit lasting friendships with the painter Telemaco Signorini and the learned Mario Praz, and she encouraged his love of learning and English literature.

An engaged feminist, she always dressed à la garçonne. During the First World War, Lee adopted strong pacifist views and was a member of the anti-militarist organisation the Union of Democratic Control. Scholars speculate that Lee was a lesbian and had long-term intense relationships with three women, Mary Robinson, Clementina Anstruther-Thomson, and British author Amy Levy.

She played the harpsichord and her appreciation of music animates her first major work, Studies of the Eighteenth Century in Italy (1880). In her preface to the second edition of 1907, she recalled her excitement as a girl when she came across a bundle of 18th-century music. She was so nervous that it wouldn't live up to her expectations that she escaped to the garden and listened rapturously through an open window as her mother worked out the music on the piano. Along with Pater and John Addington Symonds, she was considered an authority on the Italian Renaissance, and wrote two works that dealt with it explicitly, Euphorion (1884) and Renaissance Fancies and Studies (1895).

Her short fiction explored the themes of haunting and possession. She dedicated her short ghost story "A Wicked Voice" to composer Mary Augusta Wakefield in 1887. The most famous stories were collected in Hauntings (1890) and her story "Prince Alberic and the Snake Lady" (1895) was first printed in the notorious The Yellow Book. She was instrumental in the introduction of the German concept of Einfühlung, or 'empathy' into the study of aesthetics in the English-speaking world.

She developed her own theory of psychological aesthetics in collaboration with her lover, Kit Anstruther-Thomson, based on previous works by William James, Theodor Lipps, and Karl Groos. She claimed that spectators "empathise" with works of art when they call up memories and associations and cause often unconscious bodily changes in posture and breathing.

She was known for her numerous essays about travel in Italy, France, Germany, and Switzerland, which attempted to capture the psychological effects of places rather than to convey any particular piece of information. Like her friend Henry James, she wrote critically about the relationship between writers and their audience, pioneering the idea of critical assessment among all the arts as relating to an audience's personal response. She was a proponent of the Aesthetic movement and after a lengthy written correspondence, met the movement's effective leader, Walter Pater, in England in 1881, just after encountering one of Pater's most famous disciples, Oscar Wilde.

Her open resistance against the Great War and her work Satan the Waster led to her being ostracized by the younger generation of scholars and writers. Feminist research led to a rediscovery since the 1990s.

Much of her incoming personal correspondence is preserved in Somerville College Library.

Film of her on holiday in France in the 1930s is held in the archives of Memoire Normandie.

== Critical reception ==
The English writer and translator Montague Summers described Vernon Lee as "the greatest [...] of modern exponents of the supernatural in fiction." Summers also compared Lee's work to that of M. R. James. E. F. Bleiler has claimed that "Lee's stories are really in a category by themselves. Intelligent, amusingly ironic, imaginative, original, they deserve more than the passing attention that they have attracted". Neil Barron described the contents of Lee's collection Hauntings thus "The stories are powerful and very striking, among the finest of their kind."

== Works ==
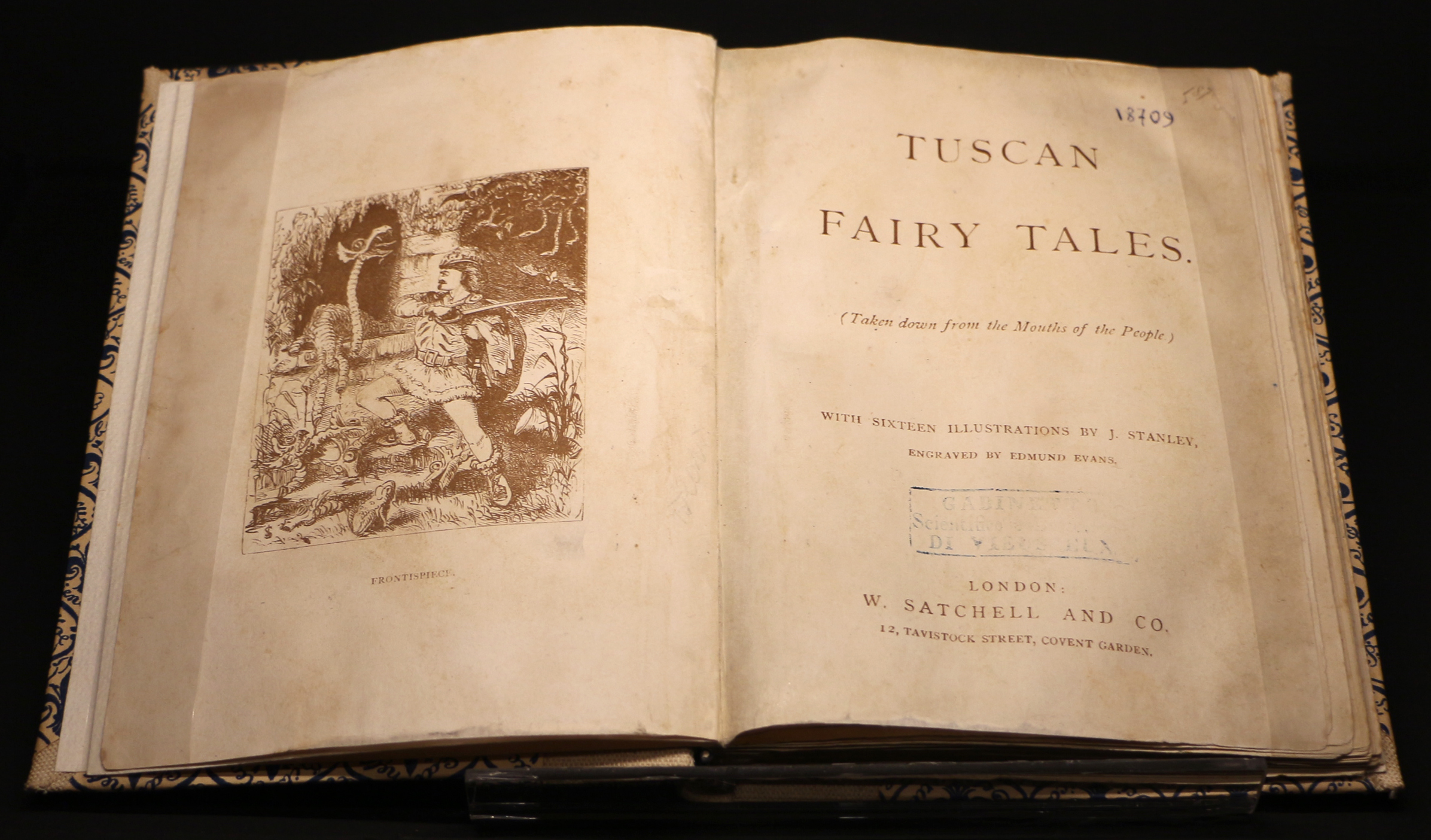
Tuscan Fairy Tales (1880)

- Studies of the Eighteenth Century in Italy (1880)
- A Culture-Ghost; or, Winthrop's Adventure (1881) novella published in the April 1881 issue of Appletons' Journal.
- Belcaro, Being Essays on Sundry Aesthetical Questions (1881)
- Ottilie: An Eighteenth Century Idyl (1883)
- The Prince of the Hundred Soups: A Puppet Show in Narrative (1883)
- The Countess of Albany (1884)
- Miss Brown (1884) novel
- Euphorion: Being Studies of the Antique and the Mediaeval in the Renaissance (1884)
- Baldwin: Being Dialogues on Views and Aspirations (1886)
- A Phantom Lover: A Fantastic Story (1886) novella, also Oke of Okehurst, Alice Oke
- Juvenilia, Being a second series of essays on sundry aesthetical questions (1887)
- Hauntings. Fantastic Stories (1890)
- Vanitas: Polite Stories (1892)
- Althea: Dialogues on Aspirations & Duties (1894)
- Renaissance Fancies And Studies Being A Sequel To Euphorion (1895)
- Art and Life (1896)
- Limbo and Other Essays (1897)
- Genius Loci: Notes on Places (1899) travel essays
- The Child In The Vatican (1900)
- In Umbria: A Study of Artistic Personality (1901)
- Chapelmaster Kreisler A Study of Musical Romanticists (1901)
- Penelope Brandling: A Tale of the Welsh Coast in the Eighteenth Century (1903)
- The Legend of Madame Krasinska (1903)
- Ariadne in Mantua: a Romance in Five Acts (1903)
- Hortus Vitae: Essays on the Gardening of life (1903)
- Pope Jacynth – And Other Fantastic Tales (1904)
- The Enchanted Woods, and Other Essays on the Genius of Places (1905) travel essays
- Sister Benvenuta and the Christ Child, an eighteenth-century legend (1906)
- The Spirit of Rome: Leaves from a Diary (1906)
- Ravenna and Her Ghosts (1907)
- The Sentimental Traveller . Notes on Places (1908) travel essays
- Gospels of Anarchy & Other Contemporary Studies (1908)
- Laurus Nobilis: Chapters on Art and Life (1909)
- In Praise of Old Gardens (1912) with others
- Beauty and Ugliness and Other Studies in Psychological Aesthetics (1912) with Clementine Anstruther-Thomson
- Vital Lies: Studies of Some Varieties of Recent Obscurantism (1912)
- The Beautiful. An Introduction to Psychological Aesthetics (1913)
- The Tower of the Mirrors and Other Essays on the Spirit of Places (1914) travel essays
- Louis Norbert. A Twofold Romance (1914) novel
- The Ballet of the Nations. A Present-Day Morality (1915) illustrations by Maxwell Armfield
- Satan the Waster: A Philosophic War Trilogy (1920)
- The Handling of Words and Other Studies in Literary Psychology (1923)
- Proteus or The Future Of Intelligence (1925)
- The Golden Keys and Other Essays on the Genius Loci (1925) travel essays
- The Poet's Eye, Notes on Some Differences Between Verse and Prose (Hogarth Press, 1926)
- For Maurice. Five Unlikely Stories (1927)
- Music and its Lovers: An Empirical Study of Emotional and Imaginative Responses to Music (1932)

== Editions published posthumously ==
- Snake Lady and Other Stories (1954)
- Supernatural Tales (1955)
- The Virgin of the Seven Daggers – And Other Chilling Tales of Mystery and Imagination (1962)

== Bilingual editions ==
- Unsere Liebe Frau der Sieben Dolche / The Virgin of the Seven Daggers, bilingual (German/English) edition. Calambac Publishing House, Saarbrücken 2017. ISBN 978-3-943117-92-9.
