= Eugene Lee-Hamilton =

English poet and translator (1845–1907)

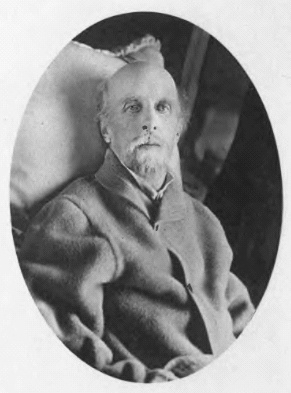
- Born: 6 January 1845; London, England
- Died: 9 September 1907 (aged 62); Bagni di Lucca, Italy
- Resting place: Florence, Italy
- Education: Oxford University
- Occupation: Poet
- Spouse: Annie E. Holdsworth
- Children: Persis, daughter
- Relatives: Vernon Lee, half-sister
- Writing career
- Period: Fin-de-siècle

Eugene Lee-Hamilton (6 January 1845 – 9 September 1907) was a late Victorian English poet. His work includes some notable sonnets in the style of Petrarch. He endowed a literary prize administered by Oriel College in Oxford University, where he was a student. The prize is open to students of Oxford and of Cambridge University and continues to this day.

== Life and works ==
Eugene Lee-Hamilton was born in London on 6 January 1845; his parents were James Lee-Hamilton, who died in 1852, and Matilda (née Abadam, later Paget) (1815–1896), daughter of Edward Hamlyn Adams. He had a younger half sister Violet Paget, who wrote as Vernon Lee. A maternal cousin was British suffragist Alice Abadam.

Lee-Hamilton was educated mainly in France and Germany. In 1864 he was sent to the University of Oxford. In 1869 he entered the British diplomatic service. He was first attached to the Embassy at Paris, where, due to his early experiences of French life, and mastery of the French language, he was eminently suitable. After the Franco-German War broke out he took part in the Alabama arbitration at Geneva. Subsequently he was appointed secretary in the British Legation at Lisbon. He had to renounce this second position in 1873, when, suddenly, he collapsed altogether, losing the use of his legs, and suffering agonies of pain. He expressed it in one of his sonnets,

"To keep through life the posture of the grave,

While others walk and run and dance and leap."

It was to while away the tedium arising out of this malady that he first took to composing verse. All of his poetry from this time was composed without his touching pen or paper, and subsequently dictated.

=== Early poems ===
Hamilton's first miscellaneous poems appeared in 1878, and attracted no notice whatever; and it was only with the publication of The New Medusa that his poetry began to receive attention. This volume was followed, in 1885, by one entitled Apollo and Marsyas, and his next publication, entitled Imaginary Sonnets, came out in the fall of 1888. As a writer of sonnets he is most remarkable.

He spent much of his adult life suffering from psychological ailments. (Note: Linda Villari in the Albany Review (1908), "Doctors came and went to little effect, and by most of them his malady was soon pronounced to be a most perilous case of cerebro-spinal disease. By the following year (1874) all hope of recovery seemed gone; and thus, at the age of twenty-nine, this promising young diplomatist and budding poet had to renounce all his ambitions and try to resign himself to a lingering death. Accordingly, refusing all medical treatment, he would only accept his dear mother's care and assistance. So by slow stages she brought him to her own home in Italy, henceforth his adopted country. At any rate the original diagnosis of his case had been far too pessimistic, for at long last, and dating, I think, from the time when the family left their Florence flat, and settled in the pleasant Villa Palmerino among vineyards and olive-groves a few miles away, certain signs of improvement began to appear in his general condition. But they were such faint signs as to be almost unheeded by the patient himself. Having long renounced every hope of recovery he could not realise that any change should be for the better. He had tried too many doctors in vain, so refused to consult any more. But his sister had heard of a foreign specialist who had succeeded in curing cases of the same nature. Accordingly she consulted him on her own responsibility, and, by applying the treatment he prescribed, gradually roused her brother's will to be cured. Evidently the main disease, and its accompanying nervous prostration were both diminishing. The first triumph came the day that the sick man discovered he could stand on his feet for two minutes. Then, still more gradually, with many throw-backs, power of movement returned, but it was only in 1894 that the miracle was completed, and Lee-Hamilton restored to the active world of men. Save for a very slight limp, there was no outer trace of invalidism. He seemed to have regained his lost youth at a bound, for he re-entered society with all the zest of an undergraduate.")

He was nursed by his mother and sporadically by his half-sister, Violet Paget, who wrote under the name Vernon Lee. Lee-Hamilton lived with his mother and step-father in Florence, Italy, during his illness, and it was only after his mother died in 1896 and he recovered that he was able to travel again, eventually marrying the novelist Annie E. Holdsworth in 1898 and fathering a child, Persis Margaret, in 1903, but she died of meningitis in infancy. This led to him writing the poem, Mimma Bella; In Memory of a Little Life. (Note: Villari, "But he soon fell ill and one malady followed another in lamentably quick succession. Surgical treatment in Switzerland cured him of one complaint, but his nerves were irretrievably shaken, and his heart became dangerously weak. Then in November 1906 he was prostrated by a stroke of paralysis, accompanied by other even more alarming symptoms. Still one did not lose hope, for there were frequent rallies; he even regained some power of movement, showed all his usual interest in men and things, enjoyed receiving his friends in the shady villa garden, and read much, although unable to hold a pen. When spring merged into summer it became necessary to take him to some cooler spot within a day's journey from Florence; so the Baths of Lucca were chosen, and a hillside villa at some distance from his old quarters was found for him. At first he rather shrank from revisiting the scene of so many painful memories, but soon, I think, he looked forward to regaining his health there. I saw my old friend for the last time on the eve of his departure. He seemed very cheerful, and solely troubled by having to sit idle while his wife was so busy with the packing. He not only bore the journey well, but truly enjoyed it, and at first seemed decidedly better for the change. But, in one respect, he was a difficult patient to manage, for his active brain always craved the stimulus of social intercourse. He could not resign himself to quiet rest in the open air. Instead, he exhausted his energies by taking long drives, paying visits to one or two cherished friends, and receiving all who called upon him. Before long the final break-down came. Yet during a brief rally just before his death, he spent several hours in explaining to a youthful poet – who was regretting his inability to write sonnets—the whole technique of the difficult art of which he himself was so perfect a master. In fact, his last work was the wreath of sonnets, in memory of his lost child, that only appeared in print after he had been laid to rest beside her in Florence. He died at Villa Pierotti, Bagni di Lucca, on the seventh of September, the day fixed for his return to the home he loved so well.")

=== Analysis ===
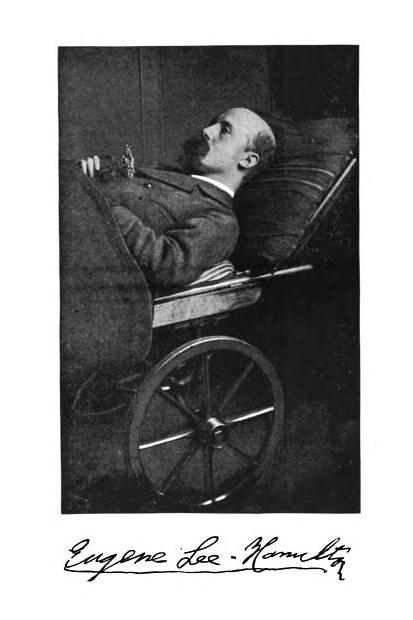
Eugene Lee-Hamilton as a young man

Lee-Hamilton wrote in the tradition of shorter Victorian verse, particularly the dramatic sonnet. Robert Browning was an influence, but Lee-Hamilton refined the art of the dramatic monologue, and there is a restless imagination to his sonnets.

Certain motifs recur, such as submersion in water, being buried in the earth, being shackled, the conflict between body and mind, dark female archetypes such as the gorgon, and male archetypes such as the madman or the murderous lover. Lee-Hamilton has failures when an image or plot that loses force because it lacks restraint. His major works are his sonnets, and his successes depend on technical ability. He condensed the dramatic monologue into a sonnet format, and gained power, in sonnets that are concise and restrained.

Imaginary Sonnets (1888) drew on historical, mythic and imaginary figures: each spoken by a particular person at a definite time. Philip Hobsbaum (in Metre, Rhythm and Verse Form) suggests that Lee-Hamilton's Sonnets of the Wingless Hours (1894) is the only Victorian sonnet sequence that can compare to Gerard Manley Hopkins. In longer poems of collections such as the New Medusa (1882), there are narratives and dramatic monologues that explore the darker side of life; as in Browning, lust, jealousy, and fear predominate.

== Works ==
- Poems and Transcripts (London: William Blackwood, 1878).
- Gods, Saints and Men (London: W Satchell & Co, 1880).
- The New Medusa (London: Eliot Stock, 1882).
- Apollo and Marsyas (London: Eliot Stock, 1884).
- Imaginary Sonnets (London: Elliot Stock, 1888).
- The Fountain of Youth (London: Eliot Stock, 1891).
- Sonnets of the Wingless Hours (London: Eliot Stock, 1894).
- (as translator), The Inferno of Dante (London: Grant Richards, 1898).
- (with his wife) Forest Notes (London: Grant Richards, 1899).
- The Lord of the Dark Red Star (London: The Walter Scott Publishing Co., 1903).
- The Romance of the Fountain (London: T Fisher Unwin, 1905).
- Mimma Bella (London: Heinemann, 1908).

== Bibliography ==
- Dramatic Sonnets, Poems and Ballads: Selections from and Poems of Eugene Lee-Hamilton (London: The Walter Scott Publishing Co., 1903).
- (MacDonald P. Jackson, ed.), Selected Poems of Eugene Lee-Hamilton (1845–1907): A Victorian Craftsman Rediscovered (New York: The Edwin Mellen Press, 2002).
