= A Wicked Voice =

A Wicked Voice by Vernon Lee is a short story about a 19th-century Scandinavian composer named Magnus who, haunted by the ghost of an 18th-century Italian singer named Zaffirino, loses his passion for decadent music and instead comes to realize his true love of classical music.

"A Wicked Voice" is fueled by Lee's love for classical music (18th century Italian opera specifically), her disdain for decadent music (Wagner especially), and her troubled yet obsessive relationship with the past (which assumes the character of a ghost in Zaffirino).

The short story explores themes such as sexuality and eroticism, ghosts of the past, aestheticism, and "art for sanity's sake."

== Background ==
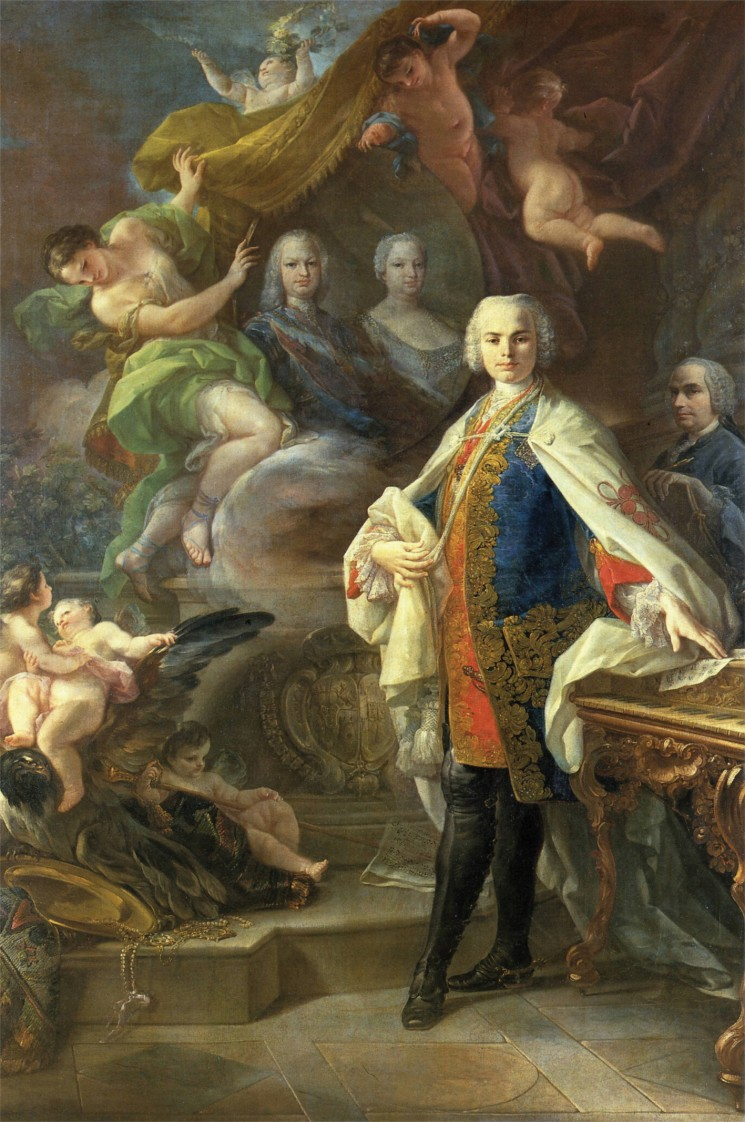
The Portrait of Carlo Broschi called Farinelli (1755)

In "A Wicked Voice" Lee critiques decadent music by showing classical music to be superior. Her critiques of decadent music especially concern Wagner, as they do elsewhere in her other works such as "Beauty and Sanity" and “The Religious and Moral Status of Wagner”. Her musical stance is well-voiced in “Beauty and Sanity” where she wrote, "Wagner's work conveniently serves to exemplify everything dangerous and morbid in modern art, an art that tends to derange the listener's soul. The works of Handel, Gluck, Mozart, or Palestrina, by contrast, exemplify the sanity of an invigorating classicism."

Lee's inspiration for the story began in 1872 when, while at the old Accademia Filarmonica, she became obsessed with a painting of Italian Singer Carlo Broschi, otherwise known as Farinelli (1705–82). Her longing to hear Farinelli's voice inspired her to write a story about him and his singing, which she did two years after her initial encounter with the portrait of him. This story, published later in 1881, was titled “A Culture Ghost: Or, Winthrop's Adventure.” Six years later, the story developed into something new altogether and was published in Les Lettres Et Les Arts under the title of “Voix Maudite.” However, Lee continued to develop Farinelli's story further until, in 1889 the final version of “A Wicked Voice” appeared in her four story collection titled Hauntings.

== Plot summary ==
"A Wicked Voice" by Vernon Lee recounts the tale of a 19th-century composer named Magnus. He is in Venice to compose music for his opera, Ogier the Dane. In Venice, however, his inspiration weakens "in the stagnant lagoon of the past", as the culture and history of Venice confuse his musical ideals: "It was as if there arose out of its shallow waters a miasma of long-dead melodies, which sickened but intoxicated my soul" (208).

He comes across an American etcher, who gifts Magnus an engraving of a famous eighteenth-century singer, Balthasar Cesari, otherwise known as Zaffirino due to "a sapphire engraved with cabalistic signs presented to him one evening by a masked stranger. . . that great cultivator of the human voice, the devil" (199). Magnus becomes obsessed with Zaffirno's painting and finds himself cursed by the singer's voice, which embodies everything he disdains in music.

Magnus describes Zaffirino as attractive and very skilled at singing. His singing attracts the narrator to the point where he finds himself trying to mimic Zaffirino's voice in his own works. This proves detrimental to his career as his own inspirations succumb to Zaffirino's influence. Torn between his own inspirations and those from Zaffirino, Magnus exclaims: “Singer, thing of evil, stupid and wicked slave of the voice... instrument which was not invented by the human intellect." The composer describes Zaffirino's singing as an evil “Beast,” which establishes the composer's notion that the singer's voice is a wicked instrument.

Zaffirino's character shows great pride in his ability to sing, claiming that he can make any woman fall in love with him just by the sound of his voice: “Zaffirino, on his part, was in the habit of boasting that no woman had ever been able to resist his singing." Zaffirino's claims are accredited by another guest at the Venetian boarding-house where Magnus is staying, the Count Alvise, who tells Magnus how Zaffirino killed the Count's own great-aunt, the Procuratessa Vendramin, with the terrible beauty of his voice alone. Magnus finds himself greatly disturbed by both the Count's story and the image of Zaffirino whose “effeminate, fat face of his is almost beautiful, with an odd smile, brazen and cruel," ultimately bringing his work to a halt.

In an attempt to help Magnus, the Count advises him to leave Venice and visit his estate in Mistra. Here, Magnus finds himself in the same room where Zaffirino killed the Count's great-aunt. It is here where Magnus comes to realize what it is he truly seeks: not the calm of inspiration, but the allure of Zaffirino's "wicked voice". Magnus relives the scene of the Procuratessa's death, leaving him on the verge of madness. Ultimately, "wasted by a strange and deadly disease" and dispossessed of his own creative voice Magnus's career comes to an end.

== Themes ==
Following an exploration of the old Accademia Filarmonica with John Singer Sargent in Bologna during the fall of 1872, Lee became “fascinated by a portrait of the great Italian singer Carlo Broschi, called Farinelli” and her “desire to hear again the great castrati of the eighteenth century took on the power of an obsession.” The main themes explored in the text are sexuality and eroticism, the ghosts of the past, aestheticism, and art for “sanity's sake.”

Sexuality and Eroticism

According to Carlo Caballero, the voice and physical attributes of Zaffarino is described with a level of androgyny which lends itself to the homoeroticism in the story. The power that Zaffarino's voice holds over Magnus “seems to spring from a fantasy of sexual inversion” and is “at once blade and wound, Zaffirino's voice fills Magnus with conflicting sensations of dread and desire, but these sensations compel him to hear it again and again.” Additionally, Catherine Maxwell argues that Zaffarino's and Magnus’ homoerotic relationship is a representation of Vernon Lee's own homosexual tendencies and writes that for “lesbian writers the image of the beautiful androgynous boy often stands in for the lesbian woman.”

The Ghosts of the Past

Caballero writes that, “she was haunted by the past” and in her written works, “the past assumes the character of a ghost, an ineffable presence evoked by a place, a song, a picture from long ago.” In the preface to Hauntings (1889), her collection of four short stories, the last being “A Wicked Voice”, she wrote: "That is the thing–the Past, the more or less remote Past, of which the prose is clean obliterated by distance–that is the place to get our ghosts from.”

Aestheticism

In regards to worldly aestheticism, Angela Leighton writes that rather than there being a religious undertone presented or an indulgence of the belief of another world or realm, the author “uses the ghost story to express all the seduction and ambiguity of aestheticism itself." According to Leighton, Lee "clears the way for a story which enjoys the aesthetic possibilities of ghosts" and the "ghostly nature of beauty itself.” Additionally, she writes that Lee's ghosts were "objects of desire rather than fear" and that "they are figures for a beauty as palpable as it is imaginary, as pleasurable as it may be unreal".

Art for Sanity's Sake

According to Caballero, Lee renounced the “doctrine of ‘art for art's sake’” and believed the tradition to be inadequate. Instead, she proposed the doctrine of “art for sanity's sake” which was “founded on an aesthetics of empathy. Lee also claimed that “the serene happiness which beauty gives: happiness, strong and delicate” brought us back “to our consciousness all that which is at once wholesome and rare.” Most of Vernon Lee's written works concerns art, in its "most purely aesthetic art form: music" which is the driving force in "A Wicked Voice."

== Influences ==
In the autumn of 1872, alongside her friend and painter John Singer Sargent, the two came across a portrait of Carlo Broschi, a prominent eighteenth century castrati known by his stage name Farinelli. A year later, Lee would write the story “Winthrop's Adventure”, which similarly tells the story of a castrato and would become the foundation for “A Wicked Voice”. Interpretations of Zaffarino's voice relate back to the story of the sirens, mythical creatures whose voice lures those who hear it, famously told in the Greek epic poem The Odyssey. Magnus's state of paralyzation between paranoia and bliss is evident to that, according to Patricia Pulham. An older definition, as stated by the OED, references a siren to “an imaginary species of serpent”. Scholars refer to the story of Medusa, highlighting her monstrous femininity with connections to Zaffarino's ambiguous gender.

Lee's fascination with music is reverberated throughout her works and most notably in “A Wicked Voice”. Lee in her later work, titled "Studies of the Eighteenth Century", would describe memories of pain and pleasure from her childhood in which her mother would sing and play transcriptions of the newly released eighteenth century songs from Bologna. These memories and experiences of her early childhood are elicited within the text through the castrated voice of Zaffarino.

The opening lines of the text make reference to German composer Richard Wagner, as the protagonist is influenced to create his own opera, Ogier the Dane, based on the creative works of Wagner. Critic Carlo Caballero suggests that Magnus's name is a clever inversion of the first letter of Wagner's name, hinting at the further connection between the two. The site of Wagner's death in 1883, the Ca' Vendramin Calergi, also makes reference to another character within the story, Procuratessa Vendramin. Lee's hostility towards Wagner and his works were well documented, most notably in her work “The Religious and Moral Status of Wagner”. The narrative of "A Wicked Voice" strongly attempts to erase Wagner and the power of his music through the silencing of Magnus's music in the story. Readers are left with the remaining operatic voices of the eighteenth century as the lingering motif. The influence of music on Lee showcases itself with the references not just to Wagner but to many other operatic composers and performers of the eighteenth century (see list).

== Composers/singers referenced ==
- Carlo Broschi (Farinelli)
- Giulio Marco Bordogni
- Girolamo Crescentini
- Gaetano Donizdetti
- Gaetano Guadagni
- George Friedrich Handel
- Robert Schumann
- Gioacchino Rossini
- Richard Wagner
