= Annie E. Holdsworth =

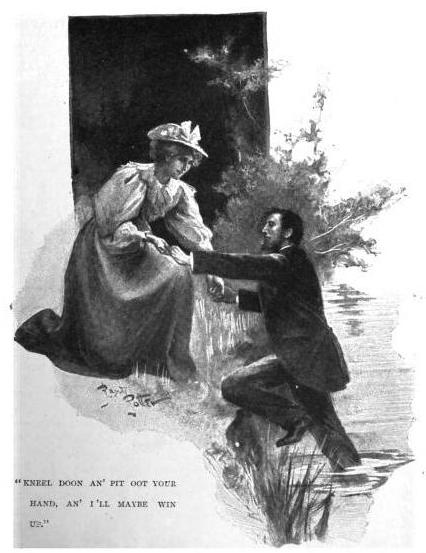
Illustration by Raymond Potter for ""When the Gorse is in Flower" (1897)

Annie E. Holdsworth (1860–1917) was an Anglo-Caribbean novelist; born in Jamaica; daughter of the Reverend William Holdsworth; married Eugene Lee-Hamilton in 1898. She began writing as a girl; came to London on father's death; first worked on the staff of Review of Reviews; became co-editor with Lady Henry Somerset of The Woman's Signal.

== Publications ==
- Joanna Traill, Spinster (1894) William Heinemann, London (Note: The following appeared in Literary world, Volume 25 (1894), Joanna Traill, Spinster "This book, by Annie E. Holdsworth, belongs with that increasing class of fiction written in the interest of social or individual reform. Joanna Traill, middle-aged, unattractive, and hitherto colorless in character, comes into possession of a fortune. Her two married sisters intend to dominate her, as they have always done; but there enters into her life an eccentric philanthropist, Mr. Boas, and its tenor and purpose are at once changed. He brings to her notice a beautiful young girl who had fallen into evil ways and been rescued by him. Joanna adopts and trains her. Her own character develops strong and noble qualities; indeed, the work wrought in herself by self-sacrifice and high endeavor teaches a lesson quite as well worth heeding as that done for the girl, Christine. The subject is a difficult one to manage, but the author has succeeded in showing that an apparently lost life could be saved. Whether the girl was worth the cost is a question that will occur to the reader." (Digitized by Google Books))
- The Years That the Locust Hath Eaten (1895) William Heinemann, London (Note: The following review appeared in The Academy, Vol. 49 (1896): The Years That the Locust Hath Eaten "Miss Annie E. Holdsworth has written a story of conspicuous merit. Its pathos has the true ring about it; its characters are real; its subject-matter has been derived from life. It tells the story of struggling persons belonging to the artistic professions who live at Regent's-Buildings near the Euston-road. They are poor and shabby; the good things of this world are not theirs, but their hearts are of gold. The heroine, Priscilla Momerie, is a beautiful girl, possessing undeveloped powers akin to genius. She is mated to a selfish, vain creature, who thinks himself a genius. He dreams all day of the work he is going to give to the world; but he does nothing. He can talk though, and talk brilliantly, and he manages to impress the outside world in his favour. There is one, however, Stephen Maiden, a young painter, who sees through the fraud, and estimates this bombast at its true worth. He pities and loves the girl-wife, but honourably keeps his own counsel. Priscilla has real literary ability, though her husband ignores it, and permits her to scrub, pot-boil, and kill herself to provide the bare necessities of life. Gertrude Tennant, a young girl singer, has also a keen perception of the true state of the case as regards Momerie and his wife. She loves Maiden; and, before Priscilla'a beauty and suffering came between them, he had lovd her. Gertrude is too large and also too moral to take advantage of Priscilla. She loves the unhappy wife, and forgives her for having unwittingly stepped between her and the man who could have made her happy. In course of time Priscilla knows that she is to have the solace which alone can make recompense to a woman unsatisfactorily mated. She increases her exertions that she may be able to support the child, and that it may not suffer vicariously. She tries to keep bright and happy, hoping that her baby may be blessed with a merry heart. But it is of no avail; the child is born weak and sickly, and Momerie resents its birth. Priscilla adores it, and for her sake Maiden also loves it. Soon the husband's constitutional weakness ends in paralysis. His slothful nature induces him to accept the affliction complacently; he can now see his wife toil and slave free from reproach. Morally he becomes the murderer of his own child. The way of this is told admirably. Indeed, the story throughout is an excellent piece of narrative, and its characterisation is distinctly above the average. Miss Holdsworth is original and capable, and she has written a notable novel." (Digitized by Google Books))
- Spindles and Oars (1896) Ward, Locke & Co., Ltd., London (Note: The following review appeared in The Speaker, Vol. 15 (1897), Spindles and Oars "The curious title of "Spindles and Oars" is explained by the fact that the book deals with life in a Scottish village whose population is composed entirely of fishermen and weavers. Skyrle is the name of this remote nook, and the simple annals of its toiling inhabitants are here set forth in a series of short sketches, more or less connected by a slight thread of narrative. Miss Holdsworth has caught with admirable success the peculiar atmosphere of Scottish life among the labouring classes, and the volume is rich in local colour. It is, indeed, altogether a charming book, full of kindly humour, shrewd touches of characterisation, and gentle pathos, while the style is both simple and vivid. There is nothing very novel or striking in "Spindles and Oars," because the manners and customs of the northern peasantry have already been exhaustively catalogued by more powerful pens than Miss Holdsworth's; but the inevitable lack of originality is atoned for by the pleasant sense of humour which animates this agreeable book, and lends to all its varied characters an air of truth and nature. There are seventeen distinct sketches in "Spindles and Oars," of which all are meritorious, and some delightful; for Miss Holdsworth has the gift of that delicate intuition which can invest with dignity and interest the humblest affairs of life by its sympathetic touch. These little sketches are too slight to bear a detailed critical analysis, for their charm – and it is a very real one – lies in atmosphere and setting rather than in striking incident or witty dialogue. But the quiet merits of such a book deserve praise all the more because of the welcome relief it affords from the spurious psychological novel of the day. All lovers of pure and wholesome literature must appreciate the tonic influence exercised by Miss Holdsworth in this beautifully sympathetic volume." (Digitized by Google Books))
- The Gods Arrive (1898) William Heinemann, London
- Forest Notes (in collaboration with her husband)
- The Valley of the Great Shadow (1899) William Heinemann, London
- Great Lowlands (1901)
- Michael Ross, Minister (1902) Dodd, Mead & Company, New York
- A New Paolo and Francesca (1904) John Lane, London
- The Iron Gates (1906)
- Lady Letty Brandon (1909) John Long, London
- "Peace" and "In the Shadow of His Hand Hath He Hid Me" (1880) in The Christian Miscellany, and Family Visitor, Wesleyan Conference Office, London
- "A Study in Oak" (1886) in Belgravia, Vol. 60, An illustrated magazine, Chatto & Windus, London
- "When the Gorse is in Flower" (1897) in The English illustrated magazine, Volume 16, The Illustrated London News, Ltd., London
