= Edward Hamlyn Adams =

British lawyer, slave contractor and politician (1777–1842)

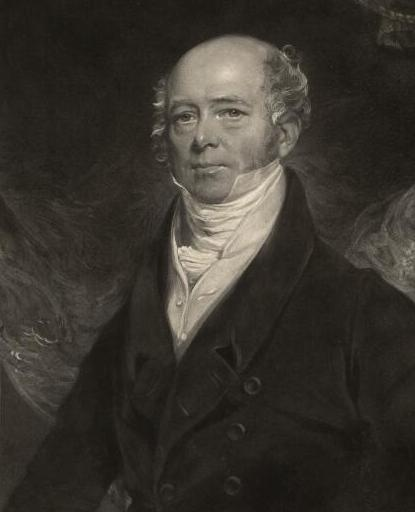
- Adams c. 1842

Member of Parliament for Carmarthenshire
- In office 1832–1834 Serving with George Rice-Trevor

Personal details
- Born: 30 April 1777 Kingston, Colony of Jamaica
- Died: 30 May 1842 (aged 65) Middleton Hall Estate, Llanarthne, Carmarthenshire, UKGBI
- Spouse: Amelia Sophia (m. 1796)
- Children: 5
- Relatives: Edward Abadam (son); Violet Paget (granddaughter); Eugene Lee-Hamilton (grandson); Alice Abadam (granddaughter)
- Profession: Lawyer; slave contractor

Edward Hamlyn Adams (Note: Also cited as Edward Hamlin Adams.) (30 April 1777 – 30 May 1842) was a British lawyer, slave contractor and politician.

== Early life ==
Adams was born on 30 April 1777 in Kingston, Colony of Jamaica (present-day Jamaica) to William Adams and Elizabeth Anne Adams (née Coxeter). Adams had at least one older brother who died during childhood. Educated in England, Adams returned to Jamaica to study law.

== Career ==
In 1807, Adams became a partner at the counting house in Atkinson, Mure, and Boyle. Owned by Alexander Lindsay, 6th Earl of Balcarres, Adams contracted slave-labour on behalf of the Earl to both the army and the civil government in Jamaica. Later entering into a business partnership with Robert Robertson, Adams contracted enslaved people into the Army. Adams also managed the coffee plantations of the 6th Earl of Balcarres in his absence.

In 1824, Adams purchased the Middleton Hall Estate (present-day site of the National Botanic Garden of Wales) in Llanarthne. A Justice of the peace for Carmarthenshire, Adams served as the High Sheriff of Carmarthenshire in 1831. From 1832 to 1834, Adams was a member of Parliament for Carmarthenshire. Adams purchased the 'Lord Nelson' inn (present-day 'Abadam Arms') in Porthyrhyd, Carmarthenshire, which was attacked in the Rebecca Riots.

== Personal life ==
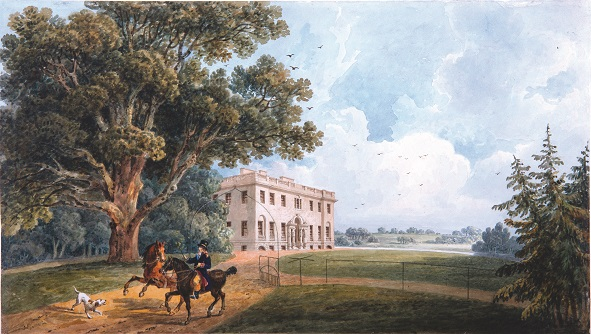
An 1815 painting of Middleton Hall

In 1796, Adams married Amelia Sophia Adams (née MacPherson) with whom he had five children. Adams was the grandfather of Eugene Lee-Hamilton, Vernon Lee and Alice Abadam.

On 30 May 1842, Adams died at Middleton Hall Estate aged 65.

== Notes ==
Parliament of the United Kingdom
Preceded by Sir James Hamlyn-Williams, Bt.	Member of Parliament for Carmarthenshire; 1832 – 1835; With: George Rice-Trevor (Representation increased to two members by the Great Reform Act)	Succeeded by George Rice-Trevor; Sir James Hamlyn-Williams, Bt.
