= National Botanic Garden of Wales =

Botanical garden in Llanarthney, Carmarthenshire, Wales

Coordinates: 51°50′15″N 4°09′06″W

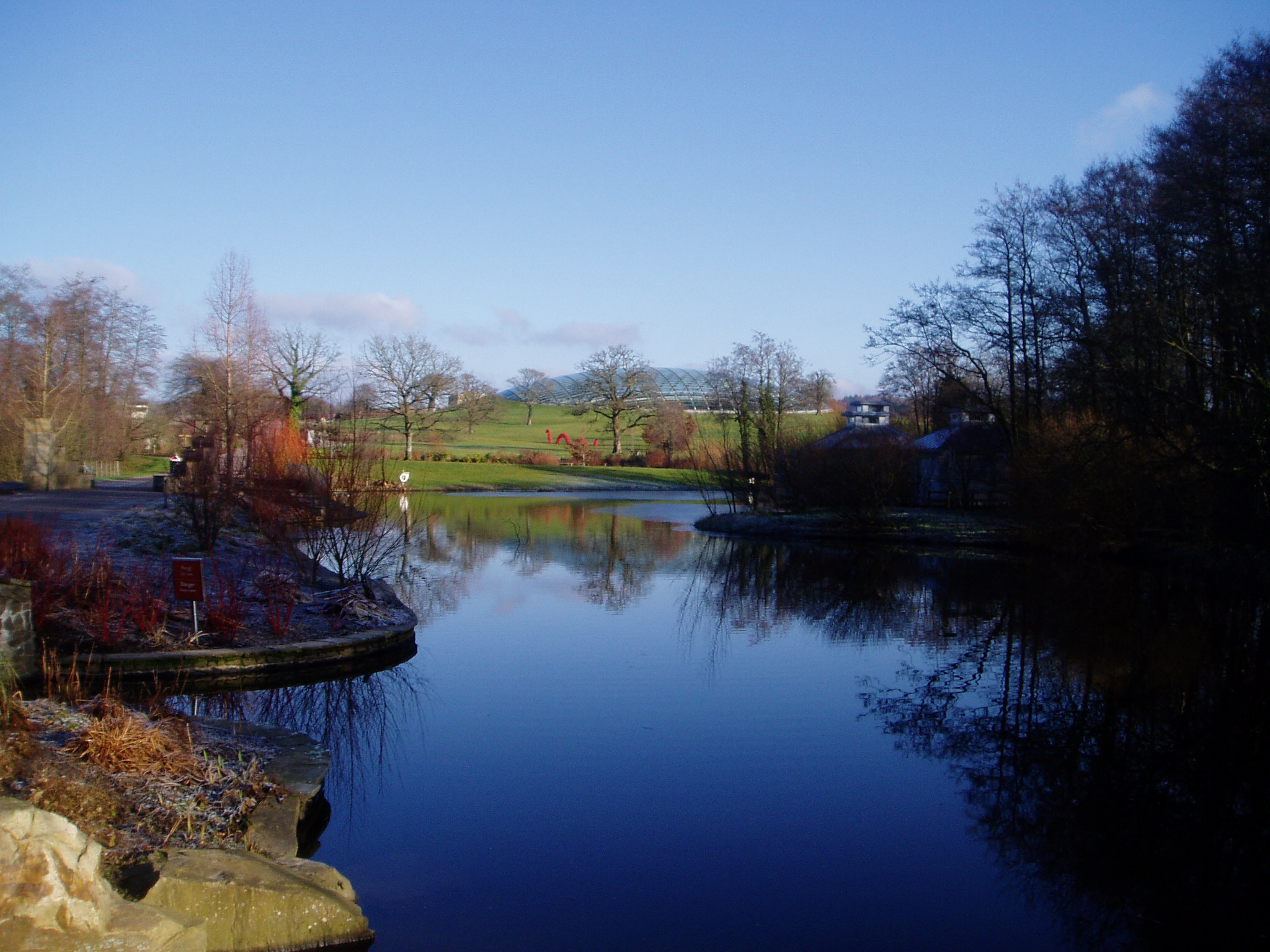
National Botanic Garden of Wales

The National Botanic Garden of Wales (Welsh: Gardd Fotaneg Genedlaethol Cymru) is a botanical garden located in Llanarthney in the River Tywi valley, Carmarthenshire, Wales. The garden is both a visitor attraction and a centre for botanical research and conservation, and features the world's largest single-span glasshouse, measuring 110 m (360 ft) long by 60 m (200 ft) wide.

The National Botanic Garden of Wales seeks "to develop a viable world-class national botanic garden dedicated to the research and conservation of biodiversity, lifelong learning and the enjoyment of the visitor." The garden is a registered charity reliant upon funding from visitors, friends, grants and gifts. Significant start-up costs were shared with the UK Millennium Fund.

== History of the site ==
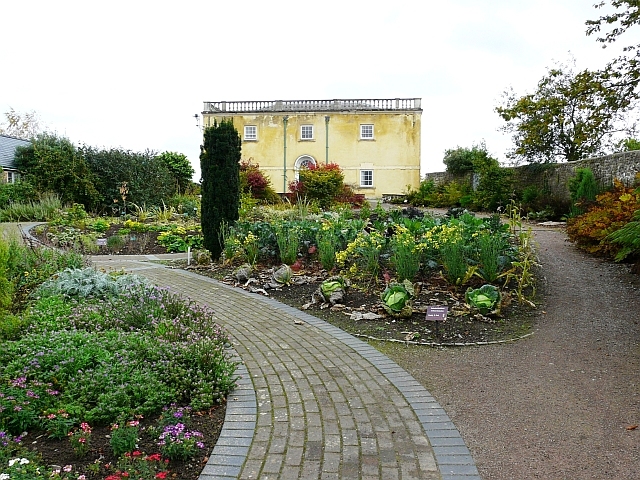
View through the restored Wallace Garden towards the Paxton-built Principality House. The garden features a bronze bust of Alfred Russel Wallace by the sculptor Anthony Smith.

The Middleton family built a mansion in the early 17th century. In 1789 Sir William Paxton bought the estate for £40,000 to create a water park. He used his wealth to employ experts during his lifetime, including the eminent architect Samuel Pepys Cockerell, whom he commissioned to design and build a new Middleton Hall, turning the original one into a farm. The new Middleton Hall became ‘one of the most splendid mansions in South Wales’, which ‘far eclipsed the proudest of the Cambrian mansions in Asiatic pomp and splendour’.

Paxton created a water park. Water flowed around the estate via a system of interconnecting lakes, ponds and streams linked by a network of dams, water sluices, bridges and cascades. Spring water was stored in elevated reservoirs that fed into a lead cistern on the mansion's roof, allowing Paxton's residence to enjoy piped running water and the very latest luxury, water closets. The park, which includes the National Botanical Garden, is registered, under Middleton Hall, at Grade II* on the Cadw/ICOMOS Register of Parks and Gardens of Special Historic Interest in Wales.

In 1806, Paxton engaged Pepys Cockerell again to design and then oversee the construction of Paxton's Tower on the estate, which was completed in 1809. A Neo-Gothic folly erected in honour of Lord Nelson, it is situated on a hilltop near Llanarthney in the Towy Valley. Today the folly is now owned by the National Trust.

By the time of Paxton's death in 1824, Middleton Hall estate covered some 2,650 acres (1,070 ha). The sale agents engaged that year described the estate thus in their catalogue:

Richly ornamented by nature, and greatly improved by art. A beautiful tower erected to the memory of the noble hero the late Lord Nelson, forming a grand and prominent feature in the Property and a Land Mark in the County, opposite to which are the Ruins of Dryslwyn Castle, and the Grongar Hills, with the Towey winding to a great extent, presenting a scenery that may vie with any County. As to local amenities, the Roads are excellent, a good Neighborhood, and Country abounding with highly Picturesque Scenery

Middleton Hall estate was sold to Jamaican-born West India merchant, Edward Hamlin Adams, for £54,700. Adams, neither a gardener nor a lover of water features, added buildings that aided his love of country sports, but let the bath houses fall into disrepair. Of the gardens, only those immediately visible from the house were maintained.

In 1842 the estate passed into the hands of his eccentric son Edward, who immediately changed his name from Adams into the Welsh form Abadam. Not loving the country or gardens, according to his estate manager Thomas Cooke, Edward was a social nightmare. As his son predeceased him, on his death in 1875 the estate passed to his eldest daughter, Lucy, then next sister Adah who had married into the local Hughes family. In 1919 the estate changed hands again when Major William J. H. Hughes sold it to Colonel William N. Jones.

Edward Abadam's youngest daughter, Alice, was a leading suffragist, and a blue plaque to her was unveiled in 2018, the centenary of women's suffrage, in the gardens of what had been Middleton Hall, her childhood home, by her great-niece Margaret Vaughan.

In 1931, the mansion was completely gutted by fire, leaving only the walls standing, themselves covered in globules of molten lead from the melted roof. After this the estate fell into decline, and 20 years later the walls of the main house were pulled down. The site was then bought by Carmarthenshire County Council, and leased to young farmers hoping to make their way into an agricultural career. A tree on the site, known as the Llanarthne oak, was almost cut down at this time during the clearance of a paddock on one of the farms. It survived and in 2016 was named as Wales's Tree of the Year.

== History of the garden ==
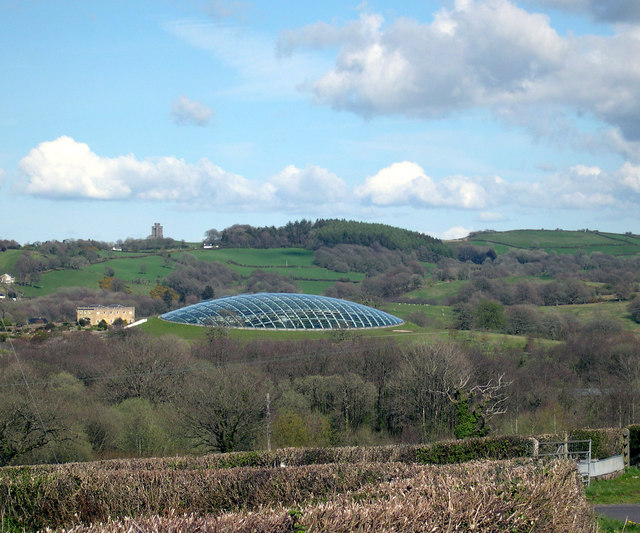
View over the Great Glasshouse at the National Botanic Garden of Wales, towards Paxton's Tower

The Great Glasshouse at National Botanic Garden of Wales

In 1978, interest had been captured by local walkers, who were keen to revive the splendour of what they could see around them. Setting up a fund raising scheme, the little money raised led to the rediscovery of a number of historical features.

Virtually on the site of Cockerell's mansion, the Great Glasshouse now forms the centrepiece. Much of the original waterscape has been restored, and extended by introducing cascades to the western approach to the Glasshouse. The extraordinary original view the east side of the mansion offered over the grounds has been restored, extending as originally to Paxton's Tower in the distance. Many experts have commented that this view gives visitors an ability to see and hence understand something of what the great landscape architects of the end of the eighteenth century understood by the word "picturesque".

The garden was opened to the public for the first time on 24 May 2000, and was officially opened on 21 July by Charles, Prince of Wales. Foster and Partners won the Gold Medal for Architecture at the National Eisteddfod of Wales of 2000 for their work on the Great Glasshouse. In 2003, the garden ran into serious financial difficulties, and in 2004 it accepted a financial package from the Welsh Assembly Government, Carmarthenshire County Council and the Millennium Commission to secure its future.

The site extends to 568 acres (2.30 km^{2}), and among the garden's rare and threatened plants is the whitebeam Sorbus leyana. Twenty-first century approaches to recycling and conservation have been used in the design of the centre: biomass recycling is used to provide heating for some of the facilities such as the visitor centre and glasshouses.

With many plant exhibits now fully mature, and exhibits and activities to attract younger visitors, three quarters of income is now self-generated, with the remaining quarter in grants. In 2019, there were 160,000 visitors, quoted as being a "sustainable average".

== Botanical collections ==
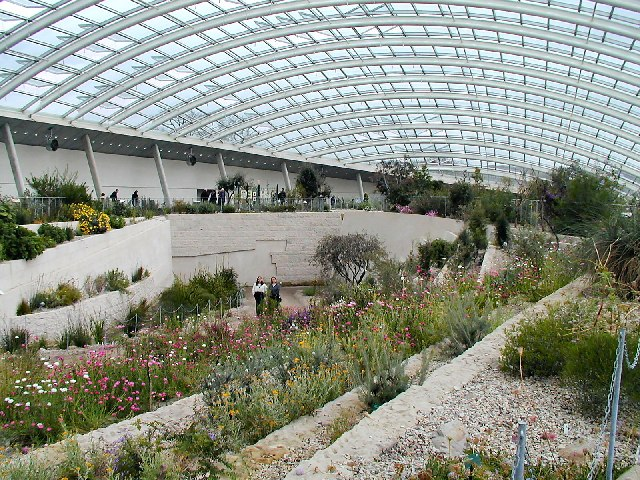
Inside the Great Glasshouse, designed by Foster and Partners.

Constructed virtually on the same site as Paxton's new but now demolished Middleton Hall, the Great Glasshouse, designed by Foster and Partners, is the largest structure of its kind in the world. The structure is 95 m (312 ft) long and 55 m (180 ft) wide, with a roof containing 785 panes of glass. Housing plants from several Mediterranean climate regions, the plants are divided into sections from Chile, Western Australia, South Africa, California, the Canary Islands and the Mediterranean itself.

The Double Walled Garden has been rebuilt from the ruins, and is being developed to house a wide variety of plants, including a modern interpretation of a kitchen garden in one quarter, and ornamental beds to display the classification and evolution of all flowering plant families in the other three quarters.

In 2007, a new tropical glasshouse, designed by Welsh architect John Belle, was opened to continue the classification displays with tropical monocotyledons.

In 2015 a large collection of Welsh apple varieties was planted. A Welsh pomona (annotated survey) is planned.

== Waun Las national nature reserve ==
The Waun Las national nature reserve is accessed from the garden and comprises some 150 hectares (370 acres) of wildflower meadows and pastures.

== Use in television ==
The domed greenhouse scenes of the Doctor Who episode The Waters of Mars (2009), were filmed in the glasshouse of the garden.

== See also ==
- List of gardens in Wales
- Tourism in Wales
