= Alice Abadam =

Welsh suffragist, Catholic campaigner (1856–1940)

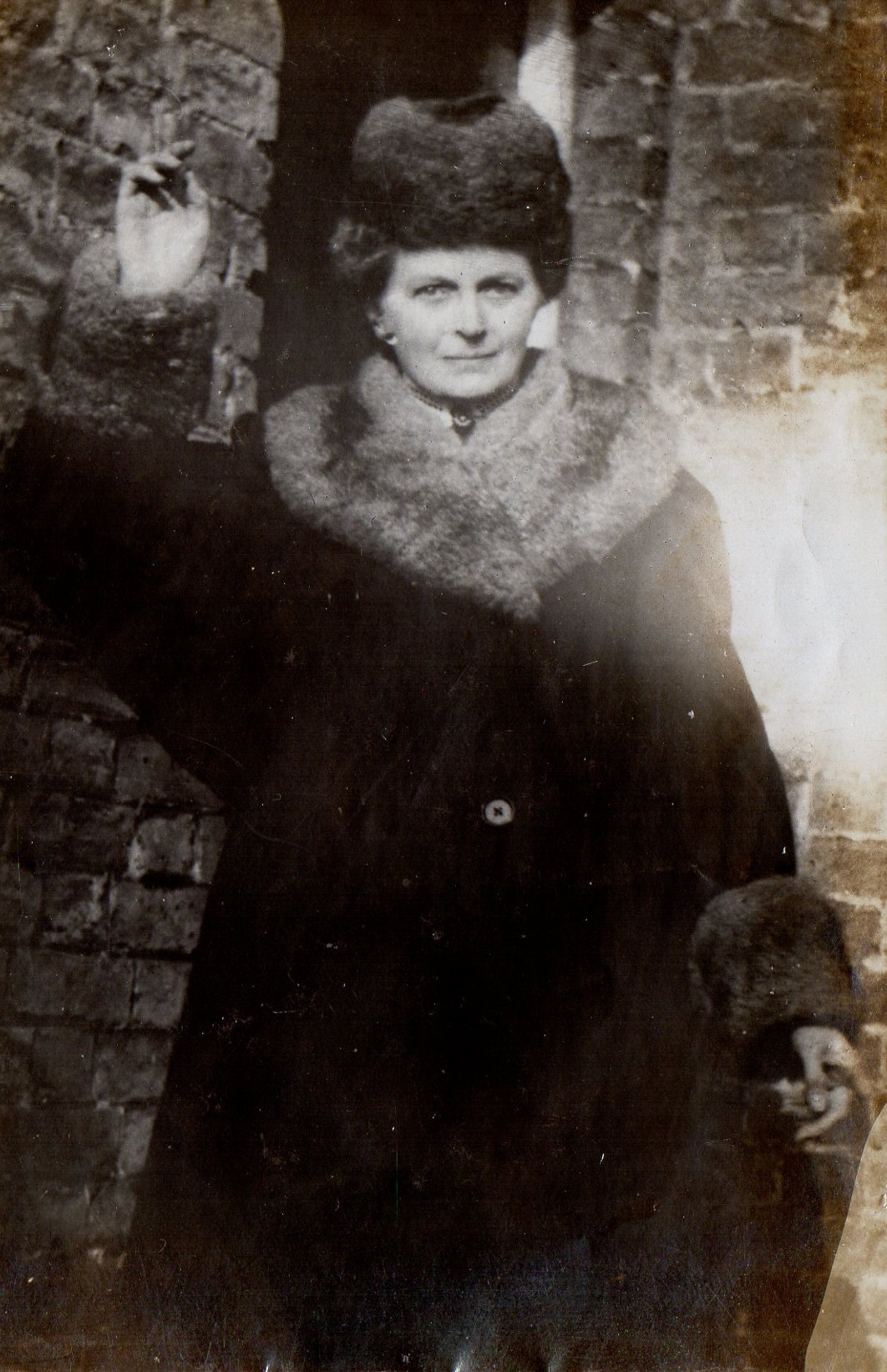
- Born: 2 January 1856; St John's Wood, London, England
- Died: 31 March 1940 (aged 84); Abergwili, Carmarthen, Wales
- Organization(s): Central Society for Women's Suffrage; Women's Social and Political Union; Norwood and District Women's Suffrage Society; Women's Freedom League; Catholic Women's Suffrage Society; Feminist League
- Political party: Independent Labour Party
- Partner: Alice Vowe Johnson: (1901 – died 1938)
- Father: Edward Abadam
- Relatives: Edward Hamlyn Adams (grandfather); Vernon Lee (cousin); Eugene Lee-Hamilton (cousin)

Alice Abadam (2 January 1856 – 31 March 1940) was a Welsh suffragist, women's rights campaigner and feminist.

== Early life ==
Alice Abadam was born on 2 January 1856 in St John's Wood, London to Edward Abadam, the former High Sheriff of Carmarthenshire, and Louisa Abadam (née Taylor; 1828–1886). The paternal granddaughter of Edward Hamlyn Adams, a lawyer, slave contractor and politician, Abadam's father inherited Middleton Hall (the site of the National Botanic Garden of Wales) in 1842 and subsequently added the Welsh Patronymic "Ab" to the family name.

The youngest of seven children, Abadam grew up at Middleton Hall in Llanarthne. Abadam was the cousin of Vernon Lee, an art historian and writer, and Eugene Lee-Hamilton, a poet.

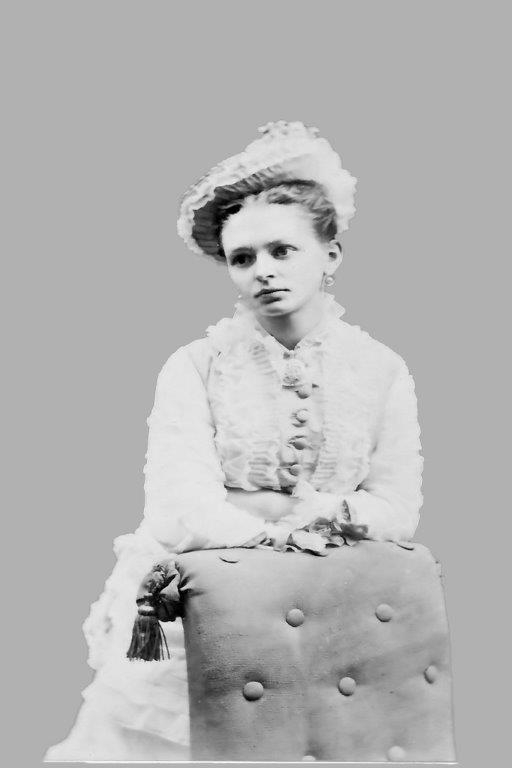
Alice Abadam as a bridesmaid

Abadam, by her own account, had a happy childhood and was educated by a governess at Middleton Hall. She saw little of her mother who suffered ill-health brought about by post-natal depression. By 1861 her mother was living away from the family in Brighton, and in 1871 was living back at her paternal home in Dorset. Despite living apart, her parents remained married until the death of Edward in 1875.

Her father held anti-clerical views, but Abadam converted to Catholicism in 1880 as a result of the Oxford Movement.

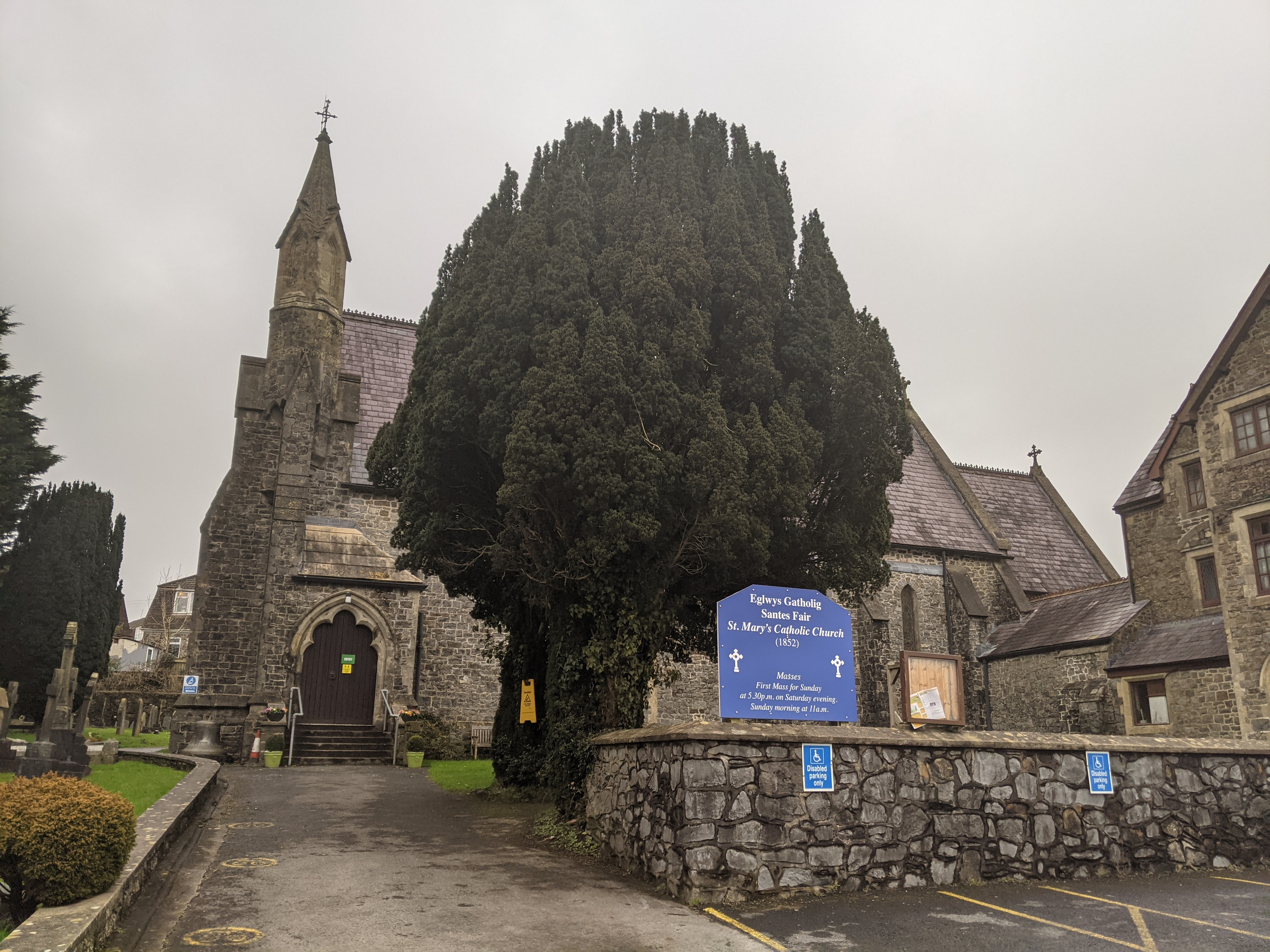
Roman Catholic Church of St Mary, Carmarthen

A musical upbringing led her to becoming the organist and choir master at St Mary's Church on Union Street, in Carmarthen. Abadam met Alice Vowe Johnson, a doctor and surgeon, when she was medical officer at Carmarthen's Asylum and they were companions for the rest of their lives.

== Work as a suffragette ==
In 1905 Abadam joined the Central Society for Women's Suffrage. She became a well known speaker and she addressed a number of suffrage societies, including a two-week speaking tour around Birmingham in 1908, and other areas in "the North". She often travelled by bicycle and sketched her experiences.

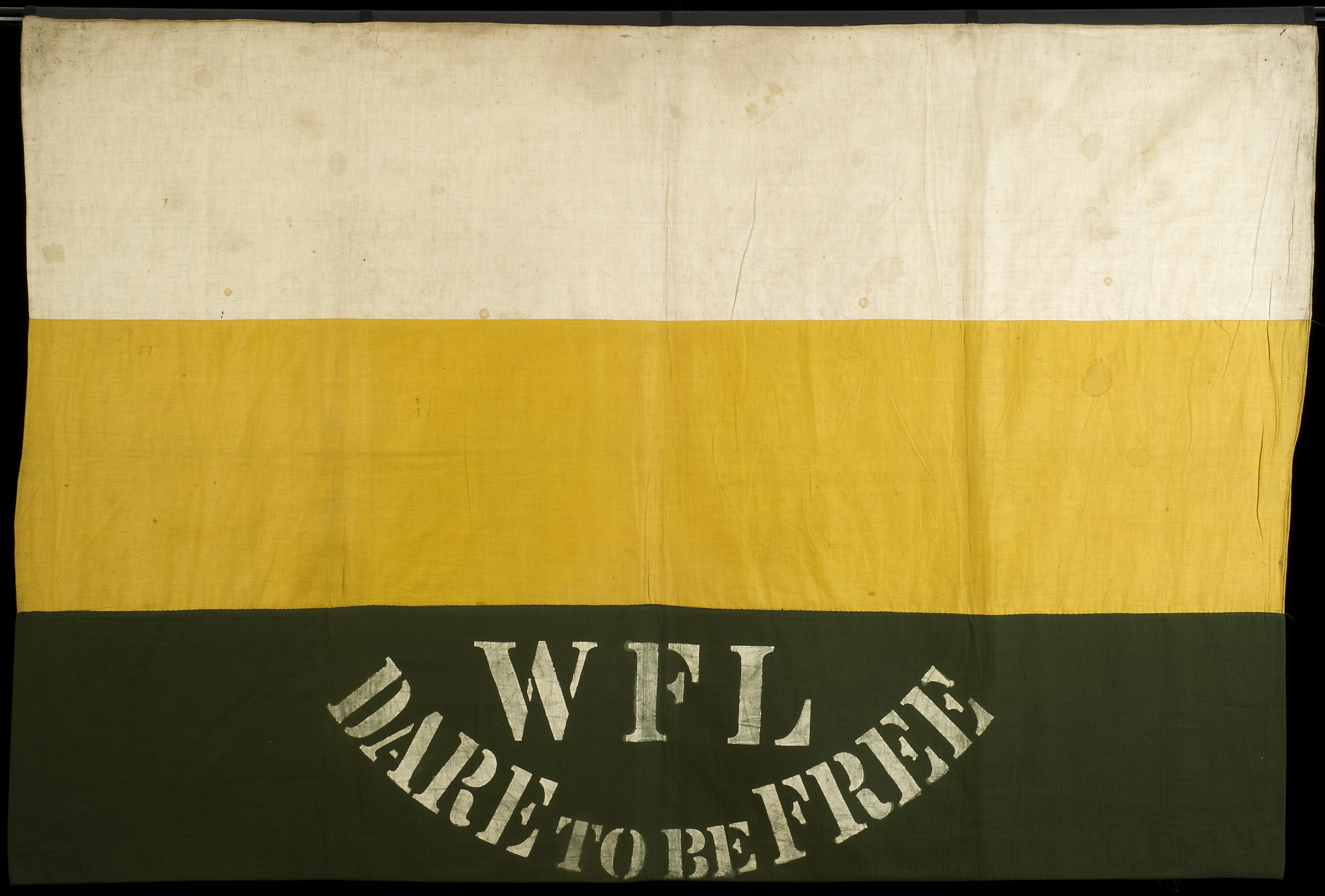
Women's Freedom League (WFL) colours and motto 1908. Original in LSE Library

Abadam had subscribed as an "independent socialist" to the Women's Social and Political Union (WSPU) and Independent Labour Party manifesto in the 1906 elections, and in 1911, the WSPU newspaper Votes for Women called Abadam "that well known speaker on social issues". She attended the Savoy Hotel dinner for the release of WSPU prisoners in 1906, but had moved away from the militant movement the following year. Abadam was one of the signatories (including, among others Edith How Martyn, Charlotte Despard, Theresa Billington-Greig, Marion Coates-Hansen, and Irene Miller) to a letter to Emmeline Pankhurst explaining their disquiet on 14 September 1907, and establishing the alternative Women's Freedom League (WFL).

Abadam took part in a suffragist cycle tour of the north in 1908 and recorded it in watercolour drawings including one of a policeman stating "you are free to hold your meeting... but the last lady to speak in Carlisle was Mary Queen of Scots, and then she went south and was beheaded!".

Abadam became president first of the Beckenham London Society for Women's Suffrage (now the Fawcett Society) in 1908, then the Norwood and District Women's Suffrage Society in 1913.

In 1911, Abadam spoke on "How the Vote will affect the White Slave Traffic" to the Mansfield National Union of Women's Suffrage Societies, and in the same year when the Catholic Women's Suffrage Society formed, she urged Catholic women to move from local or small charitable works to make join suffrage campaigns to "influence the lives of millions of their poor and unprotected sisters for the good".

In Norwich in August 1912, speaking for an hour and quarter, Adadam appealed directly to the Catholic clergy not to abuse their power by promoting 'indifference and uninformed opposition' to women's suffrage, as reported in The Tablet, a Catholic newsletter. Her outspokenness and open criticism of clergy, including Father Henry Day, who opposed votes for women, led to a label for Abadam as "arrogant" and "paranoid" and her followers were called "Abadamites'" in another Catholic publication, Universe. Alice Meynell wrote supportively in The Tablet, "A Tribute to Miss Abadam".

In Plymouth in 1913, Adadam placed a motion at the Catholic Women's Suffrage Society, that this meeting "calls upon the Government to extend the Parliamentary franchise to women in the interests of justice, morality and religion".

In a 1913 pamphlet, "The Feminist Vote, Enfranchised or Emancipated?", Abadam wrote more generally on women's rights, that "The Constructive Feminist has to be no man's shadow. She must be herself – free to the very soul of sex servility. So, and only so, can she save a stricken world".

Abadam hosted a table including Evelina Haverfield and members of the Actresses' Franchise League (AFL) and the Women Writer's Suffrage League (WWSL) at the Hotel Cecil costume dinner in 1914.

By 1916, Abadam was chair of the Federated Council of Suffrage Councils.

In 1920, she founded the Feminist League with a wide debating agenda and lending library on topics related to feminism but also including freemasonry, embryology and witches.

In the 1920s the Catholic Women's Suffrage Society (which had become the St. Joan's International Alliance) promoted the Equal Franchise Bill and celebrated its passing into law in 1928, with a Mass in Westminster Cathedral and a procession of Protestant and Catholic suffragists including Millicent Fawcett, Charlotte Despard, Virginia Crawford, Elisabeth Christitch, Leonara di Alberti, and Abadam (then aged 72).

== Later life ==
Abadam was involved in supporting a Breton order of White Sister nuns escape persecution and settle in Wales. Abadam served on a committee for art at the University of Wales later in her life.

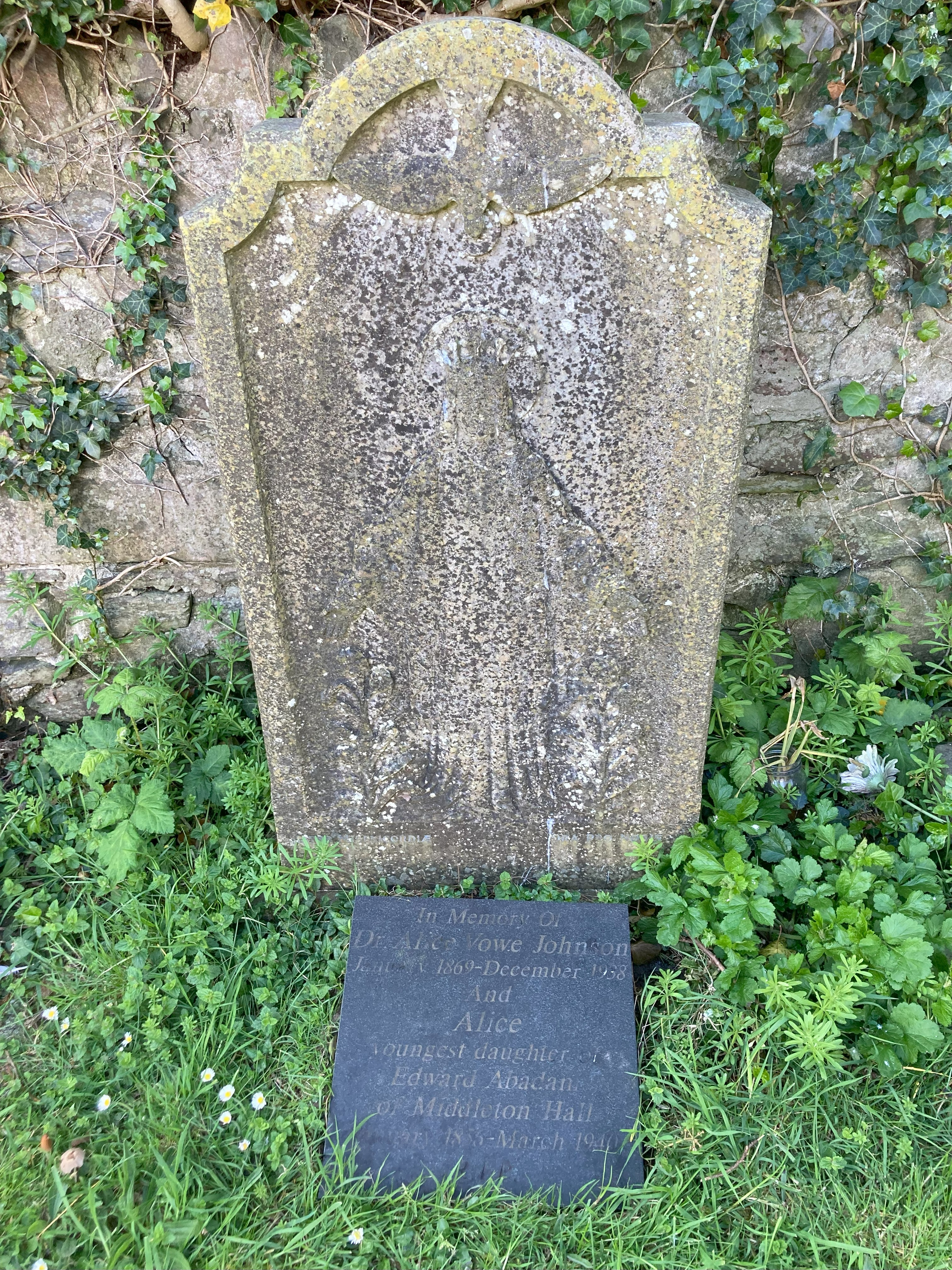
Graves and memorial stone of Dr Alice Vowe Johnson and Alice Abadam in graveyard of St. Mary's Catholic Church, Carmarthen

Following Alice Johnson's death in 1939, Abadam returned to Wales and lived with her nephew Ryle Morris, son of her sister Edith, at Bryn Myrddin in Abergwilii, just outside Carmarthen. She died there on 31 March 1940 and was described as "a very interesting, talented and remarkable personality" in her obituary in the Carmarthen Journal.

== Legacy and commemoration ==
Abadam left her money to her niece, Mary Edith Morris. Abadam also left an education legacy to pay for boarding school for her great niece Margaret Vaughan, who was four years old at her death. Abadam and Alice Vowe Johnson were buried together in St. Mary's Church graveyard in Carmarthen.

At the centenary of some women gaining the right to vote under the Representation of the People Act 1918, Vaughan described her family's admiration for Abadam, stating that she regarded her as incredibly clever and considered her a major personal benefactor. Vaughan also said that she owns a collection of Abadam's paintings. She further noted that her daughter possesses a glass inscribed with the slogan Votes for Women.

Some of Abadam's own sketches are published on the website The Sybil.

Abadam was recognised by the Women's Archive Wales as a feminist, suffragist, orator and author. A blue plaque at 26 Picton Terrace, Carmarthen, Abadam's home from 1886 to 1904 and at the National Botanical Garden of Wales Llanarthney on the site of her childhood home, the former Middleton Hall, were unveiled on 24 November 2018 by Abadam's great-niece Margaret Vaughan, who ensures that her family's memories of suffragist Abadam lives on. The commemoration formed part of a conference A Celebration of the Women of Middleton and the estates of Wales.

Abadam's papers are held at the Women's Library at the London School of Economics, donated by Vaughan in 2006.
