= The Suffragette Fellowship =

Fellowship for those involved in the UK movement for women's suffrage

The Suffragette Fellowship (from 1931)
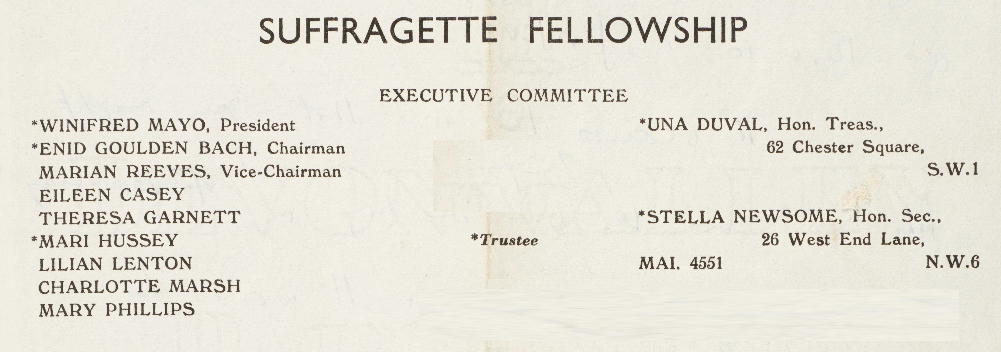
- a 1951 letterhead
- Formation: 1926 (as The Suffragette Club)
- Founders: Edith How-Martyn
- Dissolved: 1971
- Purpose: 'to perpetuate the memory of the pioneers and outstanding events, connected with women's emancipation and especially the militant suffrage campaign 1905-1914'
- Methods: newsletter, commemorative events, public art
- Key people: Edith How-Martyn, Stella Newsome, Marian Reeves, Una Duval
- Parent organisation: Women's Social and Political Union
- Formerly called: The Suffragette Club

The Suffragette Fellowship was an organisation founded in 1926 by Edith How-Martyn with the purpose of preserving the memory of the women's suffrage movement in the United Kingdom, particularly the militant campaign led by the Women's Social and Political Union (WSPU) between 1905 and 1914. The Fellowship aimed to ensure that the history and contributions of suffragettes remained recognised and celebrated.

== History ==
Initially established as the Suffragette Club, the organisation was created "to perpetuate the memory of the pioneers and outstanding events connected with women's emancipation and especially with the militant suffrage campaign 1905-1914, and thus keep alive the suffragette spirit". Membership was originally open to suffragette prisoners, members of militant suffrage societies, and direct descendants of suffragette activists. Over time, its mission expanded to include securing women's political, civil, economic, educational, and social rights on the basis of gender equality.

The Suffragette Fellowship held an annual program of commemorations, including the birthday of Emmeline Pankhurst (14 July), the first militant protest (13 October 1905), and suffrage victories of 1918 and 1928. The organisation also published a newsletter, Calling All Women, from 1947 until 1971, which documented the Fellowship's activities and the legacy of the suffrage movement.

== Collection and legacy ==
The Suffragette Fellowship Collection, housed at the Museum of London, includes books, pamphlets, periodicals, photographs, press cuttings, personal papers, textiles (including banners), and objects associated with the suffrage campaign. The collection provides significant insight into the early 20th-century women's rights movement, with a particular focus on the WSPU

In 1950, the Fellowship formally transferred its archive to the London Museum (now part of the Museum of London), ensuring the preservation of materials related to the struggle for women's enfranchisement.

== Activities and influence ==
The Fellowship maintained strong links with former suffrage campaigners, including Annie Kenney, Stella Newsome, Marian Reeves, Enid and Sybil Goulden-Bach (nieces of Emmeline Pankhurst), Teresa Billington-Greig, and Una Dugdale Duval.

The Suffragette Memorial is a sculpture commissioned by the Suffragette Fellowship, which commemorates those who fought for women's suffrage in the United Kingdom, in the north-west corner of Christchurch Gardens, Victoria, London. The 1970 unveiling was attended by a number of surviving suffragettes, including the Fellowship's then president Grace Roe and Edith Clayton Pepper, Leonora Cohen and Lilian Lenton. The sculpture is located in the north-west corner of Christchurch Gardens, Victoria, London.

The Suffragette Fellowship marked the house, 2 Camden Hill Square, Holland Park, of former militant suffragette Georgina Brackenbury, with a plaque stating "The Brackenbury trio were so whole-hearted and helpful during all the early strenuously years of the militant suffrage movement. We remember them with honour." On Brackenbury's death, she had left the home to a group providing clubs and hostel accommodation for women over thirty (the Over Thirties Association, founded 1934).
