= Stella Newsome =

British women's activist (1889–1969)

- Born: 28 July 1889; Leicester, England
- Died: 11 November 1969 (aged 80); West Hampstead, England
- Occupation: Women's rights activist
- Known for: De facto archivist of the Suffragette Fellowship

Stella Winifred Newsome (28 July 1889 – 11 November 1969) was a British teacher and suffragette who was active in the Women's Freedom League. She wrote the WFL's history and she was the de facto archivist of the Suffragette Fellowship which was an organisation of those who had been involved in the 1905 to 1914 militant campaign for women to have the vote in Britain.

== Life ==
Newsome was born in Leicester. Her mother was Caroline Louisa Rice ad her father, George Newsome, was a grocer. She became a teacher. Her father died in 1909 and two years later she joined the Women's Social and Political Union (WSPU). Margaret West was the WSPU organiser it Leicester and Newsome would carry out vandalism of golf courses and letter boxes to gain attention for the suffragette's cause.

In 1914 the WSPU effectively disbanded as the government released all prisoners and the Pankhursts agreed that their followers should get behind the war effort. Newsome disagreed with what she saw as Christabel Pankhurst's jingoistic leadership. In 1916 she was in London and may have worked with the United Suffragists before she joined the Women's Freedom League and became the secretary to the WFL's central branch in London.

In 1918 some British women were given the vote but this was not equality. Equality would also include pay and she campaigned for teachers to be equally paid irrespective of gender. She was involved in giving talks to groups prior to the protest by the National Federation of Women Teachers in November 1920.

In 1921 Lady Rhondda founded the Six Point Group to campaign for wider equality. Newsome served on the group's executive committee.

The "Suffragette Club" by Edith How-Martyn in 1926 to "keep alive the suffragette spirit" and to remember the campaign that ran from 1905 to 1914. Newsome became involved with this group after the Second World War and she became its secretary and the de facto archivist. The group's name changed to the Suffragette Fellowship and a magazine "Calling All Women" was published from 1947. Newsome wrote many obituaries for that publication.

The ODNB says that in 1954 the commemorative roll of honour to suffragette prisoners was created by Newsome, Edith How-Martyn and Elsa Gye. However Gye had died some years before and How-Martyn was impoverished in Australia. The Suffragette fellowship's membership was generally open only to those who had been imprisoned. The National Archives holds a list of suffragette prisoners (1905-1914) but is unsure of who particularly created it.

In 1957, to celebrate the 50th anniversary of the founding of the Women's Freedom League, Newsome published Women's Freedom League 1907–1957.

== Death and legacy ==
Newsome died accidentally in West Hampstead in 1969 shortly after the Suffragette Fellowship had celebrated her 80th birthday.
