= Marian Reeves =

British feminist activist

Marian Reeves (19 February 1879 – 30 August 1961) was a British feminist activist.

== Life ==
Born in Lewisham, then part of Kent, Reeves became interested in women's suffrage, and joined the Women's Freedom League (WFL) in 1909. She gradually came to prominence in the group, and by 1918 was the secretary of its branch in Kensington. By this time, the group had broadened its interests to campaign on a wide range of feminist issues.

During the 1920s, Reeves became involved with the WFL's publishing section, the Minerva Publishing Company, and in the middle of the decade she became the manager of the Minerva Club, the WFL's residential club in Brunswick Square. This suffrage offshoot had been founded by Dr Elizabeth Knight and Alice Green. The club was used for meetings but also acted as a hostel for suffrage activists and fund-raising annual birthday parties were organised for Charlotte Despard. Despard travelled from Ireland each year to attend.

The club was in the heart of Bloomsbury, and Reeves befriended many of the Bloomsbury Set. She also came to know many other residents of the area, and during World War II she founded the London Emergency Apartment Keepers' Society (LEAKS) to support the many local owners of boarding houses and hotels.

Reeves served on the national executive of the WFL for many years, and eventually became the organisation's president. She sat on many committees, including those of the Equal Pay Campaign, the Association for Moral and Social Hygiene, the Open Door Council, the Nationality Married Women Committee and the Women Peers Committee. She sat on the United Nations Association's women's advisory council, and was a vice-chair of the British Commonwealth League, the Status of Women Committee, and the Suffragette Fellowship. She regularly attended congresses of the International Alliance of Women, and it was in 1961, while travelling in Ireland following a congress, that she died.
