= Lilian Lenton =

English suffragette

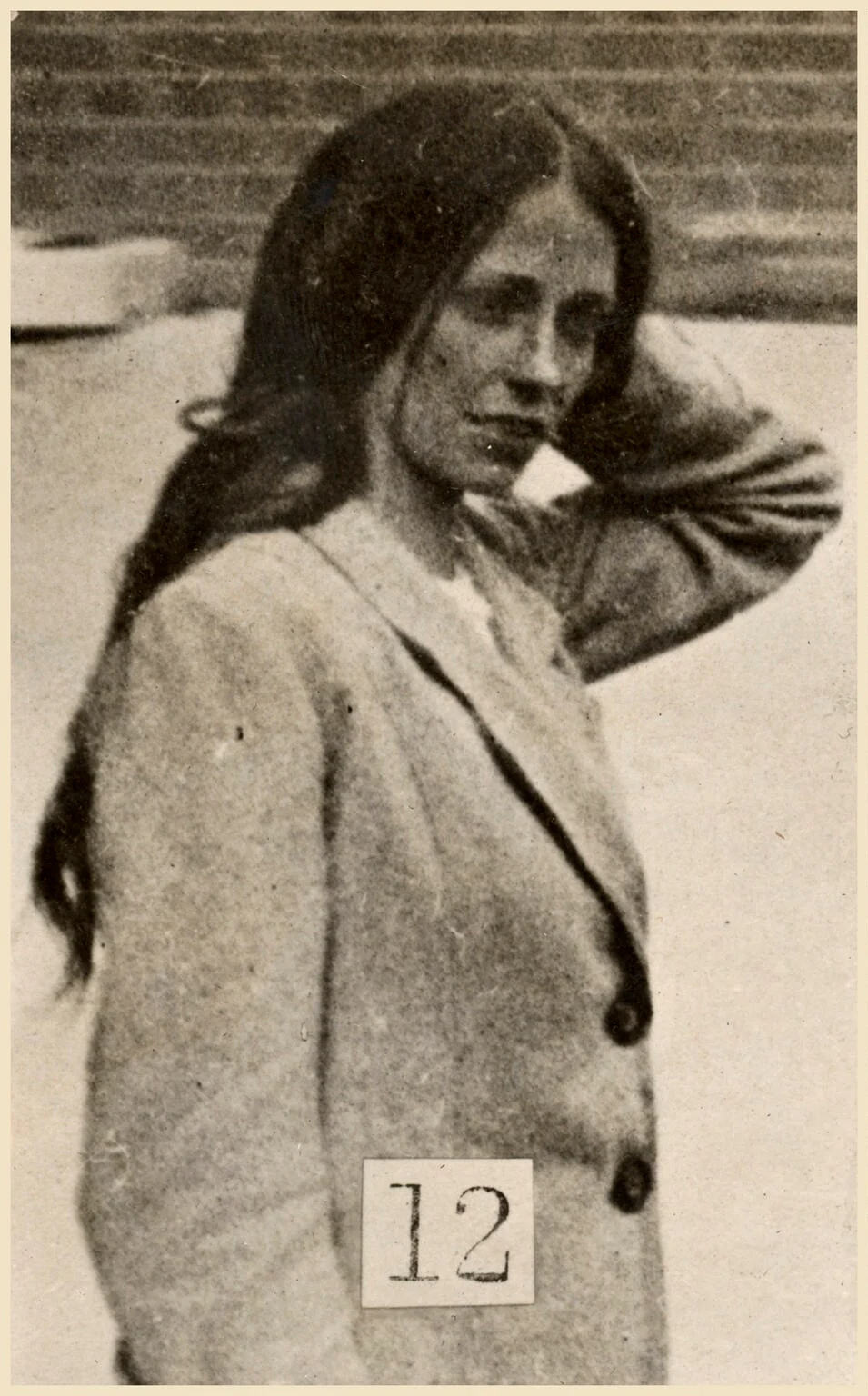
- Lilian Lenton in a Home Office surveillance photograph of c.1912
- Born: 5 January 1891; Leicester, England
- Died: 28 October 1972 (aged 84)
- Occupation: Suffragette

Lilian Ida Lenton (5 January 1891 – 28 October 1972) was an English dancer and militant suffragette, and later a winner of a French Red Cross medal for her service as an orderly in World War I. She committed crimes, including arson, for the suffragette cause. In 1970 she was invited to unveil the Suffragette Memorial.

== Early years ==
Lillie Lenton was born in Leicester in 1891, the eldest of five children born to Isaac Lenton (1867–1930), a carpenter-joiner, and his wife Mahalah Lenton (née Bee; 1864–1920), a housewife. On leaving school she trained to be a dancer, but, after hearing Emmeline Pankhurst speak, she " ... made up my mind that night that as soon as I was twenty-one and my own boss ... I would volunteer".

Lenton and her mother evaded the 1911 census as part of the suffragette boycott. On attaining the age of 21, Lenton joined the Women's Social and Political Union, and with fellow members took part in a window-smashing campaign in March 1912. She was jailed for two months under the alias "Ida Inkley".

== Notoriety ==
The Tea House at Kew Gardens after the arson attack by Lenton and Wharry

A suffragette being force fed, in a contemporary poster

In early 1913, with Olive Wharry, she began a series of arson attacks in London, and was arrested in February 1913 on suspicion of having set on fire the Tea House at Kew Gardens. In Holloway Prison she held a hunger strike for two days before being forcibly fed, which caused her to become seriously ill with pleurisy caused by food entering her lungs. It took two doctors and seven wardens to restrain her. She was quickly and quietly released.

Her case created an outrage among the public, made worse by the fact that the Home Secretary, Reginald McKenna, denied that she had been force fed and that her illness was actually caused by her hunger strike. However, Home Office papers show that she was force fed on 23 February 1913.

A letter to The Times in 1913, from Victor Horsley, a leading surgeon, claimed "...the Home Secretary's attempted denial that Miss Lenton was nearly killed by the forcible feeding is worthless...she was tied into a chair and her head dragged backward across the back of the chair by her hair. The tube was forced through the nose twice . . . after the second introduction when the food was poured in, it caused violent choking." To avoid more such political embarrassment, the Government rushed through its "Cat and Mouse Act" in April 1913, which stated that hunger-striking suffragette "mice" could be released on temporary licence to recover their health, when the security forces could re-arrest them.

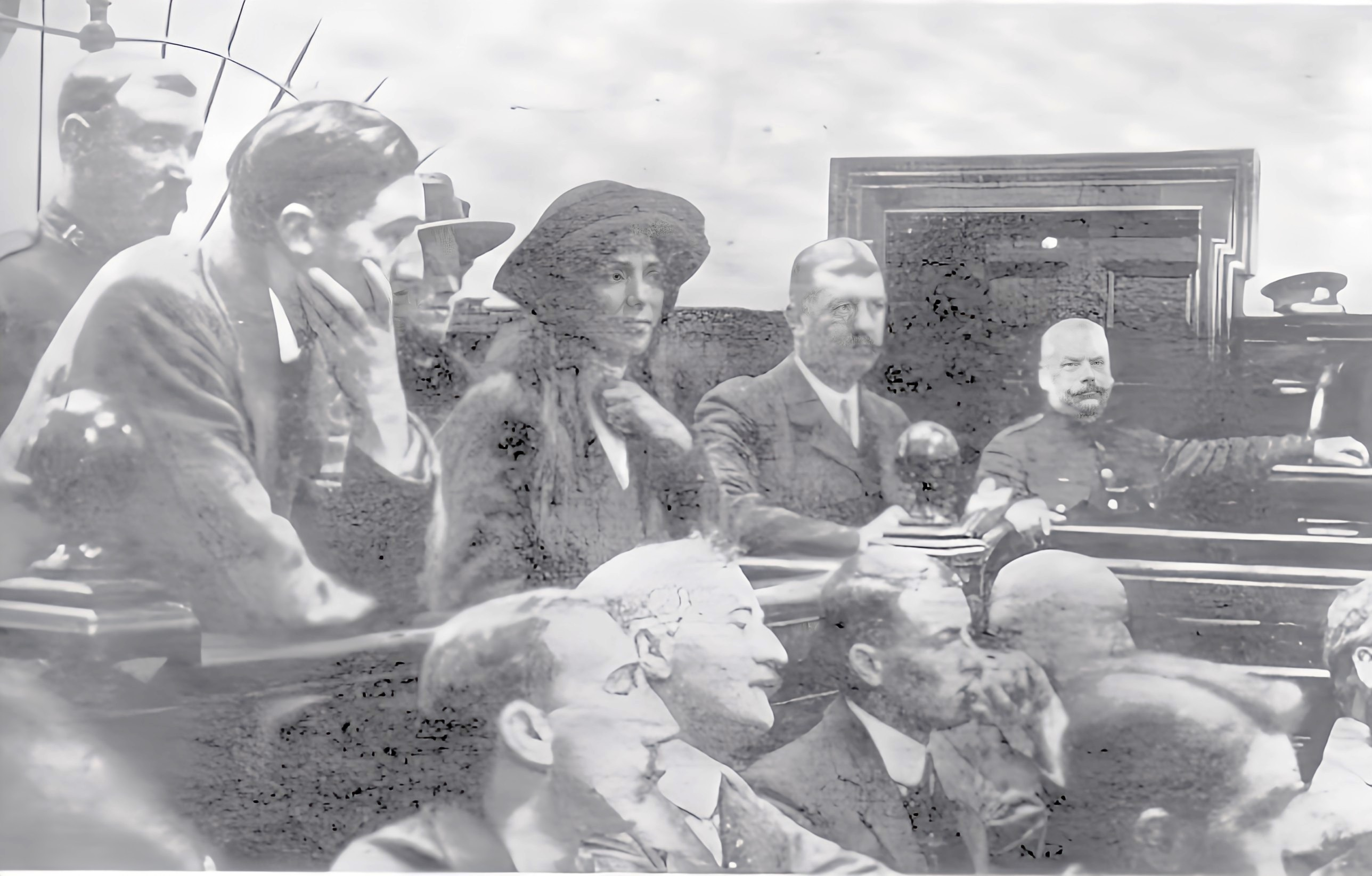
Lenton and Harry Johnson (left) in the dock at Leeds Assizes in June 1913

In June 1913 Lenton was arrested in Doncaster and charged as "May Dennis" with being on the premises of an unoccupied house which had been set on fire. She was released from Armley Prison in Leeds after several days; on this occasion there had been no attempt to force feed her. Her accomplice in the arson attack was an 18-year-old local journalist called Harry Johnson, who was sentenced to 12 months with hard labour in Wakefield Prison.

In July 1913, the police in Leeds were searching for Lenton when an elaborate plot was hatched, while she was staying with Frank Rutter, Director of the Leeds Art Gallery, to enable her to escape in a delivery van, driven by Leonora Cohen dressed as a baker's man while Lenton swapped places with Nora Duval dressed as an errand boy reading a comic and eating an apple. Taxis took her to Harrogate, then Scarborough, from where she escaped to France in a private yacht.

The Criminal Record Office issued a surveillance photograph of her (see above right) taken secretly in the exercise yard of Holloway Prison, in the accompanying details of which she is described as being 5 feet 2 inches tall with brown eyes and hair. Lenton later stated, "Whenever I was out of prison my object was to burn two buildings a week… The object was to create an absolutely impossible condition of affairs in the country, to prove it was impossible to govern without the consent of the governed." She was arrested in October 1913 while collecting a bicycle from the left luggage office at Paddington Station, and while on remand went on a combined hunger and thirst strike, for which she was again forcibly fed. Her physical health again being seriously affected by this treatment, she was released on licence for 5 days into the care of a Mrs. Diplock of London, but again absconded.

Lenton was rearrested on 22 December 1913, on a charge of setting fire to a house in Cheltenham. She was recognised from her police surveillance photograph, and imprisoned, when she commenced another hunger and thirst strike, being released at 11 a.m. into the care of Mrs. Impey of Birmingham, from whose home she absconded yet again, remaining at large until early May 1914 when she was rearrested at Birkenhead. Held on remand and awaiting trial at the Leeds Assizes for the arson committed at Doncaster, she again went on hunger and thirst strike until she was released on 12 May 1914. Due to the frequency of her escapes Lenton became known as the "tiny, wily, elusive Pimpernel". She received a Hunger Strike Medal "for Valour" from the WSPU.

The Women's Social and Political Union suspended their militant campaign in 1914 at the outbreak of World War I to focus on the war effort. During this time women worked in jobs traditionally done by men, proving they could do them just as well and silencing one of the last arguments against women's suffrage. After the war the Representation of the People Act 1918 was passed awarding the vote to women householders, or the wives of householders, aged 30 and over. Lenton was unimpressed by this concession, later relating in a BBC documentary, "Personally I didn't vote for a very long time because I hadn't either a husband or furniture, although I was over 30."

Lenton turned 30 in 1921. Women were given equal voting rights to men including lowering the voting age to 21, by the Representation of the People (Equal Franchise) Act 1928 when she was 37.

== Later years ==
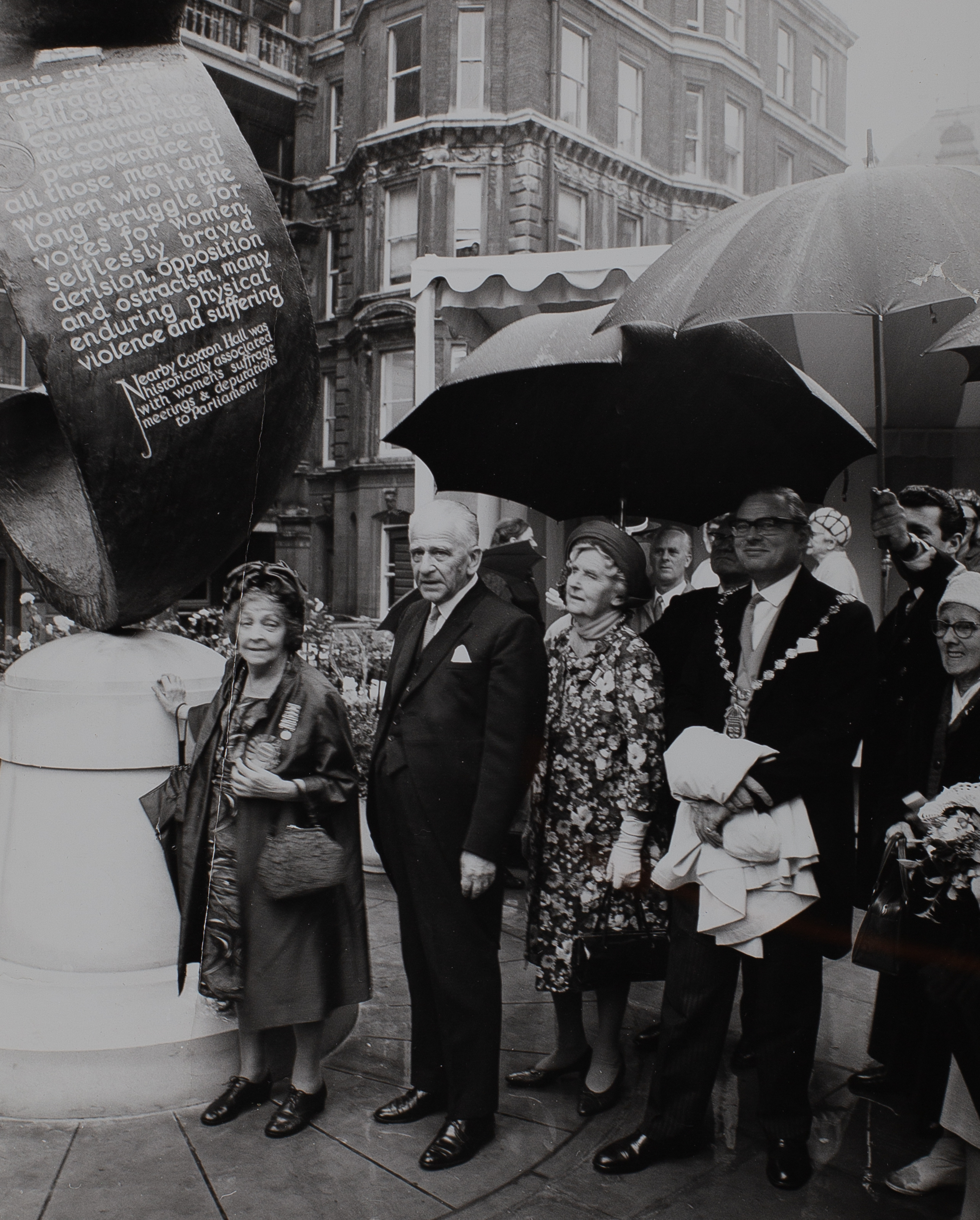
Lilian Lenton unveiling the Suffragette Memorial, with Grace Roe nearby, in 1970

Just before the First World War Lenton met author D. H. Lawrence when she fled from the police and escaped to the Lake District. He was introduced to her as "a man who's only got one subject, and that's sex". During World War I Lenton served in Serbia with the Scottish Women's Hospitals Unit and was awarded a French Red Cross medal. After the Russian Revolution she travelled in Russia with fellow suffragette Nina Boyle. Lenton later worked in the British Embassy in Stockholm. She was a speaker for the Save the Children Fund, and from 1924 to 1933 was a speaker and travel organiser for the Women's Freedom League, as well as the editor of the League's Bulletin for over 11 years. After working in Scotland in animal welfare, Lenton became the financial secretary of the National Union of Women Teachers until 1953.

In 1955 she appeared with other former suffragettes in a BBC News broadcast beside the statue of Mrs Pankhurst to mark the 37th anniversary of women getting the vote. She was again filmed in 1959 when she discussed the Cat and Mouse Act. This item was broadcast in January 1960. Finally, she was interviewed for BBC News in October 1961 when she discussed her meeting with D. H. Lawrence. She confessed during the interview that the only one of his books she had read since meeting him was Lady Chatterley's Lover, stating "it must have been an expurgated edition, because I don't remember anything special about it".

In 1970, as Treasurer of the Suffragette Fellowship, Lenton unveiled the Suffragette Memorial in Christchurch Gardens, Westminster, dedicated to all the women who had fought to get the vote.

Lilian Lenton died in 1972. She never married.

== See also ==
- Suffragette bombing and arson campaign
- List of suffragists and suffragettes
