= Grace Roe =

Head of suffragette operations for the WSPU (1885–1979)

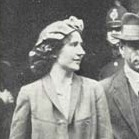
- From the Daily Mirror
- Born: Eleanor Grace Watney Roe; 1 August 1885; Norwood, Surrey, England, United Kingdom of Great Britain and Ireland
- Died: 1979 (93 or 94); Tonbridge, Kent, England, UK
- Occupation: Suffragette

Eleanor Grace Watney Roe (1 August 1885 – 1979) was an English suffragette who was Head of Suffragette operations for the Women's Social and Political Union. She was released from prison after the outbreak of World War I due to an amnesty for suffragettes negotiated with the government by the WSPU.

== Early life ==
The daughter of Thomas Henry Roe (1858–1927) and Eleanor Jane Watney Roe (1856–1897), Eleanor Grace Watney Roe was born on 1 August 1885 in Norwood, Surrey. In the 1901 Census the family was living at 11 Veronica Road, Wandsworth. She was educated at Bedales, a progressive mixed-sex boarding school, before attending art college. She became a vegetarian when she was 12.

== Suffragette activity ==
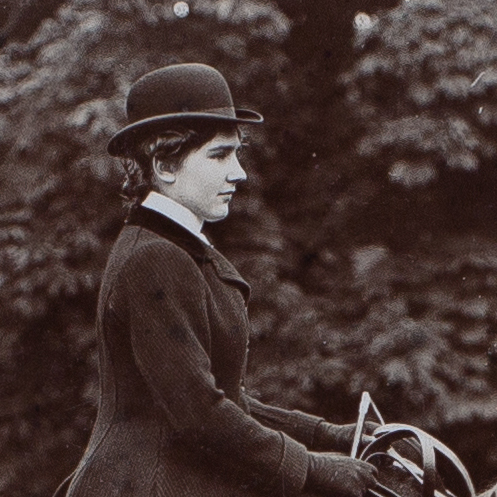
Grace Roe on horseback in 1905

Roe later recalled that at the age of six she was interested in women's rights. She said that she met her first suffragette who was chalking "Votes for Women" on the pavement together with the details of a meeting when she was out shopping in London. She was impressed by Lucy Burns coming from America to fight for this cause, courting imprisonment.

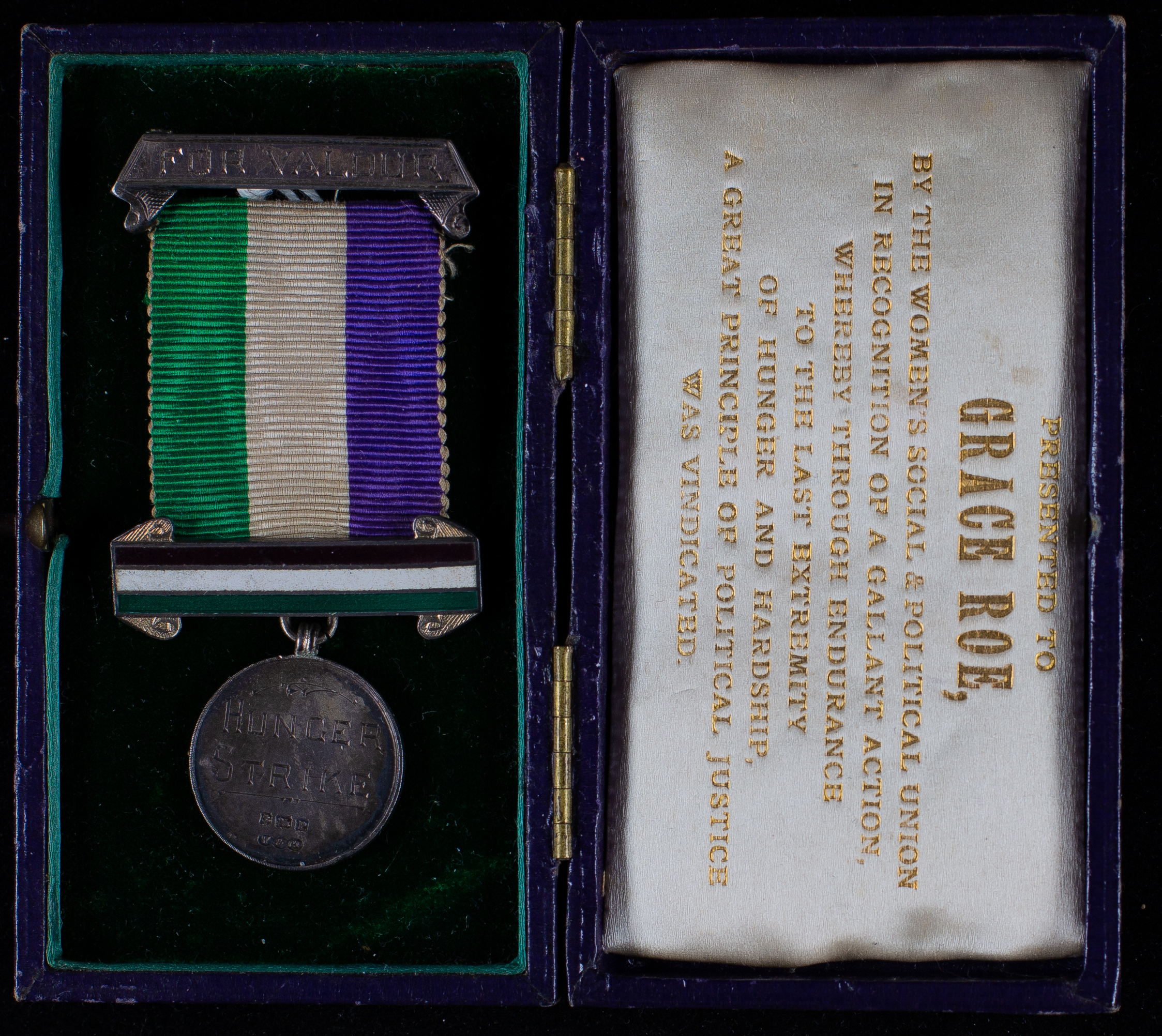
Grace Roe's Hunger strike medal from 1914

She was told that the suffragettes were "unwomanly" so she resisted joining the Women's Social and Political Union (WSPU) despite being impressed by the majestic figure of Emmeline Pankhurst and her daughter, Christabel, when she heard them speak in 1908. Later that year she heard Emmeline Pethick-Lawrence speak and, given that she was financially independent, she opted to join the campaign. Christobel was very close to Annie Kenney, who had joined the campaign in 1905. It has been claimed that Christobel transferred her affections to Grace Roe and that they may have been in a lesbian relationship.

She was succeeded in 1910 as organiser of the Brixton branch of WSPU by Helen Craggs. Roe was sent to Ipswich and in about 40 days she had transformed the town, which had had only one WSPU member. She was based at 19 Silent Street and she invited other leading suffragettes like Marie Brackenbury and Mildred Mansel down to help.

In October 1912, George Lansbury resigned his parliamentary seat to fight a by-election in his constituency of Bow and Bromley on the specific issue of women's suffrage. Roe was sent by the WSPU to lead his campaign. He lost to his Conservative opponent, who campaigned on the slogan "No Petticoat Government". Sylvia Pankhurst later criticised Roe's campaign but Labour MP Will Thorne figured that no constituency could ever be won on the single question of votes for women.

Roe was chosen as the deputy to Annie Kenney so that she could take over if necessary and eventually Kenney was arrested and Roe took over her role. The WSPU awarded Roe a Hunger Strike Medal 'for Valour' and a Holloway brooch.

When war broke out in 1914, Roe was in Holloway prison where she was force fed. She was released as part of the deal struck by the WSPU with the government. The WSPU agreed to cease militant disruption and in exchange the government released all the suffragettes and the WSPU supported the war effort.

== World War I ==
In 1915, Roe accompanied Emmeline Pankhurst, Flora Drummond, Norah Dacre Fox and Annie Kenney to South Wales, the Midlands and Clydeside on a recruiting and lecture tour to encourage trade unions to support war work.

== United States residency ==
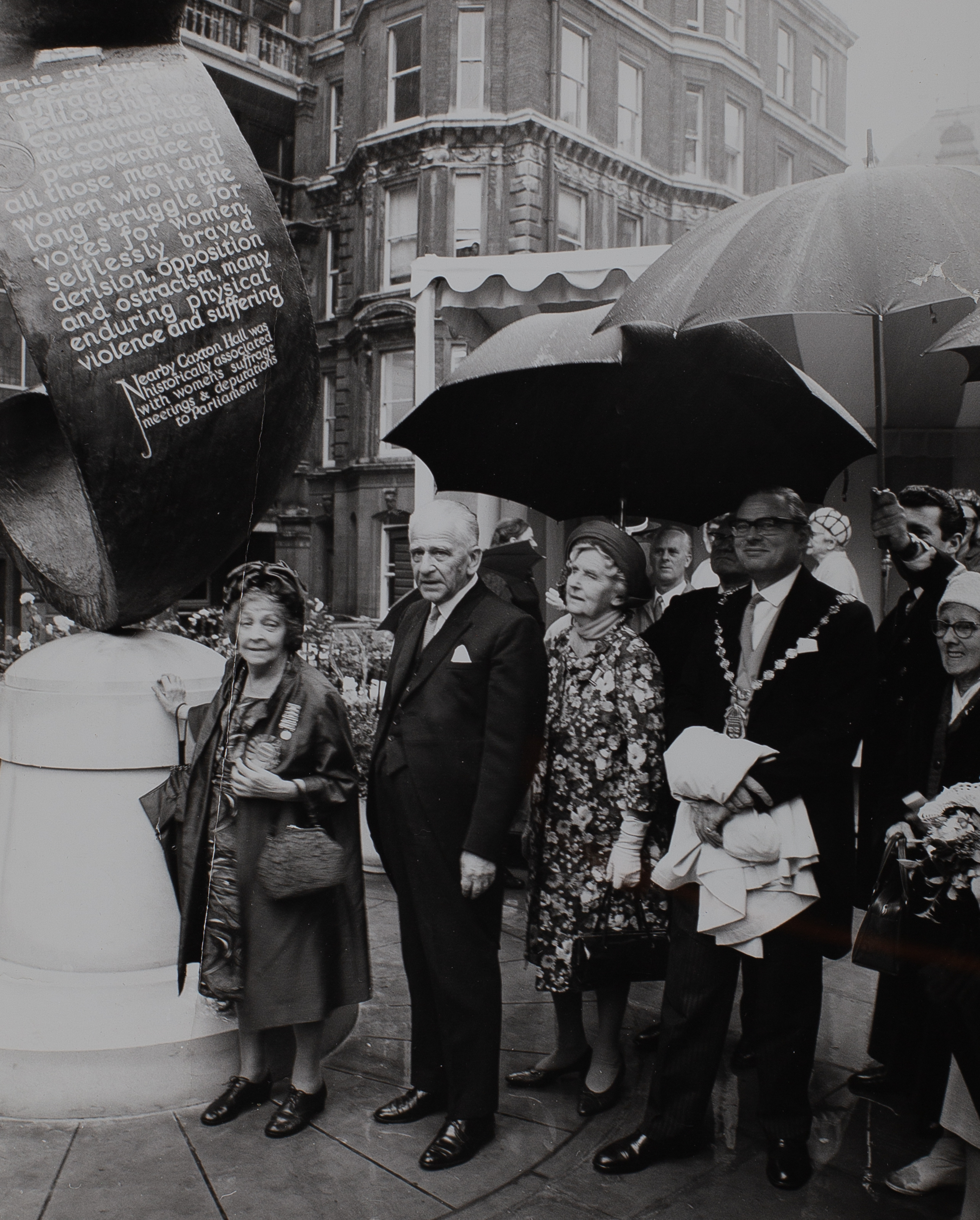
Militant suffragettes Lilian Lenton and Grace Roe at the unveiling of the Suffragette Memorial in 1970

After the Second World War, Roe opened a bookshop and metaphysical library in Santa Barbara, California. She stayed in close contact with Christabel Pankhurst and was with her when the latter died at her home in Santa Monica, California on 13 February 1958 (aged 77) from a heart attack.

Roe was appointed Pankhurst's literary executor and was responsible for the publication of Christabel's memoirs, Unshackled: the Story of how we Won the Vote.

== Legacy ==
Roe was interviewed twice for the BBC concerning her role in the suffrage struggle. She was seen wearing her Holloway brooch in a reunion with Leonora Cohen, on the cover of Radio Times.

Brian Harrison recorded 2 oral history interviews with Roe, in September and October 1974, as part of the Suffrage Interviews project, titled Oral evidence on the suffragette and suffragist movements: the Brian Harrison interviews. Roe talks about her reasons for joining the WSPU, her family relationships, and recalls her experiences with a number of other suffrage campaigners, most notably Emmeline and Christabel Pankhurst.

== See also ==
- List of suffragettes and suffragists

== Sources ==
- Schneer, Jonathan (1990). George Lansbury: Lives of the Left. Manchester, UK: Manchester University Press. ISBN 0-7190-2170-7.
- Shepherd, John (2002). George Lansbury: At the Heart of Old Labour. Oxford: Oxford University Press. ISBN 0-19-820164-8.
