= Emma Sproson =

British suffragist and politician

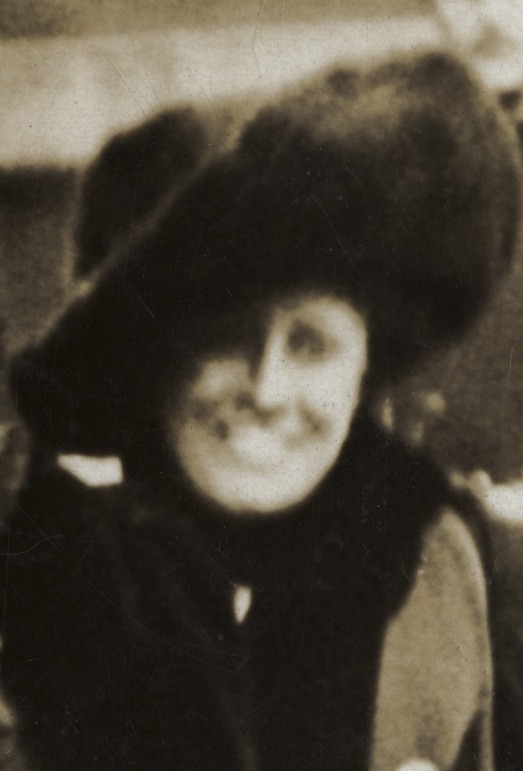
- Born: Emily Lloyd; 13 April 1867; West Bromwich, Staffordshire, England
- Died: 22 December 1936 (aged 69); Tettenhall, Staffordshire England

Emma Sproson (13 April 1867 – 22 December 1936), was a suffragette, then a suffragist, socialist, politician and women's rights activist. Active in the Midlands and from a working class background, she became Wolverhampton's first female councillor, gaining the nickname "Red Emma" in the process.

== Early life ==
Sproson was born Emily Lloyd on 13 April 1867 in West Bromwich, Staffordshire (now in the West Midlands), England. She was one of seven children of Ann, née Johnson, and her husband, John, a builder of canal boats; he was a heavy drinker, and the family lived in extreme poverty. In the mid-1870s the family moved to Wolverhampton and, at around the same time, Emma began to work part-time, running errands or picking coal off the local tips and slag heaps.

In around 1876, at the age of nine, she left home and went into domestic service, although she was able to attend school four days a week. When she was thirteen she obtained a position working in a shop, although she was dismissed after accusing the owner's brother of making sexual advances towards her. Unemployed, she moved to Lancashire to find work; she taught at a Sunday school and joined a church debating society.

== Political awakening and activism ==
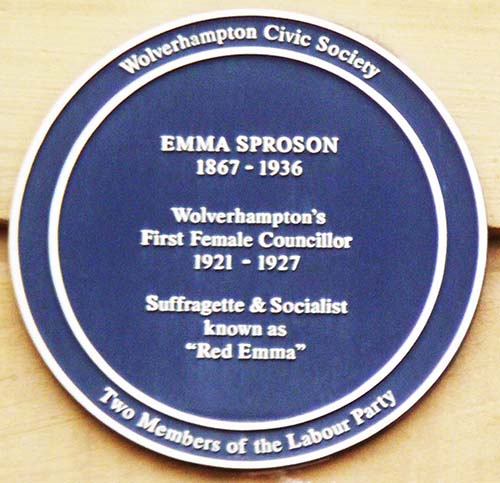
Blue plaque for Sproson

The historian Jane Martin, in Sproson's entry in the Oxford Dictionary of National Biography describes Sproson's attendance at a public political meeting as "the defining moment in her conversion to women's suffrage". At the meeting Sproson asked Lord Curzon a question; he refused on the basis that "she was a woman and did not have the vote".

Sproson returned to Wolverhampton by 1895 with enough money to set up a business—most likely a shop in the front room of the house she began sharing with her mother. She became a member of the Independent Labour Party (ILP) around this time and, in August 1896, she married Frank Sproson, a postman and the secretary of the Wolverhampton branch of the ILP; he was also supportive of the movement for women's suffrage. The couple had four children, although only three survived: Frank, born in 1899; Chloris, born in 1897; and George, born in 1906.

In October 1906 Frank Sproson invited Emmeline Pankhurst of the Women's Social and Political Union (WSPU) to speak at an ILP meeting. Emma acted as the Chair for the meeting and Pankhurst stayed overnight at the couple's house. Emma joined the WSPU shortly afterwards, and began a letter-writing campaign to local newspapers.

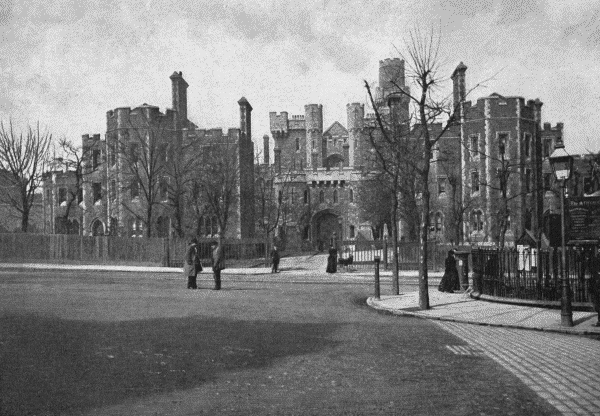
Holloway Prison, where Sproson was incarcerated

In early-1907 Sproson attended suffrage meetings in London and, on 13 February, she attended a WSPU meeting at Caxton Hall, followed by a march to parliament. The marchers tried to force their way into the Palace of Westminster; police intervened and Sproson and others were arrested. Given a choice between a fine or a two-week prison sentence, she chose incarceration. The following month she was arrested, again on a march from Caxton Hall to parliament. She was sent to Holloway Prison for a month, where she was visited by Christabel Pankhurst, the co-founder of the WSPU.

On her release Sproson attended and spoke at a lunch hosted to celebrate the release of all those imprisoned. She returned to Wolverhampton, where she and fellow WSPU member Jennie Baines spoke at a public meeting before she went on a WSPU speaking tour of the Black Country.

In late-1907 or early-1908 Sproson, growing increasingly unhappy with the authoritarian manner in which the Pankhursts ran the WSPU, left the organisation and joined the Women's Freedom League (WFL), a non-violent suffrage group. She became branch secretary in Wolverhampton and a member of the National Executive by February 1908.

Sproson was also a member of the Women's Tax Resistance League, who refused to pay tax in protest against disenfranchisement; tax resistance was also a policy of the WFL. In May 1911 she was sent to prison for seven days for refusing to pay for a dog licence. She went on hunger strike and was reclassified as a political prisoner. Her dog was shot by the police.

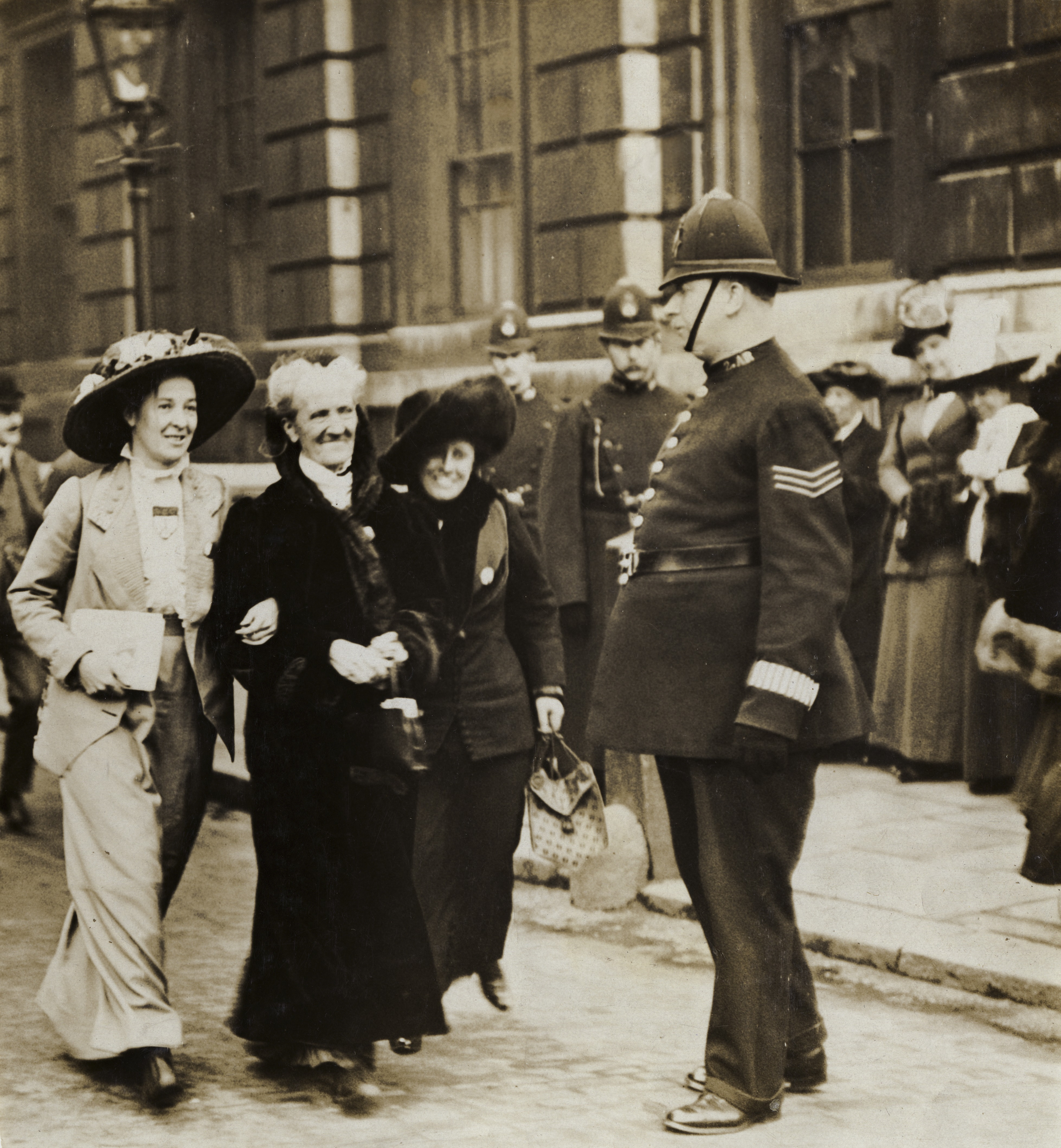
(l to r) Edith How-Martyn, Charlotte Despard and Sproson, acting for the WFL

In November 1911 Sproson joined the WFL leader Charlotte Despard and three other WFL members as a delegation to meet H. H. Asquith, the Prime Minister. By April 1912 Sproson had become disenchanted with Despard's autocratic control over the WFL, and she left the organisation. She took no further part in national campaigning, but concentrated instead on local politics.

== Local politics ==
In 1919 and 1920 Sproson stood in local elections for the Labour Party in the Wolverhampton Park ward, but was unelected. In 1921 she stood in the Dunstall ward, where she was successful; in doing so, she became Wolverhampton's first female councillor. To mark her victory she waved a red flag from the balcony of Wolverhampton town hall, which earned her the nickname "Red Emma". She served on committees dealing with health—particularly mental health—and housing for single mothers. In late 1922 she exposed financial corruption at the local fever hospital, although the subsequent investigation rejected the allegations; she was censured by the Labour Party as a result.

Sproson successfully defended herself at the local by-election in 1924, but left the Labour Party before the next election in 1927; she stood as an independent candidate but lost. It marked the end of her activity in political life.

Sproson's hearing declined in her later years, and she died at home on 22 December 1936. Jane Martin concludes that "Sproson's working-class, midlands-based career provides a vivid counterbalance to the view of the women's suffrage movement which portrays it as predominantly bourgeois and London-centred".

== Sources ==
- Crawford, Elizabeth (2003). The Women's Suffrage Movement: A Reference Guide 1866–1928. London: UCL Press. ISBN 978-1-135-43402-1.
- "Emma Lloyd Sproson: Formative Years". Wolverhampton City Council.
- "Emma Lloyd Sproson: Women's Freedom League". Wolverhampton City Council.
- "Emma Lloyd Sproson: Councillor". Wolverhampton City Council.
- Martin, Jane (2008). "Sproson [née Lloyd], Emma (1867–1936)". Oxford Dictionary of National Biography (online ed.). Oxford University Press. doi:10.1093/ref:odnb/63890. (Subscription, Wikipedia Library access or UK public library membership required.)
