= Suffragette Memorial =

Sculpture in London, England

Coordinates: 51.498244°N 0.134823°W

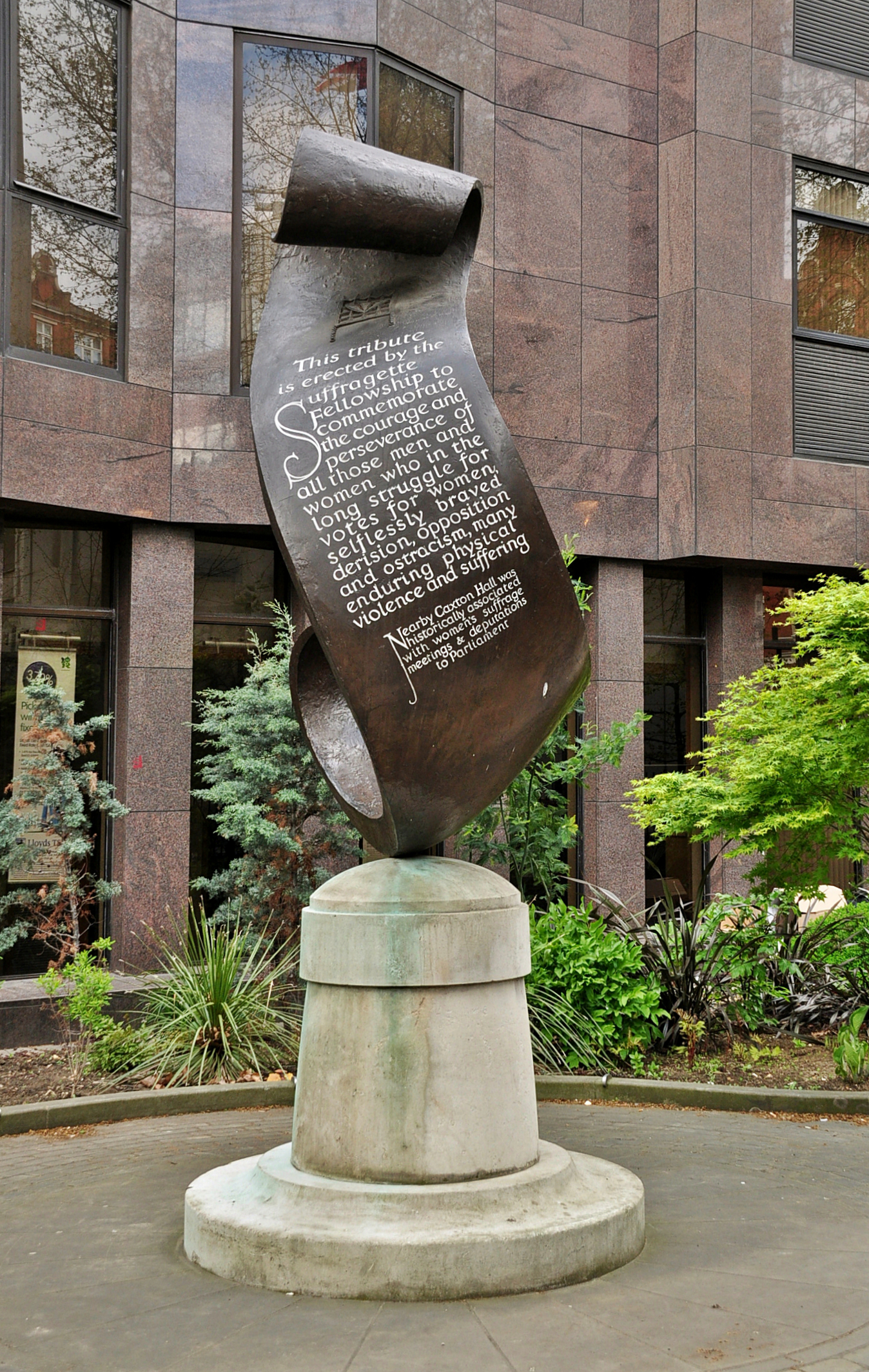
The sculpture in 2012

The Suffragette Memorial is an outdoor sculpture commemorating those who fought for women's suffrage in the United Kingdom, located in the north-west corner of Christchurch Gardens, Victoria, London. The sculptors were Lorne McKean and Edwin Russell and the project was devised and supervised by the architect Paul Paget. The memorial was unveiled in 1970. It takes the form of a scroll in the shape of the letter S, created in fibreglass and finished in cold-cast bronze, placed on a conical plinth. The text of the scroll reads:

This tribute is erected by the Suffragette Fellowship to commemorate the courage and perseverance of all those men and women who in the long struggle for votes for women selflessly braved derision, opposition and ostracism, many enduring physical violence and suffering.

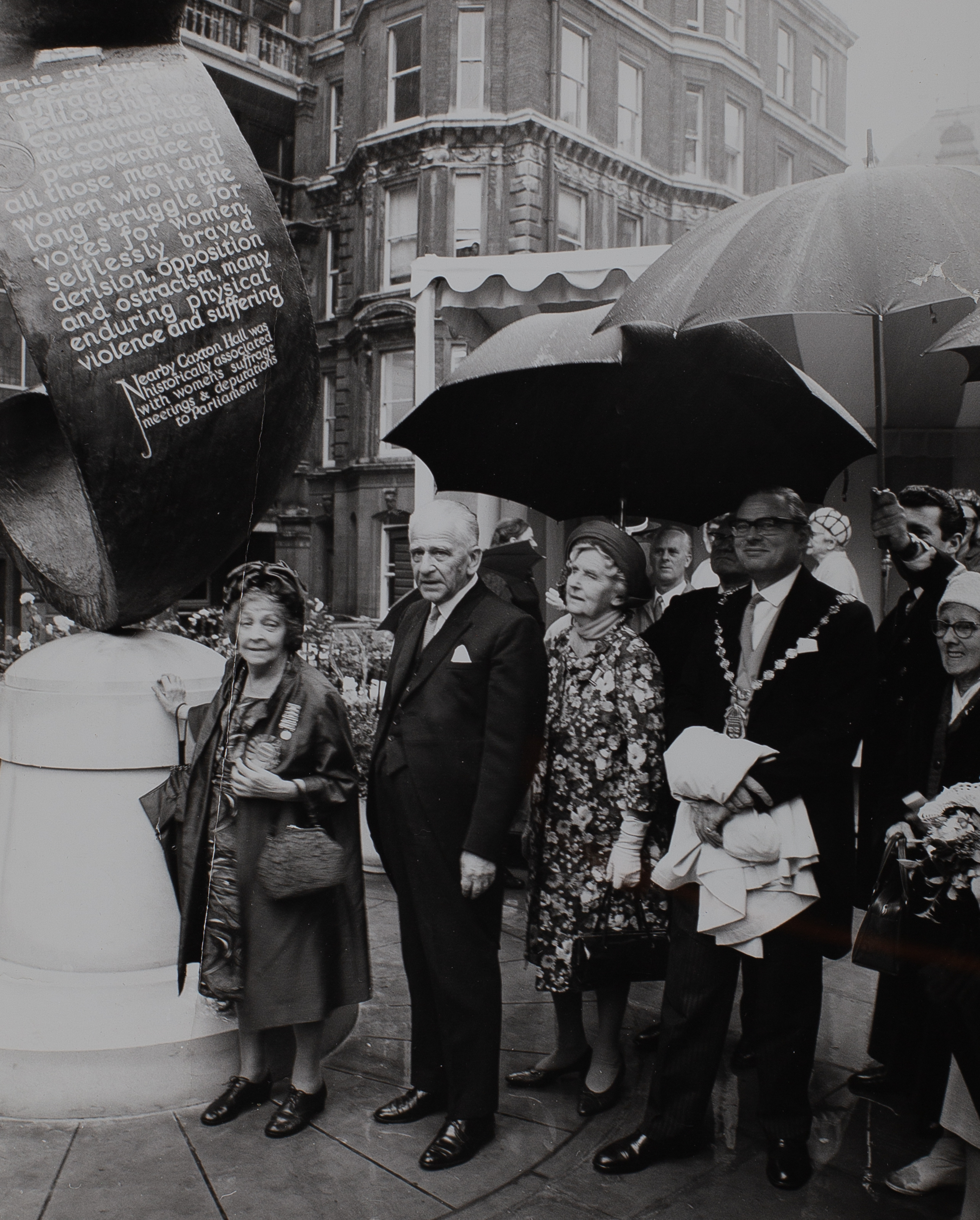
Militant suffragettes Lilian Lenton and Grace Roe at the unveiling in 1970

An additional inscription notes that Caxton Hall, a nearby building on the corner of Caxton Street and Palmer Street, "was historically associated with women's suffrage meetings and deputations to Parliament". The badge of the Women's Social and Political Union and the Women's Freedom League, known as the Holloway brooch, appears on both sides of the scroll; at the back of the scroll this is accompanied by a representation of the entrance to Holloway Prison.

The memorial was commissioned by the Suffragette Fellowship, an organisation dedicated to commemorating the fight for women's suffrage whose membership was confined to living suffragettes or the families of suffragettes. A number of surviving suffragettes attended the unveiling, including the Fellowship's president Grace Roe and Edith Clayton Pepper, Leonora Cohen and Lilian Lenton. At the unveiling the Labour politician Edith Summerskill told the audience of the debt she felt towards the suffragettes, adding "I will not fail to try to make some contribution to the women's cause". Also in attendance, the Labour politician and Speaker of the House of Commons Horace King said that he believed that there would "sooner or later" be a woman Prime Minister of the United Kingdom.

== See also ==
- List of monuments and memorials to women's suffrage

== Bibliography ==
- Ward-Jackson, Philip (2011), Public Sculpture of Historic Westminster: Volume 1, Public Sculpture of Britain, vol. 14, Liverpool: Liverpool University Press, ISBN 978-1-84631-691-3
