= Birth Control International Information Centre =

International clearinghouse based in London

The Birth Control International Information Centre (BCIIC) (1929–38) was a London-based independent, international clearinghouse for birth control information established by American birth control leader Margaret Sanger and British suffragist Edith How-Martyn. It supported the establishment of clinics and maternity advice centers abroad, sponsored lecture tours and a conference.

== Founding ==
In 1928 a birth control information center was established in London under the direction of Edith How-Martyn. In 1930, following the Seventh International Conference on Birth Control in Zurich, the Centre was re-organised as the BCIIC, with Margaret Sanger as Honorary President and How-Martyn as Honorary Director.

== Activities ==
The Centre served as a clearinghouse for birth control information, published pamphlets, newsletters, bulletins and other information about contraception methods, new research and clinic updates. It also sponsored several tours of Asia, Russia and the Middle East, for How-Martyn and Sanger to encourage the adoption of birth control and formation of clinics for birth control in regions around the world. This included Sanger's tour of Scandinavia and the Soviet Union in 1934, How-Martyn's tour of India in 1934, and Sanger and How-Martyn's World Tour for Birth Control in 1935–1936, during which they spoke to numerous groups and organised birth control organisations in India, Burma, Malay, China, the Philippines, Japan, Hawaii, Canada, and the West Coast of the United States.

The BCIIC coordinated international birth control activities (the organisation of clinics and conferences) with the help of correspondents in over 30 countries. Centre staff also arranged for visitors to tour clinics in London and New York City, and hosted weekly meetings in London with guest speakers from various countries. It was a member society of the National Birth Control Council (Britain), but received independent support John and Gerda Guy, Clinton and Janet Chance, and others.

== Administrative problems ==
In 1935 How-Martyn resigned from the BCIIC in a dispute about finances, followed a few weeks late by organising secretary Olive Johnson. How-Martyn was replaced by Dr. Maurice Newfield, and Johnson by Eleanor Hawarden. In 1937, Sanger decided she too would not be able to effectively run the organisation from the United States and resigned as president. She was replaced by Lord Thomas Horder. In addition, the Centre, which was privately financed, suffered budget shortages as the global Depression limited donations.

In 1938, at the suggestion of Lord Horder, the BCIIC merged with the National Birth Control Association of England (renamed the Family Planning Association of England, which continued much of the Centre's international agenda until after World War II.

== Sources ==
- Matthew Connelly, Fatal Misconception: The Struggle to Control World Population (Cambridge, MA, 2008), p. 101.
- Michael Fielding, Birth Control in Asia: A report of a Conference held at the London School of Hygiene & Tropical Medicine, 24–25 November 1933.
- The Eugenics Review XXVII:1 (January 1936): 328.
- Esther Katz, et al., eds. Margaret Sanger Papers Microfilm Editions: Collected Documents Series and Smith college Collections (University Publications of America, 1996, 1997) Margaret Sanger Papers Project Microfilm Edition
- Margaret Sanger Papers Project
- Family Planning Association Archives
