= Edith How-Martyn =

British suffragette (1875–1954)

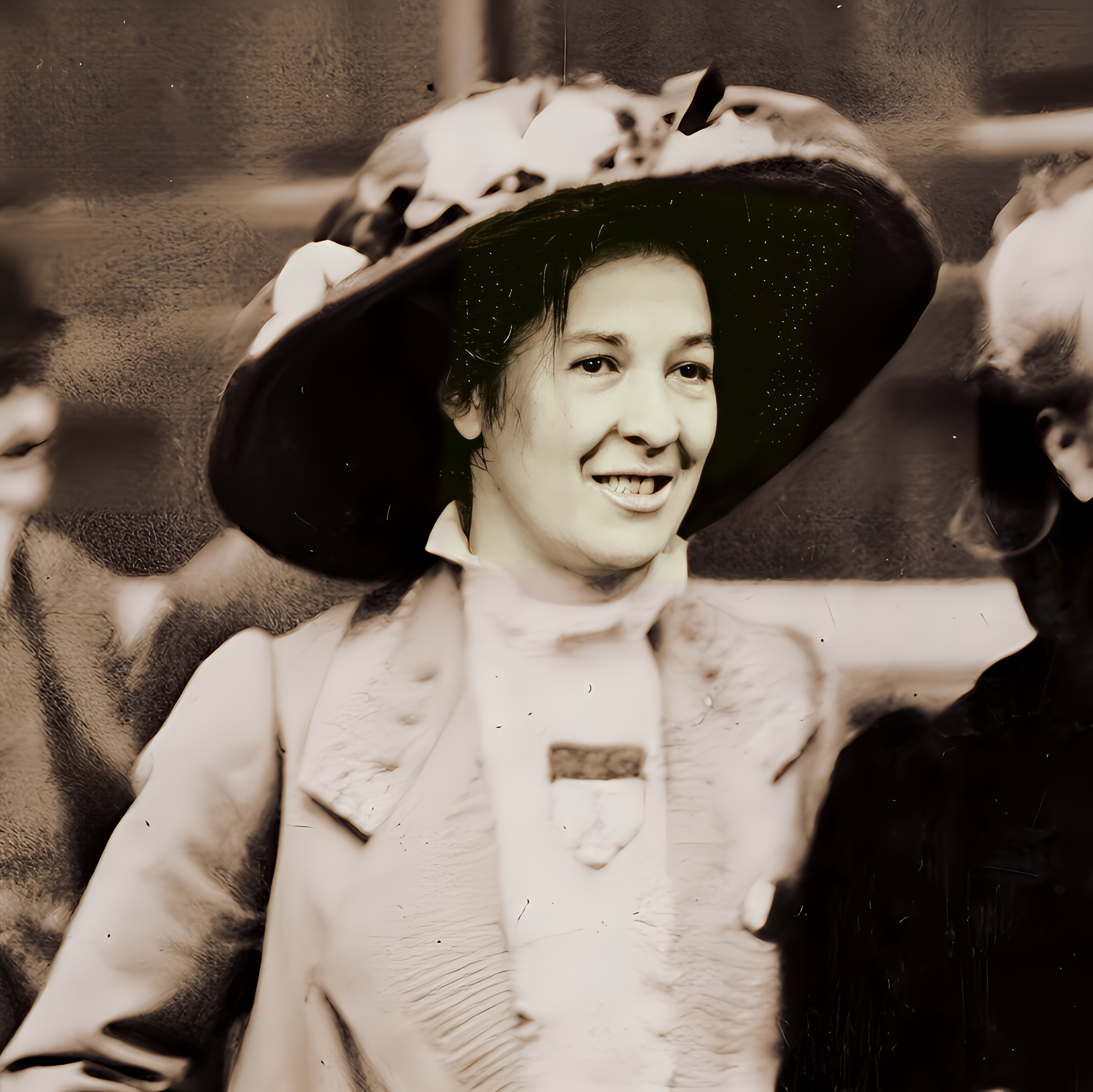
- Edith How-Martyn in 1914
- Born: Edith How; 7 June 1875; London, United Kingdom of Great Britain and Ireland
- Died: 2 February 1954 (aged 78); Sydney, Australia
- Education: University College, Aberystwyth
- Occupation: Suffragette
- Spouse: George Herbert Martyn (m. 1899)
- Children: none

Edith How-Martyn (née How; 17 June 1875 – 2 February 1954) was a British suffragette and a member of the Women's Social and Political Union (WSPU). She was arrested in 1906 for attempting to make a speech in the House of Commons. This was one of the first acts of suffragette militancy. She met Margaret Sanger in 1915 and they created a conference in Geneva. How-Martyn toured India talking about birth control. She had no children and died in Australia.

== Life ==
Edith How was born in London in 1875 to Edwin and Ann How. Her father was a grocer and her elder sister became the lawyer Florence Earengey. Edith attended the North London Collegiate School. She went to University College, Aberystwyth where she took Physics and Mathematics, gaining an external degree from the University of London in 1903.

She married George Herbert Martyn in 1899. She had radical political opinions and was a member of the Independent Labour Party before becoming an early member of the WSPU in 1905. The following year she was appointed joint secretary of the WSPU with Charlotte Despard and it was in October 1906 that she was arrested in the lobby of the House of Commons trying to give a speech. She was one of the first WSPU members to go to jail when she was given a two-month sentence.

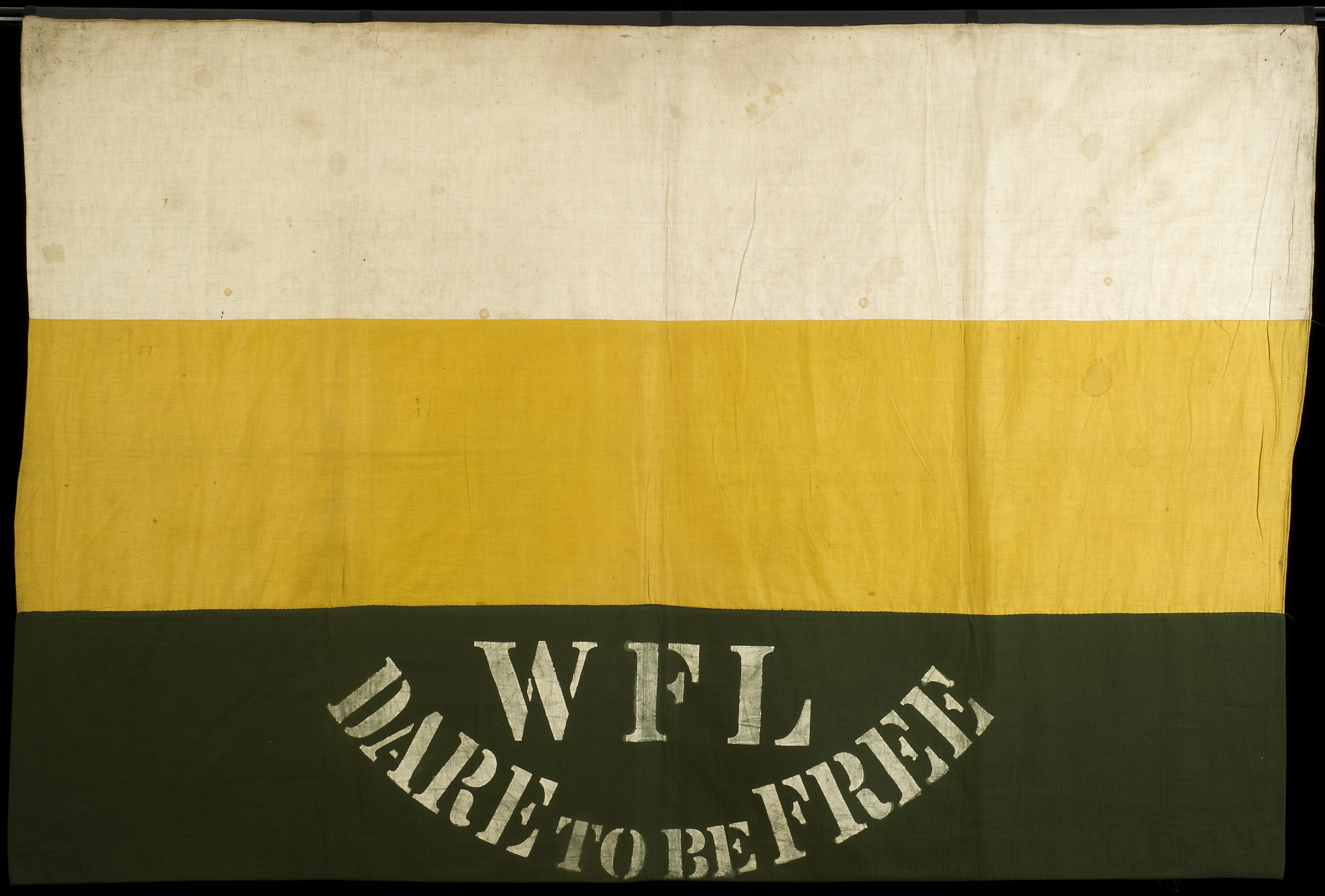
Women's Freedom League colours and motto 1908 Original in LSE Library

However, the future direction of the WSPU under the Pankhursts was a matter of some concern to her, as it was to other members at this time. In 1907, together with Charlotte Despard, Alice Abadam, Teresa Billington-Greig, Marion Coates-Hansen, Irene Miller, Bessie Drysdale, Maude Fitzherbert) were signatories to a letter to Emmeline Pankhurst explaining their disquiet on 14 September 1907. This group formed the Women's Freedom League (WFL), which abandoned the violent tactics of the WSPU group in favour of non-violent illegal acts to convey their message. How-Martyn was honorary secretary of the new group, whose motto was 'Dare to be Free' from 1907 to 1911, when she became head of the Political and Militant section. However, she resigned in April 1912, disappointed with the WFL's progress after the defeat of the Conciliation Bill. How-Martyn together with Charlotte Despard and Emma Sproson made a delegation to the British Prime Minister. She had also refused to pay taxes that were only voted for by men.

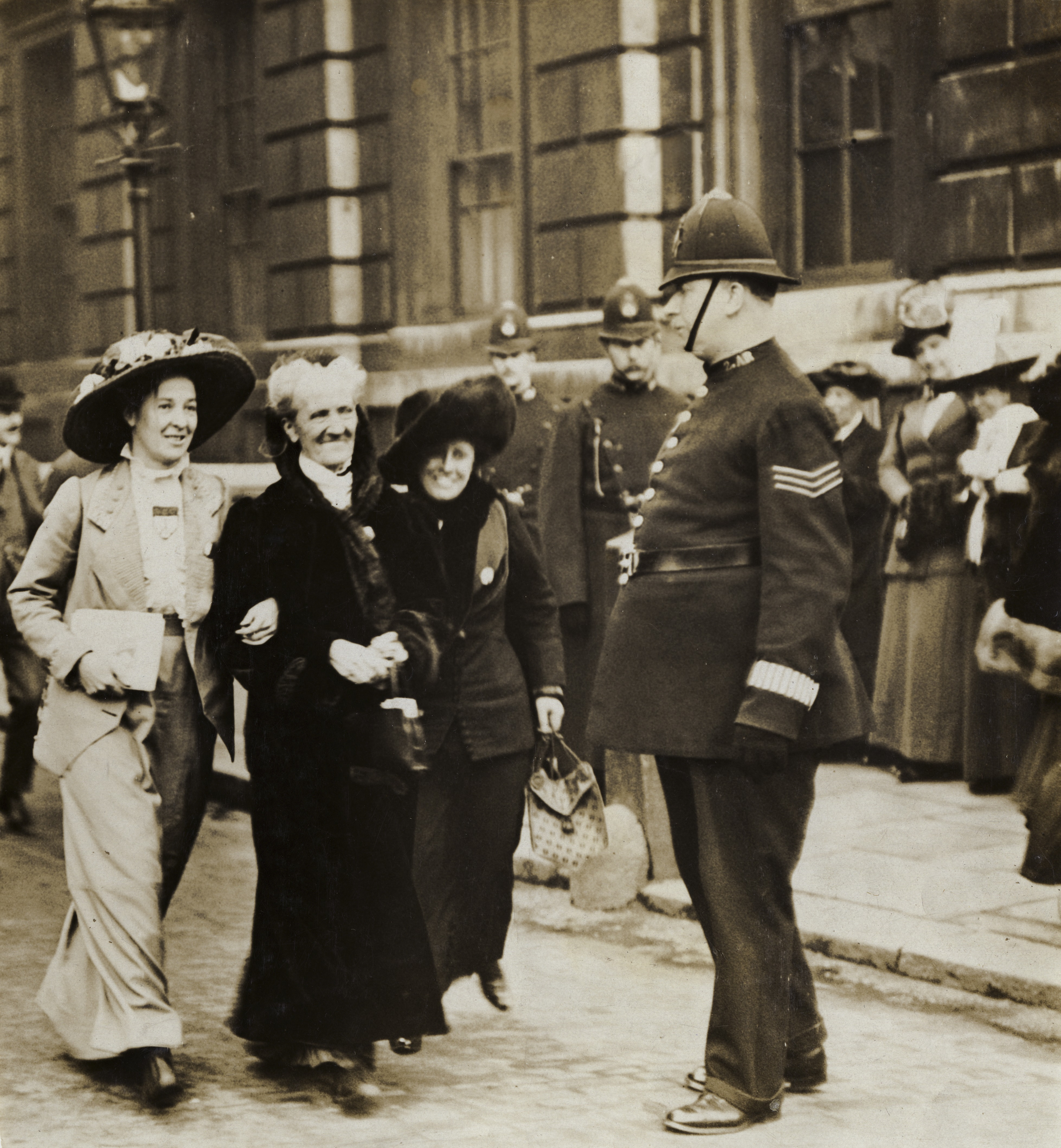
Edith How Martyn, Charlotte Despard and Emma Sproson in about 1914

How-Martyn's next political act was to stand as an independent candidate in Hendon in the 1918 general election, an attempt in which she was unsuccessful. She held public office for the first time in 1919, when she became a member of the Middlesex County Council, a post she held until 1922. From then on, her interests were mainly directed to the issue of birth control. She met the American family planning leader Margaret Sanger in 1915 and had been impressed by her ideas, subsequently organising the 1927 World Population Conference in Geneva with Sanger and becoming honorary director of the Birth Control International Information Centre in London in 1930.

Between November 1934 and March 1935 How-Martyn travelled through India campaigning for birth control, then accompanied Sanger on her trip to Asia the following year. How-Martyn returned to the sub-continent several times in the following years to continue the work started there at this point.

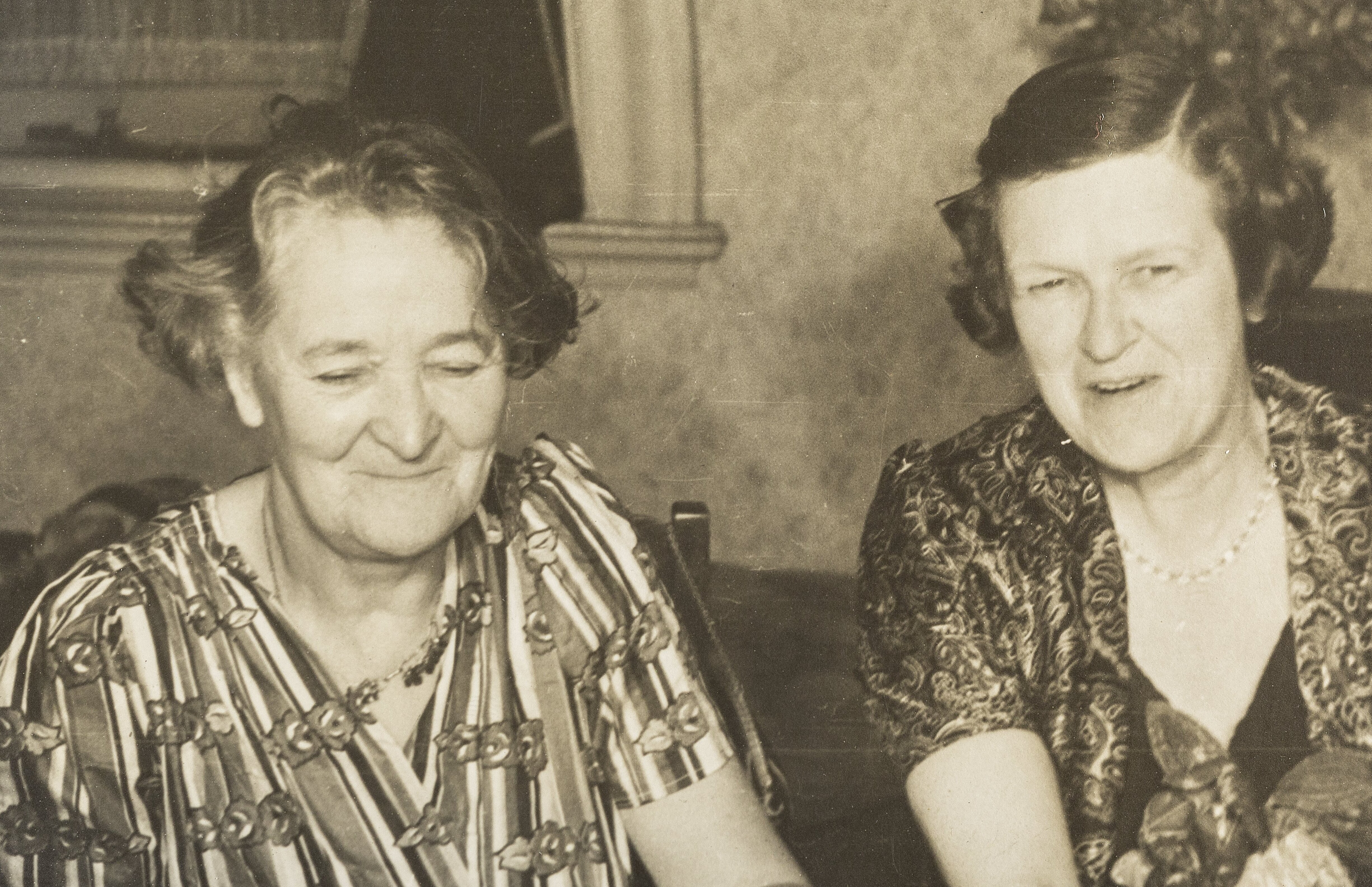
Edith How-Martyn and Jessie Street during Christmas 1941

However, her past campaigning for women's suffrage was not forgotten: in 1926 she also established the Suffragette Fellowship that began the process of documenting the movement. She continued this work in the following decades through a local branch in Australia which she established after she moved there with her husband at the outbreak of the Second World War. Norman Haire, who had returned to Australia, informed Margaret Sanger that How-Martyn hoped to 'join forces with him' to do something for birth control despite the war. Haire wrote to Sanger again on 9 September 1948, asking her to send money to support How-Martyn who was old, sick and poor. She had a stroke and died in an Australian nursing home.

== Posthumous recognition and legacy ==
Her name and picture (and those of 58 other women's suffrage supporters) are on the plinth of the statue of Millicent Fawcett in Parliament Square, London, unveiled in 2018.

How-Martyn collected newspaper articles relating to women's firsts and mounted them in a scrapbook, First Women 1920–1933, that is now held in the State Library of Victoria.

== See also ==
- List of suffragists and suffragettes
