= Leonora Cohen =

English suffragette and magistrate (1873–1978)

Leonora Cohen OBE
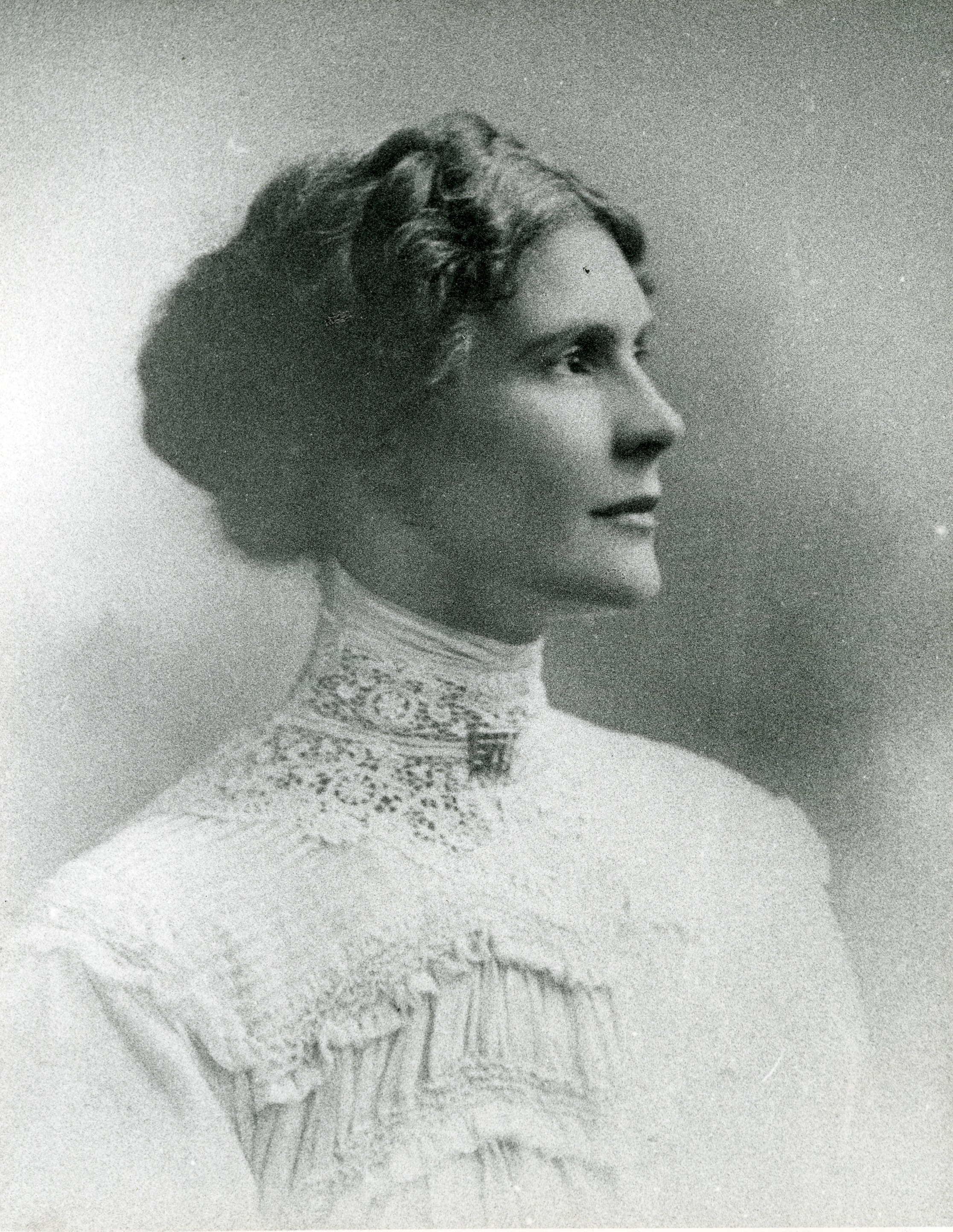
- Cohen in 1909
- Born: Leonora Throp; 15 June 1873; Hunslet, Leeds, England
- Died: 4 September 1978 (aged 105); Colwyn Bay, Wales
- Occupations: Milliner and activist
- Employer: Women's Social and Political Union
- Known for: Vandalism at the Tower of London
- Spouse: Henry Cohen (m. 1900; died 1949)
- Children: 2

Leonora Cohen OBE (née Throp; 15 June 1873 – 4 September 1978) was an English suffragette and trade unionist, and one of the first female magistrates. She was known as the "Tower Suffragette" after smashing a display case in the Tower of London and acted as a bodyguard for Emmeline Pankhurst. She lived to the age of 105 and contributed to the second wave of feminism in the 1970s.

== Early life ==
Cohen was born Leonora Throp in Hunslet, Leeds on 15 June 1873 to Canova and Jane (née Lamie) Throp. Her father, Canova Throp, was a sculptor but died in 1879 when Leonora was 5 years old, after developing tuberculosis of the spine, which left her widowed mother to raise Cohen and her two younger brothers. Her mother worked as a seamstress to provide for the family. Cohen became a vegetarian in 1891 which she remained for the rest of her life.

She apprenticed as a milliner and while she was working as a millinery buyer, she met Henry Cohen, a jeweller's assistant in central Leeds and the son of Jewish immigrants, most recently from Warsaw. Henry was a childhood friend but both families opposed the marriage.

The couple's first child, Rosetta, died in her first year. In 1902, Cohen gave birth to her son Reginald who survived into adulthood. For the next nine years, the small family enjoyed a peaceful life as Henry's business as a jeweller flourished.

== Motivation to be a suffragette ==
Cohen's mother Jane was an influential factor in her life. Because her mother was a widowed seamstress who raised three children alone, it was obvious to Cohen that her mother had few rights as a woman living in Britain in the late nineteenth century. In an interview late in life, Cohen stated that, "Life was hard. My mother would say 'Leonora, if only we women had a say in things', but we hadn't. A drunken lout of a man ... had a vote simply because he was a male. I vowed I'd try to change things." Cohen recognised at a young age that her mother had to overcome huge obstacles in her life simply because she was a woman. It was "her mother's lack of empowerment that radicalised her."

== Actions speak louder than words ==
Cohen made many physical acts of protest against the government. In 1909, she joined the Leeds Women's Social and Political Union (WSPU), founded by Emmeline Pankhurst in 1903. Later, Cohen was part of "The Bodyguard" to Mrs Pankhurst.

In 1911, Cohen joined in a protest where she threw a rock at a government-building window; she was arrested and held in Holloway Prison for seven days. She defended herself in court and, though found guilty, was released. She was also "thumped on the jaw with the clenched fist of a policeman and knocked down under a mounted policeman's horse" at a House of Commons protest. As Cohen began to take more bold steps as a suffragette, her family supported her suffrage allegiance but her friends did not; she received hate letters and her son reportedly faced persecution at school.

In 1913, Cohen protested against the government by using an iron bar to smash a glass showcase containing insignia of the Order of Merit in the Jewel House at the Tower of London. Cohen was arrested a second time and sent to Armley Gaol where she went on a hunger strike. Because of the Cat and Mouse Act, Cohen was released from prison after a few days to allow her to recover from self-induced starvation. Leonora and Henry Cohen then moved to Harrogate to establish a vegetarian boarding house, where they also gave refuge to suffragettes fleeing from the police. She received a Hunger Strike Medal 'for Valour' by WSPU.

In 1913, suffragettes Annie Kenney and Flora Drummond arranged for WSPU representatives to speak with leading politicians David Lloyd George and Sir Edward Grey. The delegates explained the pay and working conditions that they suffered and their hope that a vote would enable women to challenge the status quo in a democratic manner. Cohen told the politicians that women in the textiles industry worked for 3 1/2d an hour whilst men were paid 6 1/2 d for the same job. She explained that voting women would have power to demand higher wages as men had done, which would stop underpaid girls from drifting onto the streets.

Cohen disguised herself as a baker's van man, with Norah Duval as a boy, swapping places when delivering bread with fellow suffragette Lilian Lenton to let her escape from the art critic Frank Rutter's house in Leeds, which was used for recuperating hunger strikers.

The dress that she wore to the 1914 Leeds Arts Club Ball was adorned with suffragette symbols and the logo of the Women's Social and Political Union. The dress is held by the Leeds Discovery Centre.

Cohen became the Leeds district organiser of the National Union of General and Municipal Workers and organised workers in their claims including a three-day strike served a term as president of the Leeds Trades Council. After the First World War, Leonora and her family moved back to Clarendon Road, Leeds.

By 1923, Cohen became the first woman president of the Yorkshire Federation of Trades Councils. In 1924, Cohen was appointed a magistrate; she was one of the first women appointed to the bench and a JP for 25 years. In the 1928 Birthday Honours, she was awarded the Order of the British Empire for recognition of her social work.

== Second wave of feminism ==
Cohen retired to Colwyn Bay in north Wales. In 1970, she attended the unveiling of the Suffragette Memorial in London, and, in 1973, revisited the scene of her Tower of London action.

Since Cohen lived to the age of 105, she witnessed the second wave of feminism in the 1970s and Cohen was brought back into the public eye. Brian Harrison interviewed 183 people, including Cohen, as a part of his oral history Suffrage Interviews project, Oral Evidence on the Suffragette and Suffragist Movements: the Brian Harrison interviews. The collection includes 2 interviews with Cohen in 1974, and a third conducted in 1976. In the 1974 interview, Cohen discussed her role in the 1911 rally and her experience of her first arrest: "[At the rally] it was so packed. And the mounted police were out. And when we got up to the palace gate, I can also remember so clearly the police there on horseback and that is where I was knocked down." Cohen described the violence and huge crowds at the rallies.

In 1974 she appeared on the cover of Radio Times to promote the series Shoulder to Shoulder on the history of the women's suffrage movement; she was photographed wearing her Holloway brooch and Hunger Strike Medal.

Scholars later analysed Cohen's life as a suffragette. Jemal Nath argued that vegetarianism was linked to feminism. The suffrage movement in the late nineteenth century was used as an example. Cohen's vegetarianism, along with other suffragists, was seen as a way for women to spend less time in the kitchen because they did not have to prepare meat, therefore, they could spend more time pursuing interests outside of the home.

== Death and legacy ==
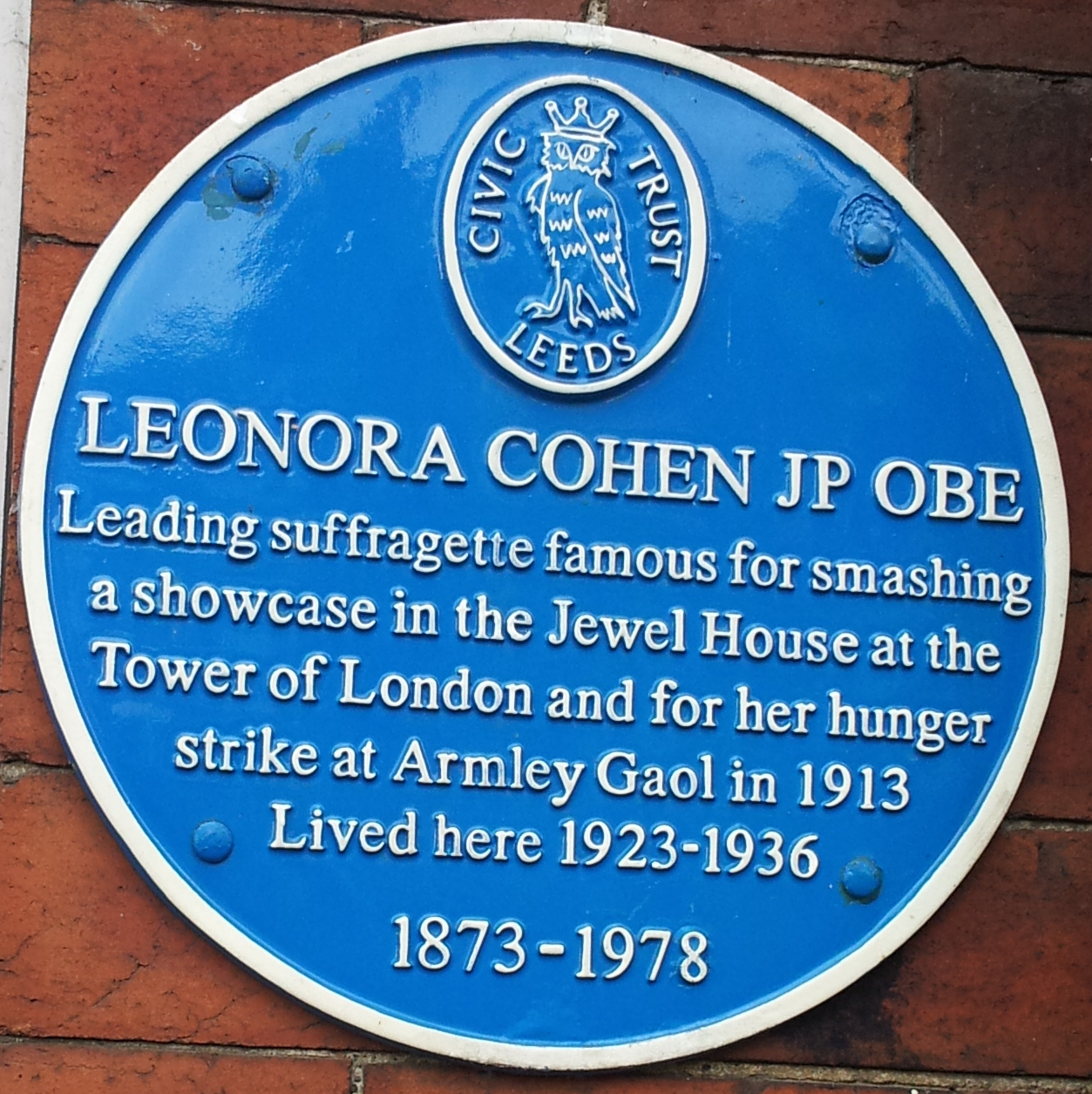
Blue Plaque, Leeds

In the 1960s, Cohen donated her scrapbook, large collection of papers and other memorabilia to Abbey House Museum, Leeds. While her scrapbook does not give a comprehensive account of her time campaigning, it does provide an insight into what inspired her to become a suffragette. Her scrapbook also indicates that she was interested in current affairs because it contained an article about Nurse Edith Cavell's death. The collection included a painting of her as a child by her father.

Cohen spent her last years in a vegetarian nursing home. She died in 1978, aged 105. The Times newspaper published Cohen's obituary. This mentioned her OBE, her job as a bodyguard for Mrs Pankhurst, her imprisonment and hunger strike and her title as the "Tower Suffragette" for the damage she did with the iron bar in the Tower of London. She was seen as a regional activist.

Cohen attached a note to the iron bar that she threw to smash the glass cabinet in the Tower: "Jewel House, Tower of London. My Protest to the Government for its refusal to Enfranchise Women, but continues to torture women prisoners – Deeds Not Words. Leonora Cohen"/ reverse "Votes for Women. 100 years of Constitutional Petition, Resolutions, Meetings & Processions have Failed."

An interview with Cohen on the occasion of her centenary appeared in the North Wales Weekly News. In it, she explains why and when she joined the suffrage movement and her subsequent actions.

Cohen's name is one of those featured on the sculpture Ribbons, unveiled in 2024.
