= Georges Chevalier (photographer) =

French photographer (1882–1967)

Georges Chevalier (né Bernard Chevalier; 2 August 1882 - 1 May 1967) was a French photographer, notable for his work for Albert Kahn and The Archives of the Planet.

== Life ==
He was born in Pauillac to cooper to Guillaume Chevalier and his wife Anne Grégoire. He set up in business as a photographer after being trained in that field by Auguste Léon. In 1903 he was exempted from military service for "weakness". He lived with his father in Bouscat after his mother's death and in 1905 married Louise Émilie Vinatier

He started working for Kahn in 1913, having been put in touch with him by Léon, who in 1909 had become the first photographer to work for Kahn. The autochromes Bernard made were signed 'Georges Chevalier'. At the start of the First World War he was again exempted from conscription by the conseil de révision for the Seine department, though he later worked as a photographer for the military. He took several views of Paris and the areas ravaged by the conflict.

From 1924 onwards Kahn commissioned him to make portraits of guests at Kahn's Boulogne-Billancourt residence. He also carried out commissions for Kahn in the UK and the Middle East and in 1920 and 1924 photographed Brittany for him. After Kahn fell into disgrace in 1934, Chevalier cared for his collection of autochromes without pay and in 1936 was officially made its curator by the Seine department, which took on ownership of them. Chevalier continued to send out photographic missions alongside his collaborator Marguerite Magné de Lalonde (for example to the 1937 International Exhibition) and organised slideshows of autochromes. He retired at the end of 1949.

He was interviewed for Qui êtes-vous Monsieur Kahn ? (directed by Jean-Marie Coldefy, presented by Georges de Caunes) which was broadcast on 16 September 1959 on the first channel of RTF. In retirement he moved to 3, quai du Quatre-Septembre next door to Kahn's former Boulogne residence and died there in 1967.

== Selected works ==
- Autochromes of Brittany :
  - Female inhabitant of Ploumanac'h in a headdress (7 June 1920)
  - Small farm at the edge of the village, Saint-Jean-Trolimon (March 1920)
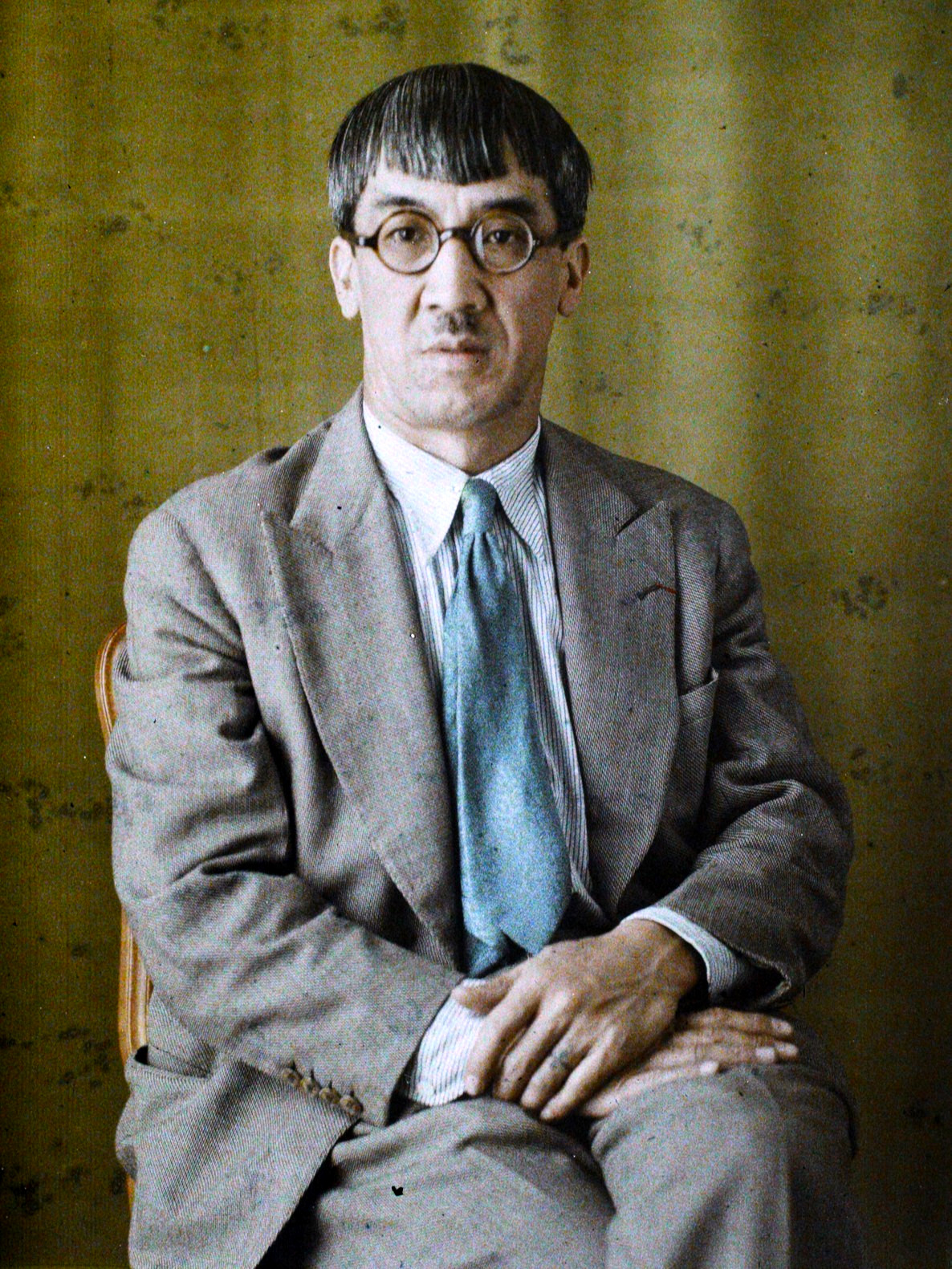
Tsuguharu Foujita, Japanese-French painter

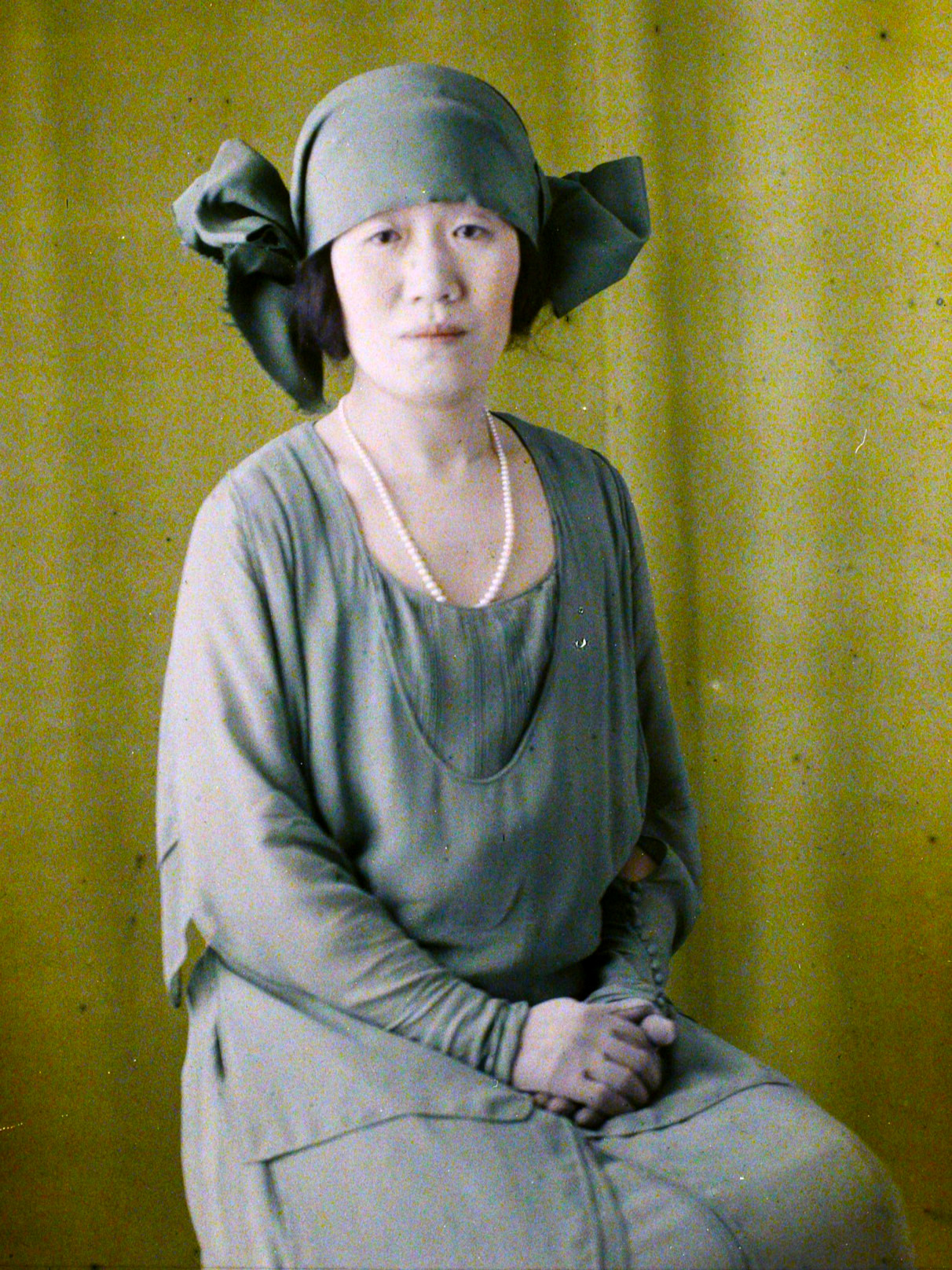
Princess Nobuko Asaka

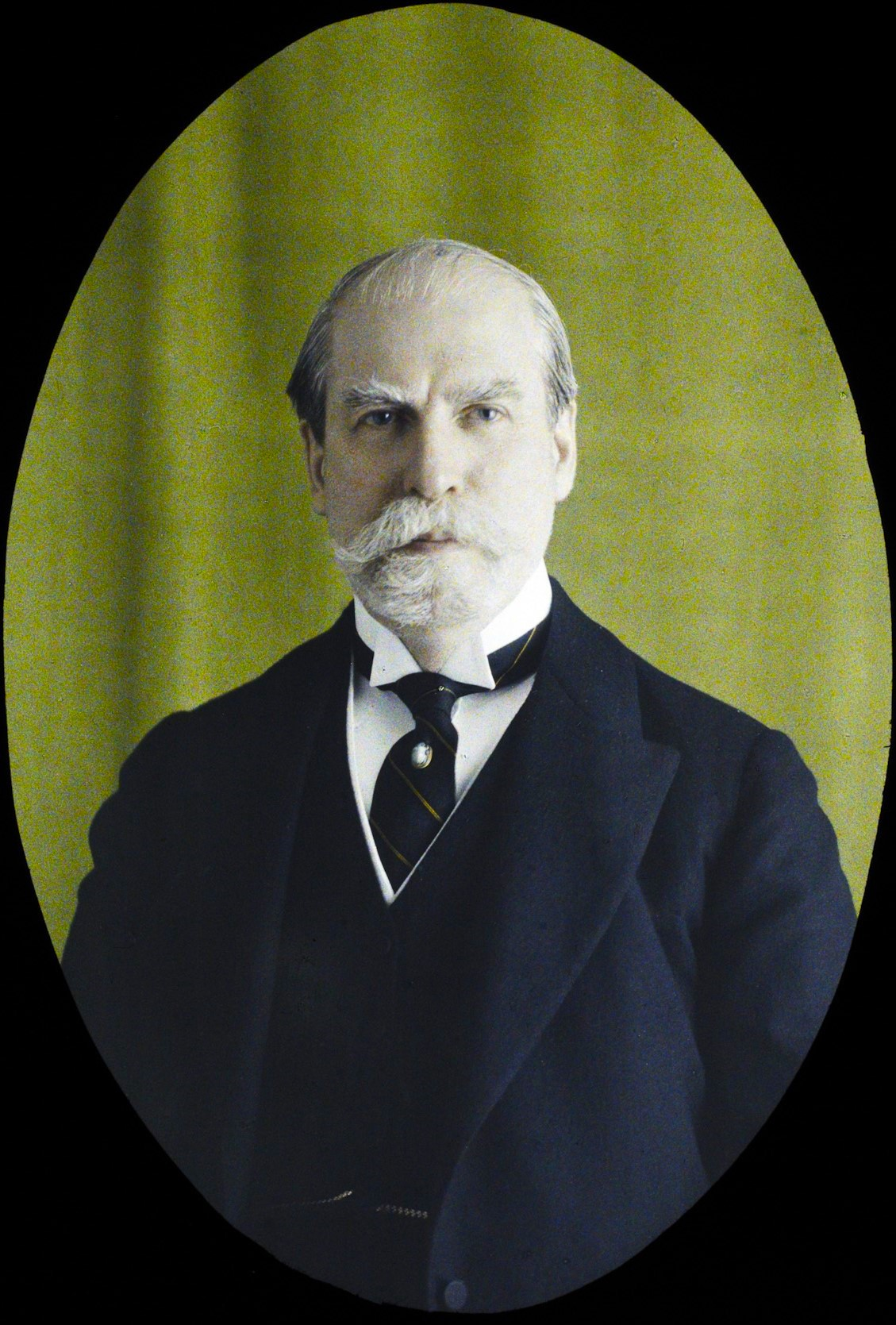
Secretary of State Charles Evans Hughes

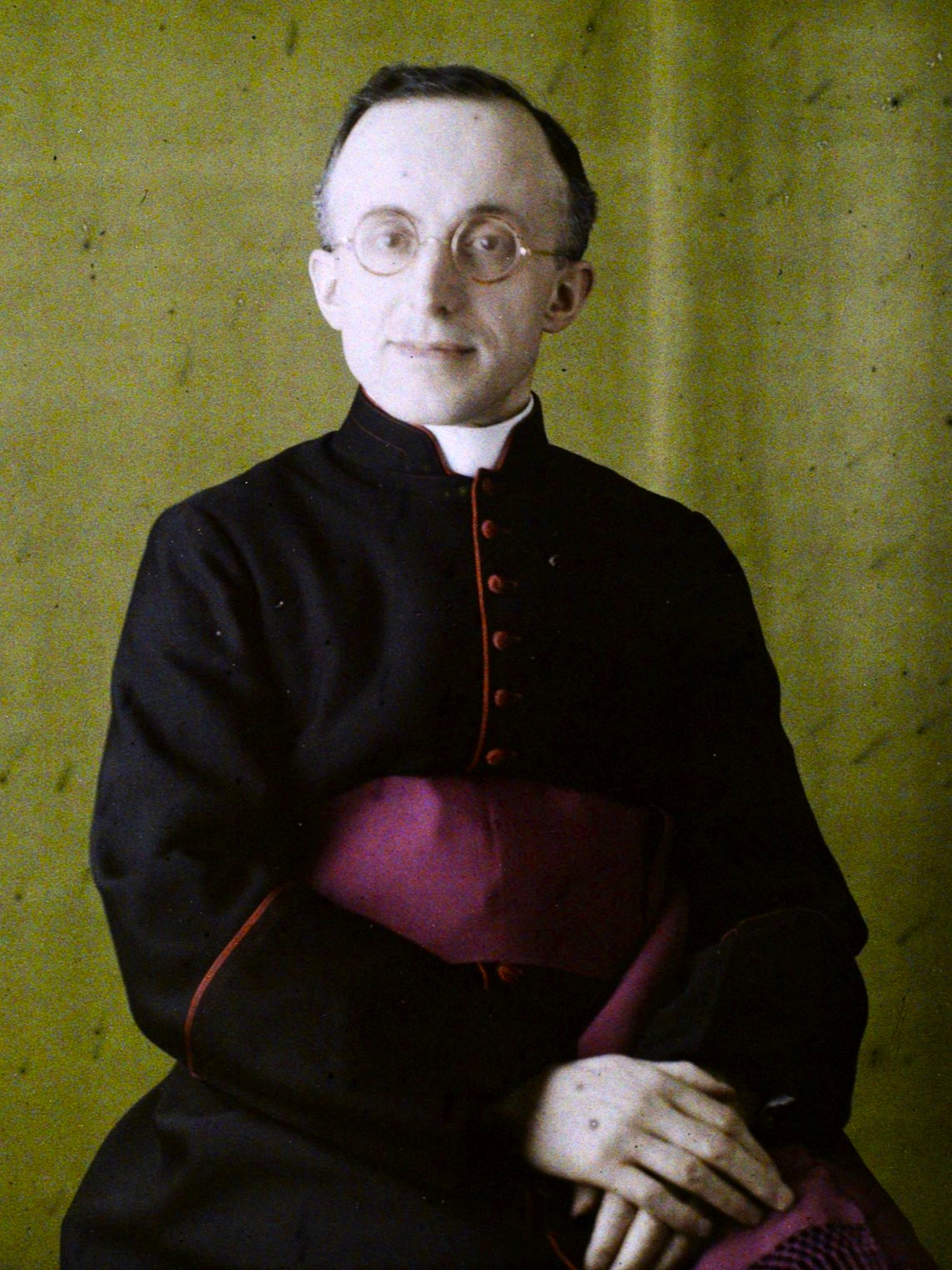
Cardinal Valerio Valeri

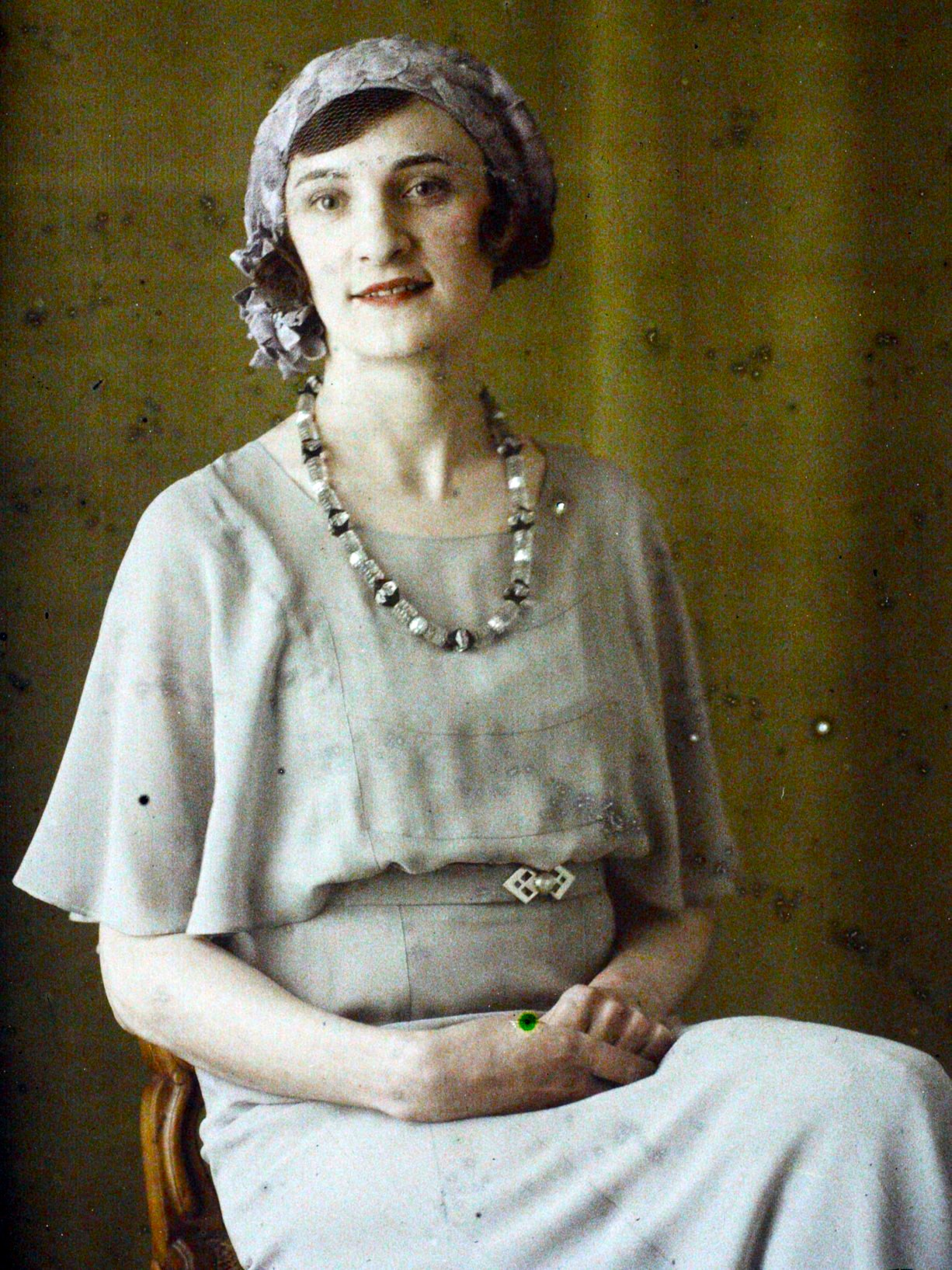
Irène de Lipkowski

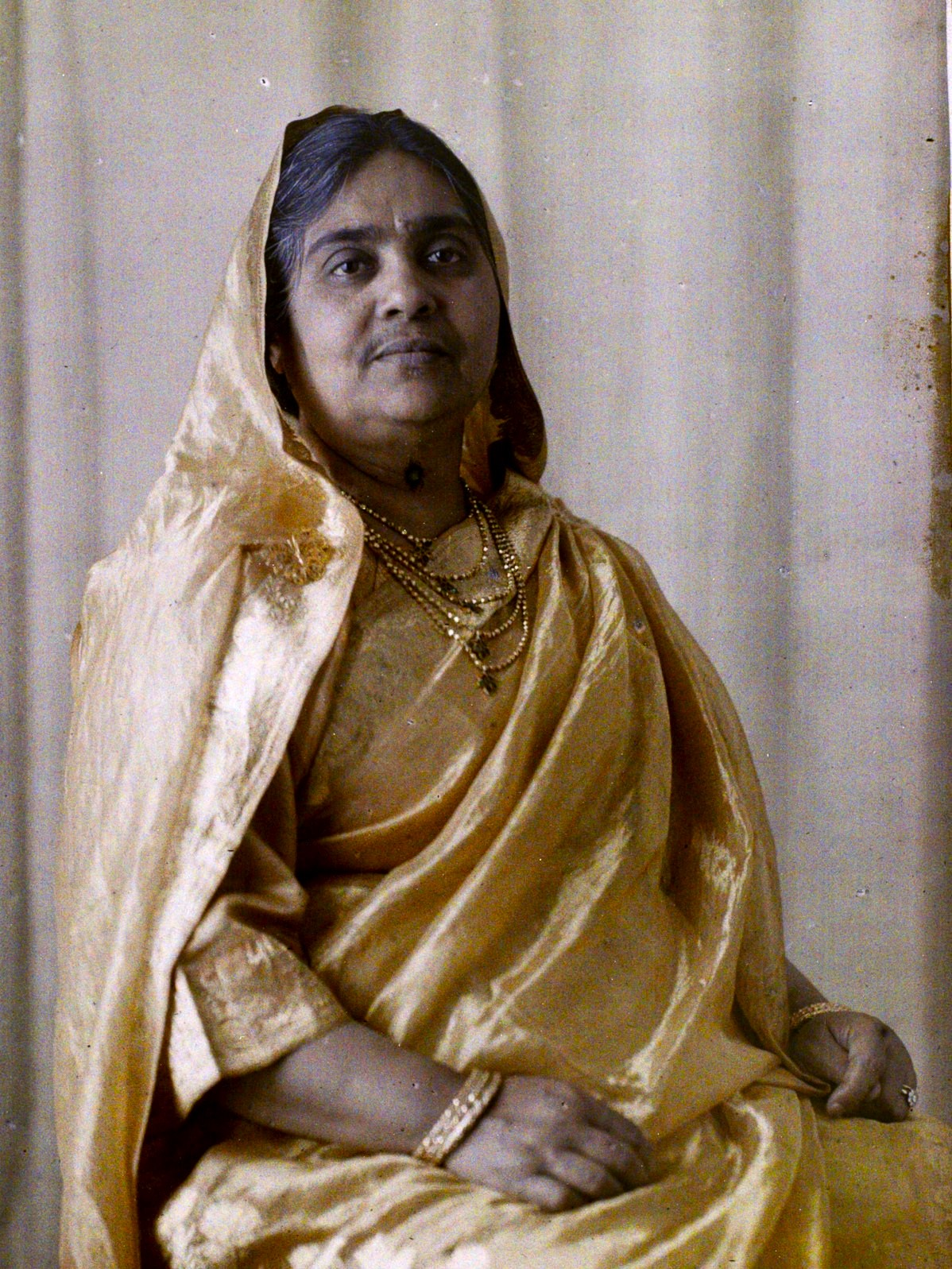
Abala Bose

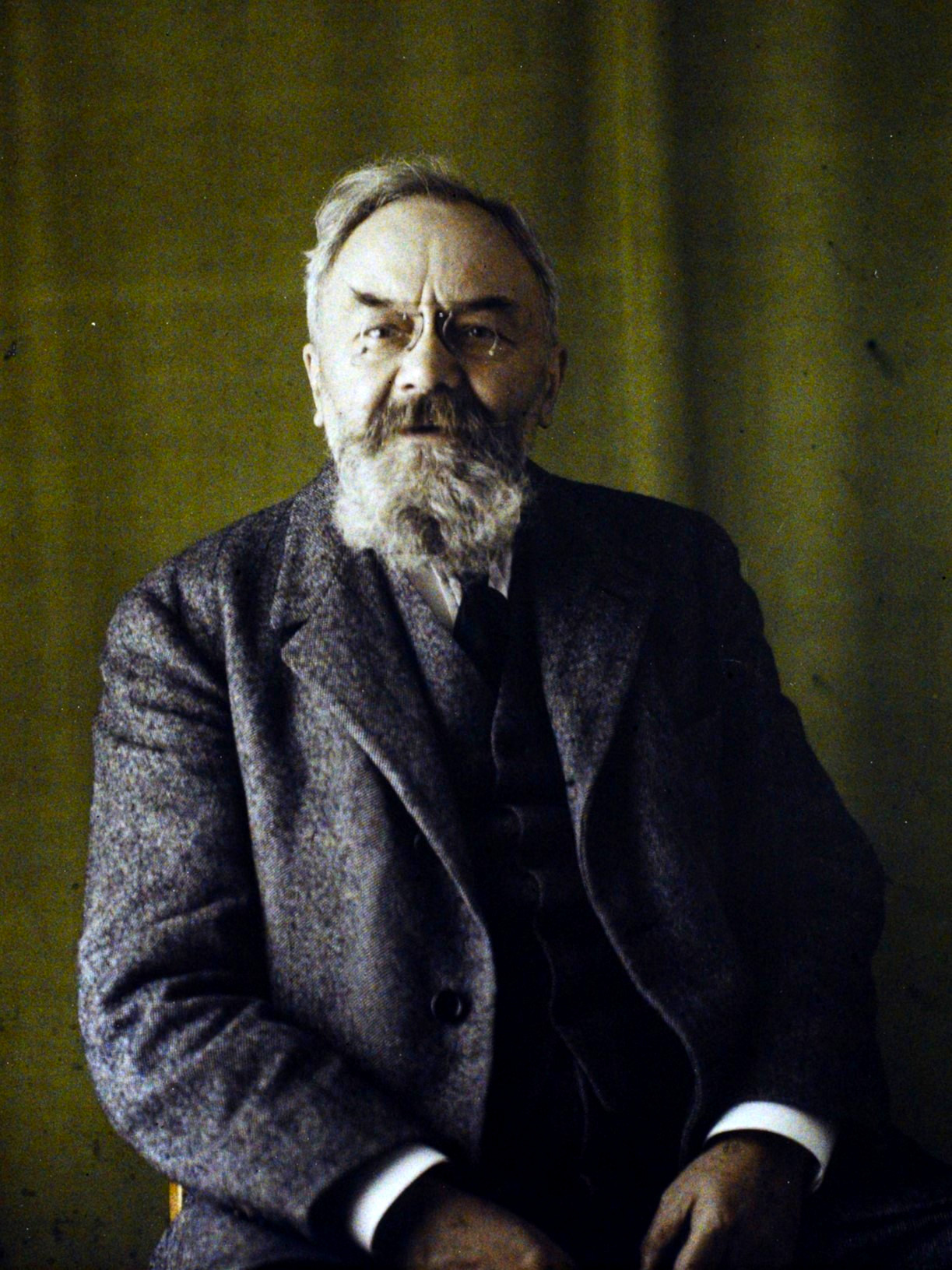
André Michelin

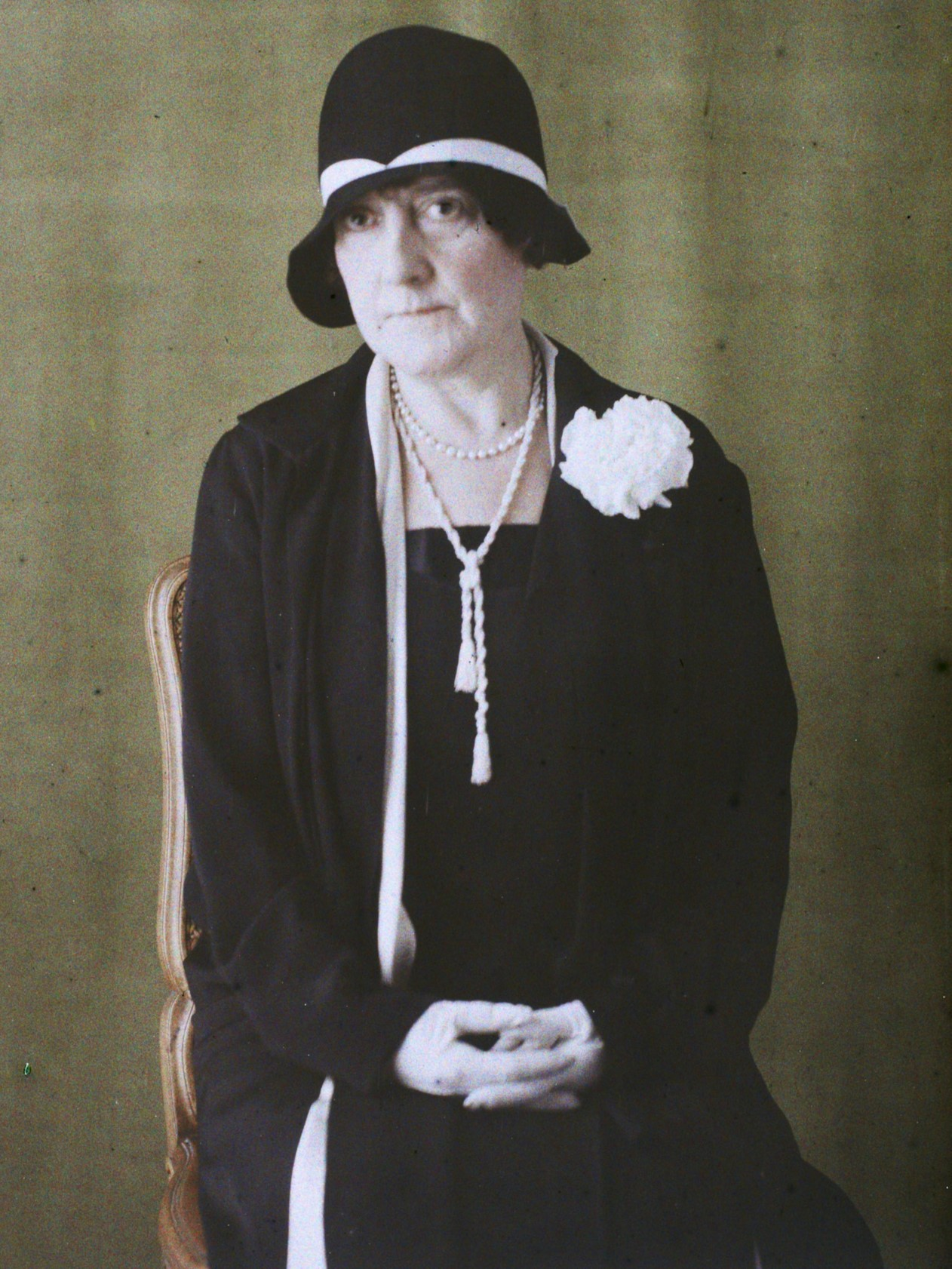
Élisabeth Greffulhe

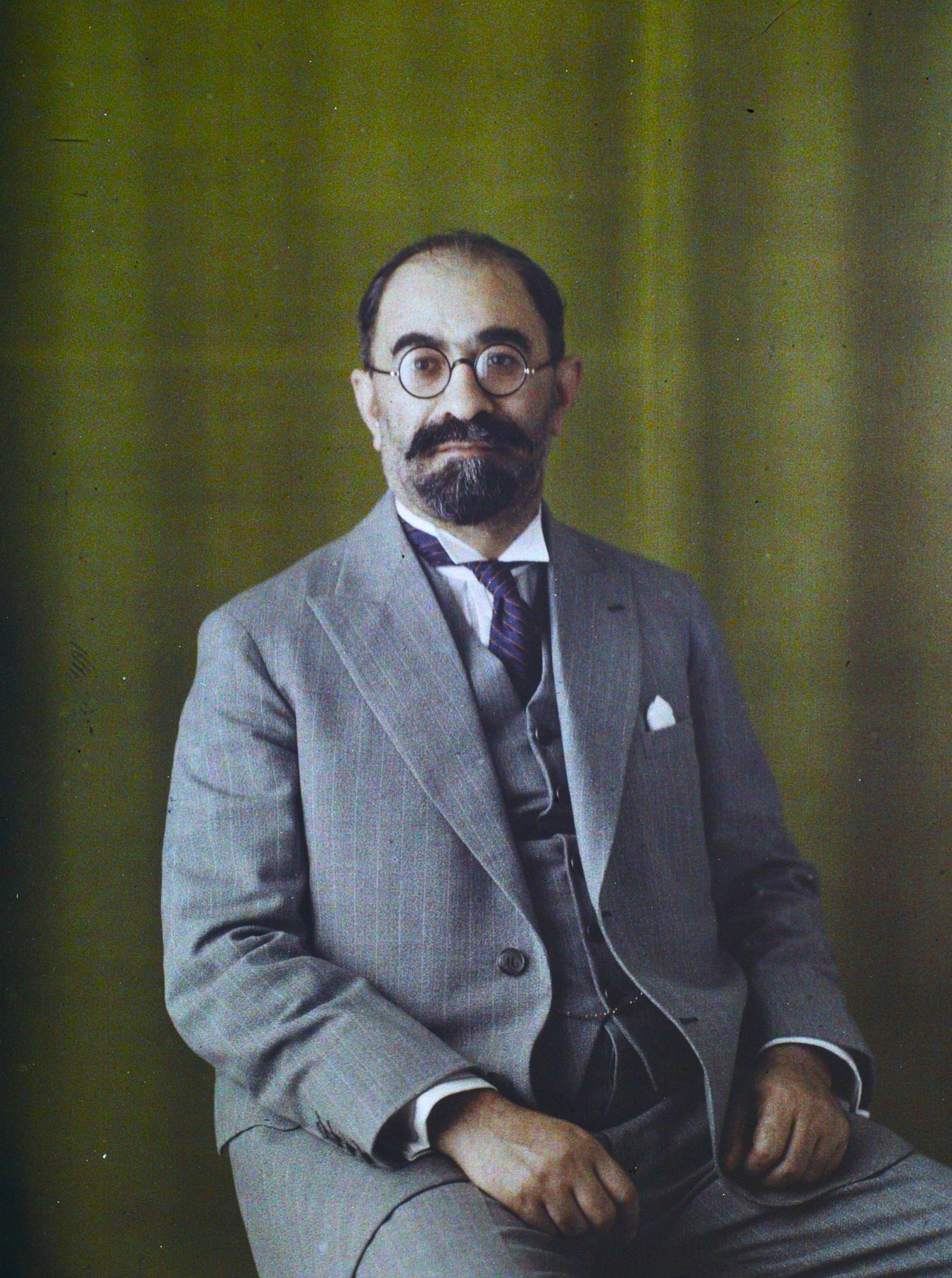
Mohammad Ali Foroughi

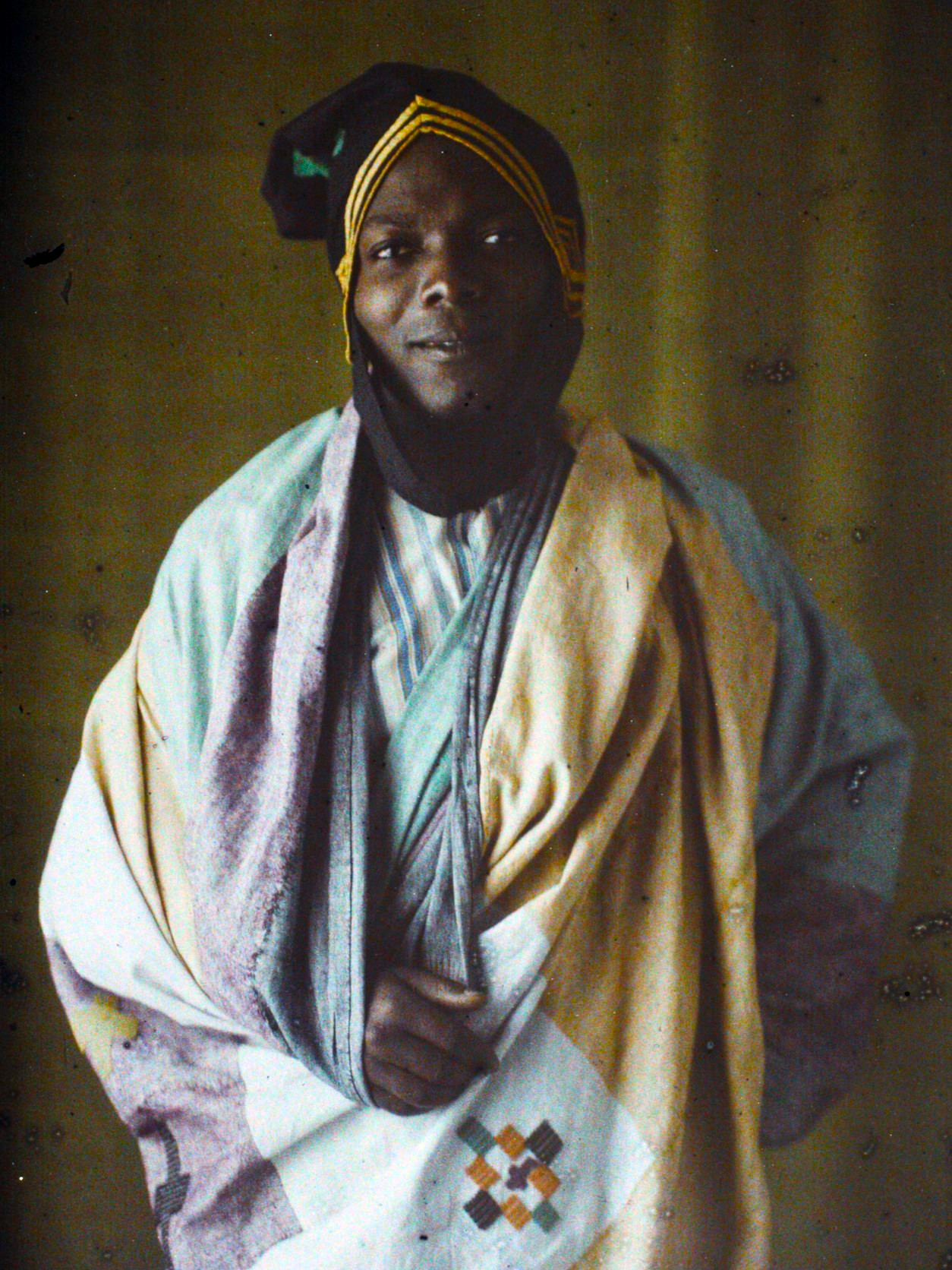
Louis Ignacio-Pinto
