= Louis Montagu, 2nd Baron Swaythling =

British financier

The Right Honourable Lord Swaythling JP
- 2nd Baron Swaythling
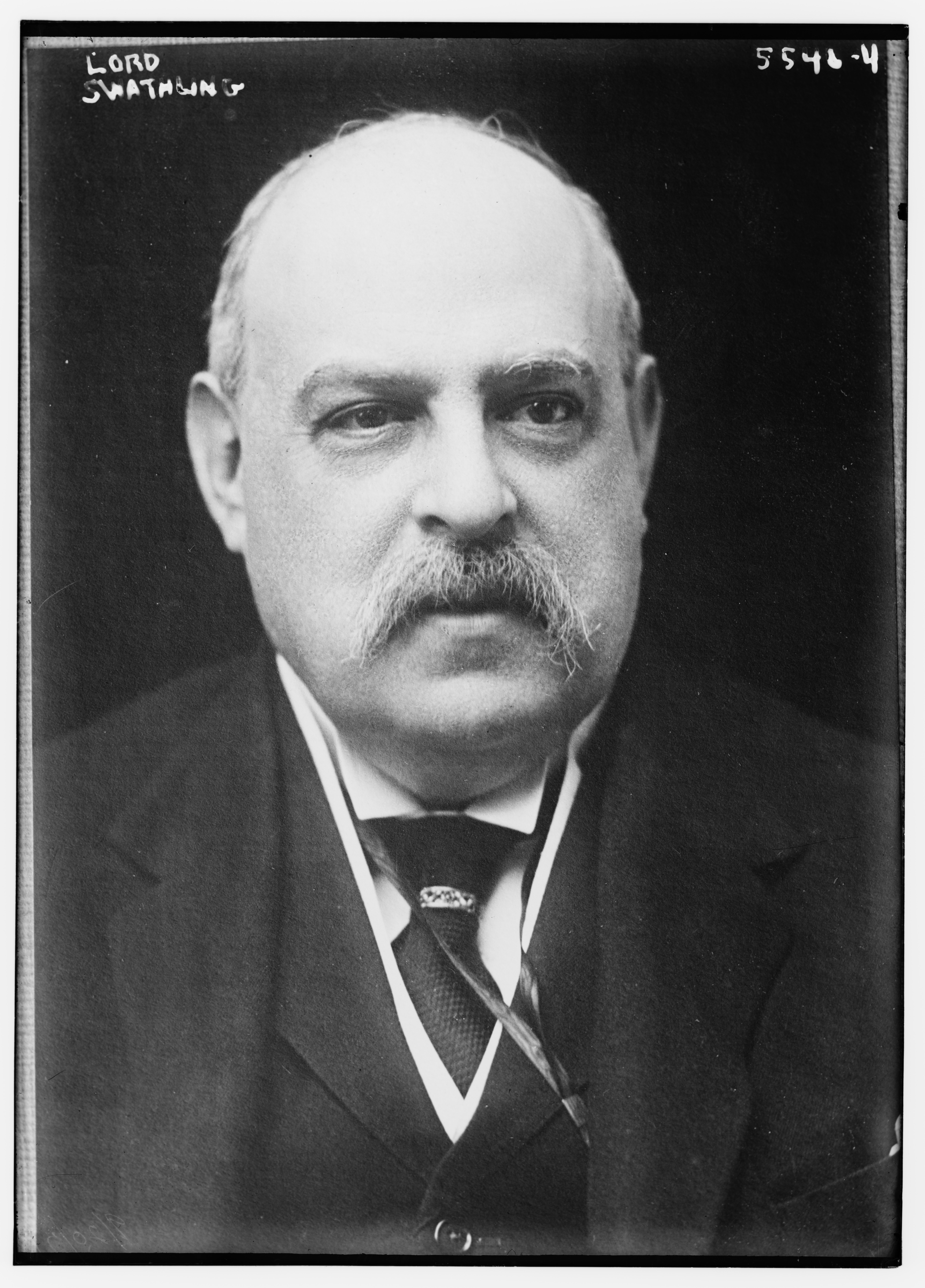

- Coat of arms
- Tenure: 1911 – 1927
- Predecessor: Samuel Montagu, 1st Baron Swaythling
- Successor: Stuart Albert Montagu, 3rd Baron Swaythling
- Full name: Louis Samuel Montagu
- Other titles: 2nd Baronet
- Born: Louis Samuel; 10 December 1869
- Died: 11 June 1927 (aged 57)
- Spouse: Gladys Helen Rachel Goldsmid (m. 1898)
- Issue: 4, including Ewen and Ivor
- Father: Samuel Montagu, 1st Baron Swaythling
- Mother: Ellen Cohen
- Occupation: Merchant banker; politician; philanthropist

Louis Samuel Montagu, 2nd Baron Swaythling (10 December 1869 – 11 June 1927) was a prominent member of the British Jewish community, a financier, and a political activist. He was the son and heir of Samuel Montagu, 1st Baron Swaythling, and of his wife Ellen (Cohen).

== Life and career ==
Born Louis Samuel, he was the eldest son of Ellen (née Cohen) and Samuel Montagu, 1st Baron Swaythling. His father sat in the House of Commons as Liberal MP for Whitechapel before being created a baronet in 1894 and a Baron in 1907. One of his brothers was Edwin Montagu, who also went on to become an MP. His father adopted the surname of Montagu for the family in addition to the original surname of Samuel by Royal licence in 1894.

Montagu was an opponent of the Balfour Declaration. In 1917, along with Lionel Nathan de Rothschild, Sir Philip Magnus and other prominent British Jews, he co-founded the anti-Zionist League of British Jews. He was present at the organisation's first general meeting at Wigmore Hall on 14 March 1918.

He was president of the Federation of Synagogues, until 1925.

=== House of Lords ===
Upon his father's death in 1911, Montagu inherited the Swaythling barony title as well as his seat in the House of Lords. As a parliamentarian, he spoke in support of the decimalisation of the Pound in 1918.

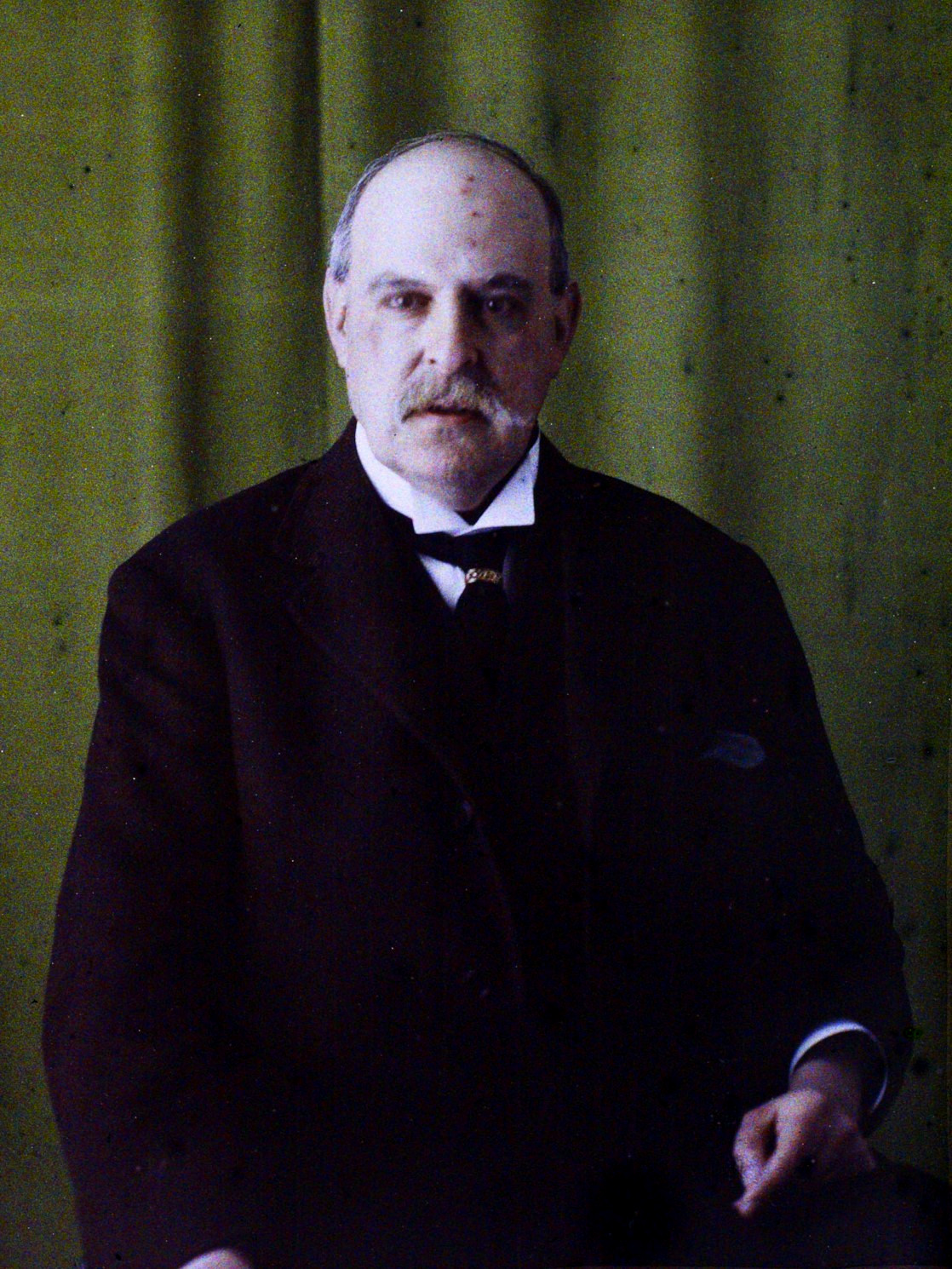
Autochrome portrait by Auguste Léon, 1921

== Personal life and family ==
In 1898, Montagu married Gladys Helen Rachel Goldsmid (1879–1965), a member of both the Goldsmid and Rothschild banking families. Lady Swaythling was active in voluntary organisations, including the Electrical Association for Women and the National Society for the Prevention of Cruelty to Children. In World War I, she supported Belgian refugees and volunteered with the Wounded Allies' Relief Committee, which was presided over by her husband.

They had four children:

- Stuart Albert Montagu, 3rd Baron Swaythling, and father of David Montagu, 4th Baron Swaythling.
- Ewen Montagu, a lawyer, judge, and naval officer.
- Ivor Montagu, a film maker.
- Joyce Ida Jessie Montagu.

Montagu was known to be a strictly observant Orthodox Jew.

=== Residence ===
In 1897 Townhill Farm was purchased for Louis by his father, who continued to live at South Stoneham House. In 1912 extensive further modifications were made to the building by the architect Leonard Rome Guthrie, who returned after the First World War to add the music room and a boudoir for Lady Swaythling. The gardens at Townhill Park were laid out by Gertrude Jekyll and were noted for their rhododendrons, azaleas and camellias.

== Title and honours ==
Montagu inherited his father's baronetcy and barony upon the latter's death in 1911. He also succeeded his father as head of the family's banking business, Samuel Montagu & Co.

In 1919, for his service as President of the Wounded Allies Relief Committee, Lord Swaythling was appointed as Commander of the Order of the Crown (Belgium) by the King of the Belgians as well as being awarded the Order of St. Sava (third class) by the King of Serbia. In 1921, he was awarded the Order of the Sacred Treasure (second class) by the Emperor Taishō of Japan. In 1923, he was appointed as a Grand Officer of the Order of the Crown of Roumania for his service during the Great War.

== Death ==
Lord Swaythling died on 11 June 1927 after having been ill for several weeks.

Peerage of the United Kingdom
Preceded by Samuel Montagu	Baron Swaythling; 1911–1928	Succeeded by Stuart Montagu
