= Baron Swaythling =

Barony in the Peerage of the United Kingdom

Arms of the Barons Swaythling

Baron Swaythling, of Swaythling in the County of Southampton, is a title in the Peerage of the United Kingdom. It was created in 1907 for the politician, banker and philanthropist Sir Samuel Montagu, 1st Baronet. He had already been created a Baronet, of South Stoneham House in the County of Southampton and of Kensington Palace Gardens in the County of London, on 23 June 1894.

As of 2026, the titles are held by his great-great-grandson, the 5th Baron, who succeeded his father in 1998.

== Baron Swaythling (1907) ==
- Samuel Montagu, 1st Baron Swaythling (1832–1911)
- Louis Samuel Montagu, 2nd Baron Swaythling (1869–1927) m. Gladys Goldsmid.
- Stuart Albert Montagu, 3rd Baron Swaythling (1898–1990)
- David Charles Samuel Montagu, 4th Baron Swaythling (1928–1998)
- Charles Edgar Samuel Montagu, 5th Baron Swaythling (born 1954)

The heir presumptive is the present holder's first cousin, Rupert Anthony Samuel Montagu (born 1965), grandson of the 3rd Baron through his younger son, the Hon. Anthony Trevor Samuel Montagu (1931–2010).

== Extended family ==
- Edwin Montagu, second son of the 1st Baron, was a Liberal politician and the husband of Venetia Stanley.
- The medical researcher Philip D'Arcy Hart was the grandson of the 1st Baron.
- Ewen Montagu, second son of the 2nd Baron, was a judge, writer and intelligence officer.
- Ivor Montagu, third son of the 2nd Baron, was a film maker.
- The politicians Sir Stuart Samuel, 1st Baronet and Herbert Samuel, 1st Viscount Samuel were nephews of the 1st Baron.

=== Title succession chart ===
Title succession chart, Barons Swaythling

Samuel Montagu; 1st Baron Swaythling; 1832–1911
Louis Montagu; 2nd Baron Swaythling; 1869–1927
Stuart Montagu; 3rd Baron Swaythling; 1898–1990
David Montagu; 4th Baron Swaythling; 1928–1998	Hon. Anthony Montagu; 1931–2010
Charles Montagu; 5th Baron Swaythling born 1954	Rupert Montagu born 1965
Henry Montagu born 2008

== See also ==
- Viscount Samuel
- Samuel baronets
- Swaythling

== Notes ==
Baronetage of the United Kingdom
Preceded by Cowan baronets	Montagu baronets of South Stoneham House and Kensington Palace Gardens; 23 June 1894	Succeeded by Glen-Coats baronets
