= Julie Franchet =

French photographer (born 1983)

- Born: 1983 (age 42–43); Paris, France
- Occupations: Photographer and teacher
- Known for: Photographic documentaries
- Notable work: Family Spirit: The Son's Preference

Julie Franchet (born 1983) is a French photographer, best known for documentary series and for her work in Armenia, for which she has won several awards.

== Early life ==
Franchet was born in 1983 in Paris but spent her childhood in the department of Sarthe. After obtaining a bachelor's degree in performing arts at the University of Caen Normandy she studied photography at the École supérieure des Arts de la Ville de Liège in Belgium.

== Career ==
Among the documentary series produced by Franchet are:

- Solidarity with Women and Gender Minorities who are Victims of Violence. 2025. Ahead of the International Day for the Elimination of Violence Against Women, numerous groups from Franchet's home region gathered in the centre of Le Mans to mourn the 149 women who had died since the beginning of the year.
- The Oyster Farmers of Normandy. 2024. In Saint-Vaast-la-Hougue, the oyster farmers brave the rain and early morning cold in their oyster farm. Franchet photographs a profession in which few want to work while consumer demand is constantly increasing.
- Next to the enemy. Syunik area, Armenia. 2022. After the war of 2020 between Armenia and Azerbaijan, in the Syunik Province of Nagorno-Karabakh, Armenia, a small village of 160 lies on the edge of a new border. In a fragile peace, life goes on despite the presence of the Armenian army.
- Family Spirit: The Son's Preference. 2019. The Gegharkunik Province of Armenia remains a patriarchal society. The son is considered the one who will work to support the family, while the daughter is expected to support her in-laws. This sex differentiation has detrimental consequences. In January 2019, the region recorded 111 male births compared to only 70 female births. Despite government efforts, abortion of girl foetuses is common. Women are expected to marry young and give birth to at least one son. Such patriarchal laws are often imposed by women themselves. For this work, Franchet was awarded the Grand Prize at Les femmes s'exposent, an annual photography festival at Houlgate in France, devoted to the work of women. In 2020 she won the Friends of the Albert-Kahn Museum photography award for the same series.
- Belarus: Memory of Sovietism. 2019. Torn between its history and a desire for modernity, Belarus, which became independent in 1991, still seems to be a country dominated by Soviet ideology.
- Yellow vests protests at the Arc de Triomphe. 2018. This reports on the third time the "yellow vests" gathered in Paris to protest against the rise of fuel prices, against low pensions and in favour of a tax on large fortunes.
- The last of the Grandmontines, a hermit's life. 2016. This looks at the lives of three hermit monks of the Order of Grandmont.
- This is My Home. 2008, portrays the accommodation of undocumented immigrants in France.

In addition to her photography, Franchet organises photography workshops for children.

== Private life ==
Franchet lives in Belforêt-en-Perche in the Orne department, where she shares an atelier with her artist partner, Thomas Leterrier.
