= Samuel Montagu, 1st Baron Swaythling =

British banker (1832–1911)

The Lord Swaythling

1st Baron Swaythling

Member of the House of Lords
- Lords Temporal
- Hereditary peer 22 July 1907 – 12 January 1911
- Preceded by: Barony created
- Succeeded by: Louis Montagu, 2nd Baron Swaythling

Member of Parliament
- In office 1885–1900
- Preceded by: constituency created
- Succeeded by: Stuart Samuel
- Constituency: Whitechapel

Personal details
- Born: Montagu Samuel; 21 December 1832
- Died: 12 January 1911 (aged 78)
- Party: Liberal
- Spouse(s): Ellen, née Cohen (m. 1862)
- Children: 10, including Henrietta, Louis, Lily, and Edwin
- Occupation: Merchant banker; politician; philanthropist
- Known for: Founder of Samuel Montagu & Co.

Samuel Montagu, 1st Baron Swaythling (21 December 1832 – 12 January 1911), was a British banker who founded the bank of Samuel Montagu & Co. He was a philanthropist and Liberal politician who sat in the House of Commons from 1885 to 1900, and was later raised to the peerage. Montagu identified himself with Orthodox Judaism, and devoted himself to social services and advancing Jewish institutions.

== Early life ==
Montagu was born in Liverpool as Montagu Samuel, the second son of Louis Samuel (1794–1859), a watchmaker of Liverpool, and his wife, Henrietta Israel, daughter of Israel Israel of Bury Street, St. Mary Axe, London. He was educated at the High School of Liverpool Mechanics' Institute as Samuel Montagu. In 1853 he founded the bank of Samuel Montagu & Co. At first the company concentrated on the exchange of coins, bullion and the collection of foreign coupons. Later the firm also dealt in foreign bills of exchange.

== Jewish causes ==
Montagu's commitment to Jewish causes included both initiatives aimed at improving the lot of Jews in England, and his participation in the proto-Zionist "Lovers of Zion" movement. He was involved in founding new synagogues, and in establishing the Federation of Synagogues in 1887, which was an umbrella body for the small Orthodox congregations in the East End of London. By 1911, the Federation represented 51 London congregations (6,000 male members), which made it the largest synagogal body in UK (larger, by around 1,000 male seat-holders, than the United Synagogue). This rapid growth brought Montagu into conflict with Nathan Rothschild, 1st Baron Rothschild, and the United Synagogue. Montagu's funding helped the Federation secure the services of distinguished rabbinical scholars such as Dr Mayer Lerner of Wurzheim in 1890 and the Maggid of Kamenitsk, Chaim Zundel Maccoby.

In 1889 Montagu stated that

"one of the principal objects of the Federation was to endeavour to raise the social condition of the Jews in East London and to prevent anything like anarchy and socialism…The blessings of the Patriarchs that they would increase their cattle and amass wealth, and the prophecy would never cease out of the land, were in themselves evidence that Judaism did not recognise anything like social equality amongst all classes of people."

Historian Geoffrey Alderman has described the Federation as the 'largest single instrument of Anglicization, as well as social control, that Anglo-Jewry possessed.'

== Political life ==
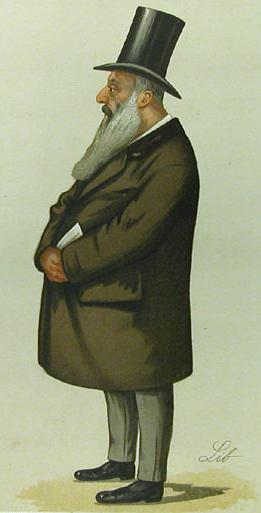
Caricature of Samuel Montagu, by Liborio Prosperi, 1886

Montagu was elected at the 1885 general election Liberal Member of Parliament (MP) for Whitechapel, and held the seat until 1900. His campaign in 1885 was run against his brother-in-law, Lionel Louis Cohen, who was controversially running as a Conservative. As a Yiddish-speaker, Montagu was able to appeal to the many immigrants within his constituency on religious grounds, arguing in 1886 that he hoped "not a single Jew would vote Conservative". From 1887 to 1890, he was a member of the Gold and Silver Commission. He was created a Baronet, of South Stoneham House in the County of Southampton and of Kensington Palace Gardens in the County of London, on 23 June 1894.

In September 1888, after the murder of Annie Chapman at the hands of an unknown man later called Jack the Ripper, Montagu tried to offer a reward of £100 for the discovery and conviction of the criminal. The Home Office did not accept the offer because that practice had been discontinued. Montagu offered it because the Whitechapel murders resulted in some anti-semitic incidents against the East End population.

In 1893, on behalf of the English "Lovers of Zion", Montagu presented a petition in favour of Jewish colonisation in Palestine to the Secretary of State for Foreign Affairs. He asked that the minister forward it to the Turkish Sultan. The petition was evidence that what was to become political Zionism had already taken root in the minds of both Christian researchers of Palestine, and Jewish activists in search for solutions to the so-called "Jewish question".

Montagu presented land he owned in Jeremys Green Lane, Edmonton—now known as Montagu Road—to the Federation of Synagogues as a burial strip. At that time he was aware of the overcrowding in his constituency, and wanted to encourage Jewish families to move to the suburbs. In 1898, he proposed that land south of Salmons Brook, Edmonton—some 25 acres (100,000 m^{2}) in all—be used to construct 700 houses, to house between 3000 and 4000 people. The houses were to have low rents and to include small gardens, with preference given to those currently living in Whitechapel. He first proposed the project to the LCC, and then Edmonton UDC; both prevaricated. In 1899, after the proposals were rejected, Montagu subsequently gave £10,000 (equivalent to £1,100,000 in 2025) towards LCC housing on the White Hart Lane estate, Tottenham.

In the 1900 general election, Montagu unsuccessfully contested for a seat to represent the constituency of Leeds Central, losing to the Conservative incumbent Gerald Balfour.

Montagu was also a strong advocate for the decimalisation of the pound.

== Later years ==
Towards the end of his life, Montagu lived at South Stoneham House at Swaythling, a suburb of Southampton.

In 1907, Montagu was raised to the peerage as Baron Swaythling, of Swaythling in the County of Southampton.

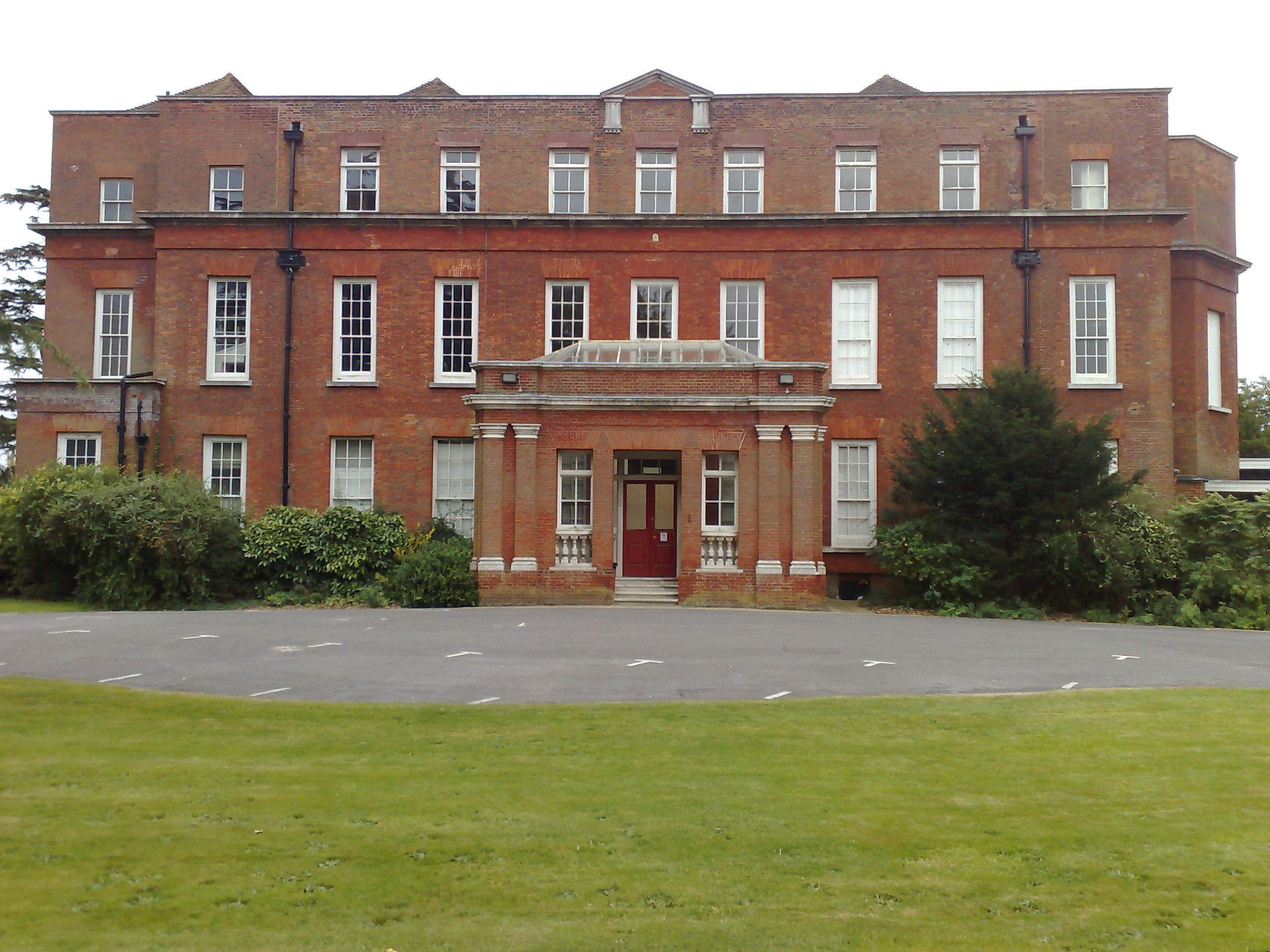
South Stoneham House.

Montagu died in January 1911, aged 78.

== Family ==
Montagu married Ellen Cohen, daughter of Louis Cohen, in 1862.

His eldest child, Henrietta, was known for improving children's education whilst his daughter Lily helped to establish Liberal Judaism.

He was succeeded in the baronetcy and barony by his eldest son, Louis Montagu, co-founder of the anti-Zionist League of British Jews.

His second son, Edwin Montagu, followed his father into politics, becoming Secretary of State for India. In 1915, Edwin Montagu married Venetia Stanley (1887–1948), who in accordance with the will of the 1st Baron Swaythling converted to Judaism upon her marriage.

Lord Swaythling's nephew was the leading Liberal politician and philosopher Herbert Samuel, 1st Viscount Samuel, the first High Commissioner of Mandate Palestine.

Samuel Montagu was the maternal grandfather of the medical researcher Philip D'Arcy Hart and also of the lawyer Walter D'Arcy Hart. He was also the paternal grandfather of Ewen Montagu, famous for his key role in organizing Operation Mincemeat, a British intelligence plan to mislead Nazi Germany with regard to the planned invasion of Sicily in 1943.

Montagu is also the great-grandfather of the 2016 Nobel Prize-winning economist Oliver Hart, the chemist Sir Martyn Poliakoff, and director and playwright Stephen Poliakoff.

== Legacy ==
Located in Kidbrooke, South London, the Samuel Montagu Youth Centre provides recreational opportunities for young people. Montagu is remembered in Edmonton at: Montagu Road, Montagu Gardens, Montagu Crescent, Montagu Road School (demolished) and Swaythling Close.

Parliament of the United Kingdom
New constituency before: Tower Hamlets	Member of Parliament for Whitechapel; 1885–1900	Succeeded by Sir Stuart Samuel
Peerage of the United Kingdom
New creation	Baron Swaythling; 1907–1911	Succeeded by Louis Montagu
Baronetage of the United Kingdom
New creation	Baronet (of South Stoneham House and of Kensington); 1894–1911	Succeeded by Louis Montagu
