= Charles Montagu, 5th Baron Swaythling =

English peer

The Right Honourable The Lord Swaythling

Member of the House of Lords
- Lord Temporal
- In office 1 July 1998 – 11 November 1999
- Preceded by: The 4th Baron Swaythling
- Succeeded by: Seat abolished (Note: Pursuant to the House of Lords Act 1999.)

Personal details
- Born: Charles Edgar Samuel Montagu; 20 February 1954 (age 71)

Charles Edgar Samuel Montagu, 5th Baron Swaythling (born 20 February 1954), is the second child and only son of David Montagu, 4th Baron Swaythling, and his wife Christiane Françoise née Dreyfus. His two sisters are Fiona Yvonne Montagu (deceased) and the Hon. Nicole Mary Montagu.

== Life ==
Educated at Milton Abbey, he married the Hon. Angela Rawlinson (daughter of Peter Rawlinson, Baron Rawlinson of Ewell) on 24 February 1996, becoming her second husband.

He succeeded his father to the title of Baron Swaythling on 1 July 1998. He has a daughter, singer Delilah Montagu.

== Arms ==
Coat of arms of Charles Montagu, 5th Baron Swaythling

Coronet
A Coronet of a Baron
Crest
A Stag statant holding in the mouth a Sprig of Palm proper in front of a Flagstaff erect also proper therefrom flowing to the dexter a Banner Azure charged with a Lion rampant Or
Escutcheon
Or on a Mount proper a Tent Argent between on the dexter a Staff proper flowing therefrom a Pennon Azure charged with a Lion rampant of the field and on the sinister a Palm Tree also proper
Supporters
On either side a Figure representing a Soldier of ancient Judea
Motto
Swift Yet Sure

== Notes ==
Peerage of the United Kingdom
Preceded by David Montagu	Baron Swaythling; 1998–present Member of the House of Lords (1998–1999)	Incumbent; Heir presumptive: Rupert Montagu
