= Gladys Montagu, Baroness Swaythling =

British noblewoman

The Right Honourable The Lady Swaythling OBE DStJ
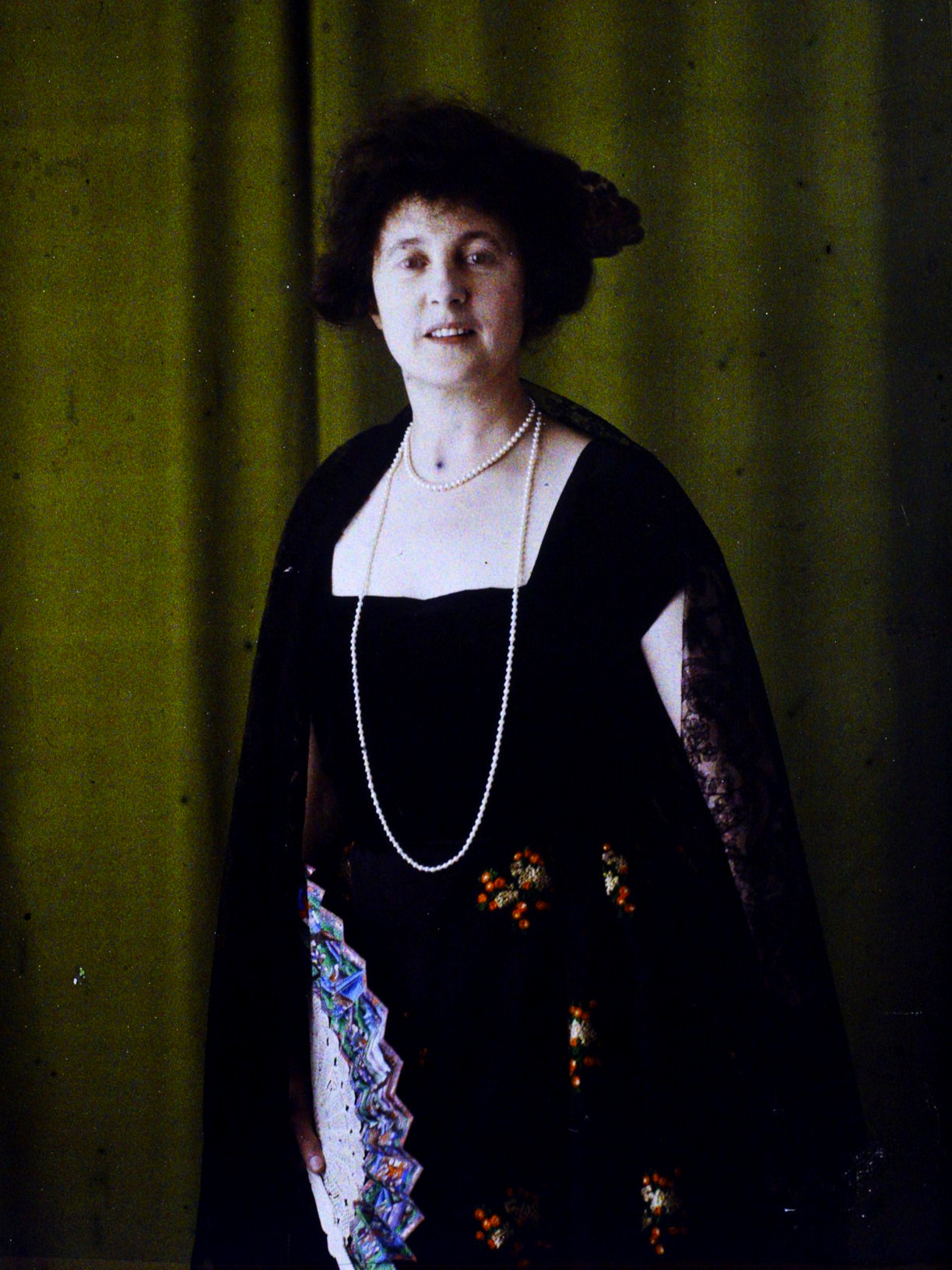
- Portrait by Auguste Léon, 1921
- Born: Gladys Helen Rachel Goldsmid; 4 December 1879; Belfast, United Kingdom
- Died: 1 August 1965 (aged 85); London, United Kingdom
- Spouse: Louis Montagu, 2nd Baron Swaythling (m. 1898; died 1927)
- Children: 4, including Ewen and Ivor
- Parents: Albert Goldsmid (father); Ida Hendriks (mother)
- Relatives: Christopher Guest (great-nephew)

Gladys Helen Rachel Montagu, Baroness Swaythling OBE DStJ (née Goldsmid; 4 December 1879 – 8 January 1965) was a British noblewoman and philanthropist who was a prominent member of the British Jewish community.

== Biography ==
She was born Gladys Goldsmid in Belfast to Colonel Albert Goldsmid and Ida Stewart Hendricks on 4 December 1879.

On 9 February 1898 she married Louis Montagu, 2nd Baron Swaythling and became Baroness Swaythling on 12 January 1911.

She was Officer of Public Instruction at France before her marriage. During the First World War, Swaythling volunteered with the Wounded Allied Committee and Belgian refugees. She also worked with the Ladies London Association. Throughout 1921 to 1962 Swaythling was Vice-President the National Society for the Prevention of Cruelty to Children.

After her husband died, Swaythling was involved in the Electrical Association for Women for three decades, as the inaugural President of the Hampshire branch, acting as national treasurer from 1931–1938 and then as national president 1938–1957.

She volunteered with refugees during the second world war. André Simon credited her with inspiring the founding of International Wine and Food Society. Swaythling was President of the Southampton Branch of the Alliance Française in Great Britain.

== Honours ==
Swaythling was known for her philanthropy and awarded several honours during her life. She was appointed Dame of Grace, Most Venerable Order of the Hospital of St. John of Jerusalem and given an OBE. Swaythling was also a Fellow of both the Royal Geographical Society and the Royal Photographic Society.

== Family ==
Swaythling had four children with her husband.

- Stuart Albert Samuel Montagu, 3rd Baron Swaythling
- Ewen Edward Samuel Montagu
- Ivor Goldsmid Samuel Montagu, founder of the International Table Tennis Federation, to which his mother donated the Swaythling Cup awarded to the men's world team champion.
- Joyce Ida Jessie Samuel-Montagu

She died on 8 January 1965 aged 85 in London.

She was a great-aunt of comedian Christopher Guest.
