= David Montagu, 4th Baron Swaythling =

British businessman (1928–1998)

The Right Honourable The Lord Swaythling

Member of the House of Lords

4th Baron Swaythling
- Lord Temporal
- Hereditary peer 5 January 1990 – 1 July 1998
- Preceded by: The 3rd Baron Swaythling
- Succeeded by: The 5th Baron Swaythling

Personal details
- Born: 6 August 1928 Westminster
- Died: 1 July 1998 (aged 69) London
- Party: Conservative
- Spouse: Christiane Françoise Dreyfus
- Children: Fiona Yvonne Montagu, Charles Edgar Samuel Montagu, Nicole Mary Montagu.
- Parent(s): Stuart Montagu, 3rd Baron Swaythling OBE, and Mary Violet Levy
- Education: Eton College; Trinity College, Cambridge
- Occupation: Banker and businessman

David Charles Samuel Montagu, 4th Baron Swaythling (6 August 1928 – 1 July 1998), was a British peer who held prominent positions in a number of notable British companies. He succeeded to the title of 4th Baron Swaythling in 1990 on the death of his father, Stuart Albert Samuel Montagu, 3rd Baron Swaythling OBE on 5 January 1990.

His photographic portrait by Godfrey Argent was commissioned for the National Photographic Record in 1969, and is held at the National Portrait Gallery. He appears in two other photographs (taken in 1928 and in 1948) in the archives of the National Portrait Gallery.

== Background and early life ==
Montagu was the son of Stuart Montagu, 3rd Baron Swaythling, and Mary Violet Levy. His parents divorced in 1942 when he was 13, and he lived with his mother and her second husband. He was educated at Eton College and Trinity College, Cambridge, graduating with a degree in English literature.

== Business career ==
Montagu held prominent positions in several notable British companies. He became chairman of his family's banking firm, Samuel Montagu & Co., in 1970 aged 41, having become a director of the firm in 1954 aged 26. In 1973, the firm was bought out by the Midland Bank, and Montagu declined the offer of the post of non-executive chairman. He was chairman and chief executive of Orion Bank from 1974 to 1979, director of J. Rothschild Holdings from 1983 to 1989, and chairman of Rothmans International plc from 1988 until his death. In 1990 he became a member of the Board of Banking Supervision of the Bank of England, a position which he held until 1996. He was also a founding director of London Weekend Television for 21 years and a director of The Daily Telegraph between 1985 and 1996.

== Political career ==
As a peer, he took his seat in the House of Lords, but rarely attended, making his maiden speech on 5 June 1990, when he spoke strongly in support of the War Crimes Bill which would have permitted British courts to prosecute alleged Nazi war criminals living in Britain. His speech included the words: “The Jewish faith is centered on the idea of justice, not revenge. Those who believe that an eye-for-an-eye means revenge have no knowledge or understanding of the basic tenets of Judaism. The phrase means only that justice demands equal treatment." He suggested that trials of alleged war criminals would help to keep alive the awareness of the horrors of the past. The Act was rejected by the House of Lords, but the Parliament Acts 1911 and 1949 were invoked and so it became law in 1991 as the War Crimes Act.

== Other interests ==
Montagu was involved with a number of charities, many within the Jewish community. He was a keen racehorse owner (his most famous horse was Zongalero, which came second in the 1979 Grand National), and a founder member of the British Horse Racing Board. He was a bridge player, an art collector and a supporter of the Royal National Theatre.

== Family ==
Montagu married Christiane Françoise Dreyfus, known as "Ninette", on 14 December 1951 and they had three children:

- Fiona Yvonne Montagu (born 11 November 1952, died 8 February 1982)
- Charles Montagu, 5th Baron Swaythling (born 20 February 1954)
- Hon. Nicole Mary Montagu (born 8 November 1956)

Montagu died in London on 1 July 1998 from leukemia.

Peerage of the United Kingdom
Preceded by Stuart Montagu	Baron Swaythling; 1990–1998; Member of the House of Lords (1990–1998)	Succeeded by Charles Montagu
