= Musée Albert-Kahn =

Museum in Boulogne-Billancourt, France

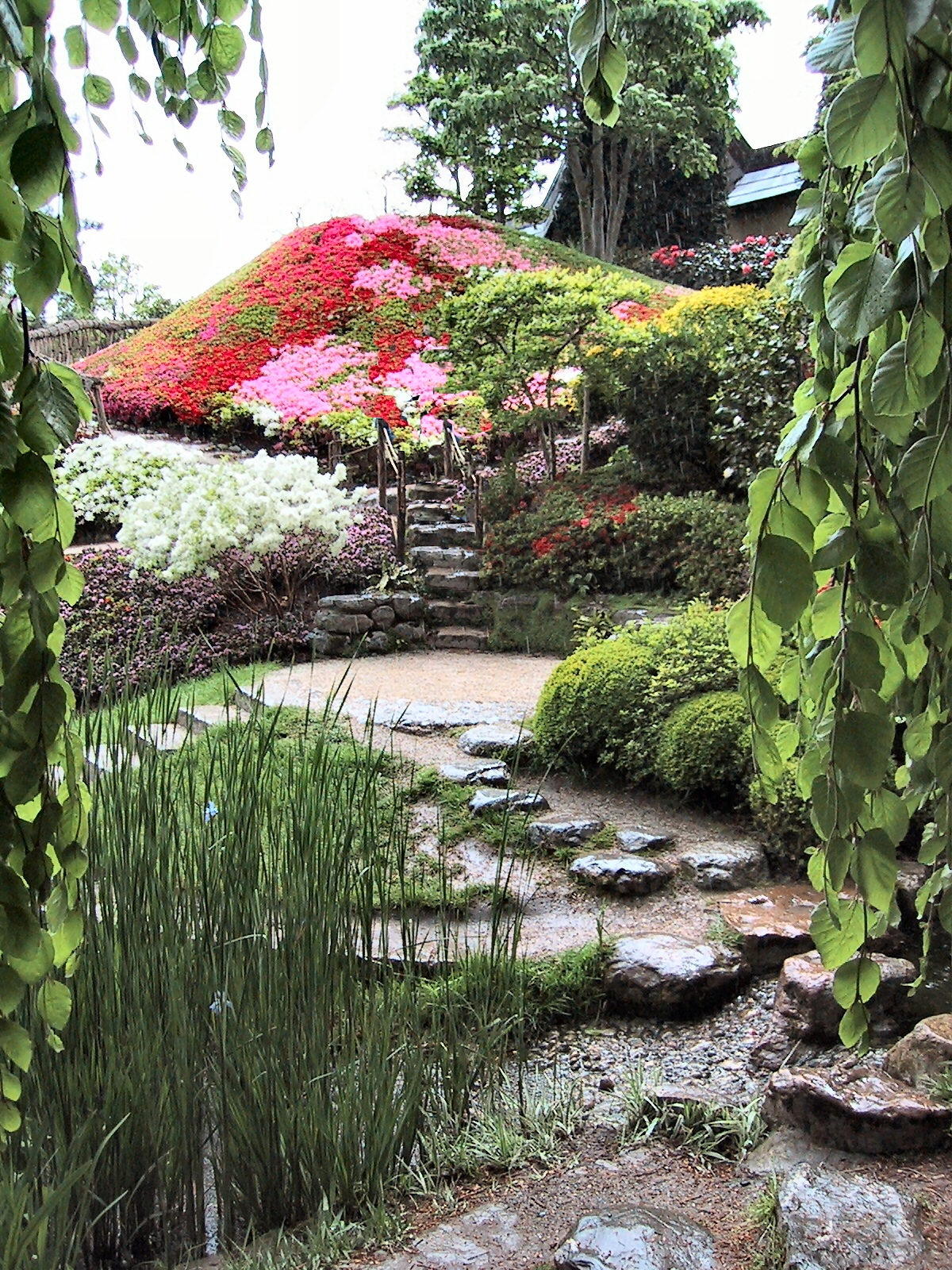
- Location: Boulogne-Billancourt, France
- Visitors: 104,646 (2008)
- Website: albert-kahn.hauts-de-seine.fr

The Musée Albert-Kahn is a departmental museum in Boulogne-Billancourt, France, at 14, Rue du Port, including four hectares of gardens, joining landscape scenes of various national traditions.

With the aim of promoting French banker and philanthropist Albert Kahn's work, it houses The Archives of the Planet collection, built up by Kahn between 1909 and 1931 (72,000 colour photographs on autochrome plates, making it the largest collection of its kind in the world, 184,000 metres, or a hundred hours of black-and-white and colour film, 4,000 black-and-white stereoscopic plates from 50 countries around the world) and a garden of landscape scenes covering almost four hectares, which forms an integral part of the museum's collections.

Since September 2014, construction works are committed for the extension and the refurbishment of the museum supervised by the architect Kengo Kuma with the cooperation of Ducks Scéno for the construction of another gallery of the exhibition and the renovation of the existing buildings, allowing access to the public in a permanent route.

== See also ==
- List of museums in France

== Bibliography ==
- Cluzel, Jean-Sébastien (ed.), John Adamson (transl.): Japonisme and Architecture in France, 1550–1930. Dijon: Éditions Faton, 2022 ISBN 978-2-87844-307-3 OCLC 1346925336, pp. 255–309
