= Albert Kahn (banker) =

French banker, philanthropist, pioneer of photography (1860–1940)

- Albert Kahn at his office in Paris, 1914
- Born: 3 March 1860; Marmoutier, Bas-Rhin, France
- Died: 14 November 1940 (aged 80); Boulogne-Billancourt, Hauts-de-Seine, France
- Occupations: Banker and philanthropist
- Known for: Archives of the Planet

Albert Kahn (3 March 1860 – 14 November 1940) was a French banker and philanthropist, known for initiating The Archives of the Planet, a vast photographical project. Spanning 22 years, it resulted in a collection of 72,000 colour photographs and 183,000 metres of film.

== Biography ==
=== Early life ===
He was born Abraham Kahn in Marmoutier, Bas-Rhin, France, on 3 March 1860, the eldest of four children of Louis Kahn, a Jewish cattle dealer, and Babette Kahn (née Bloch), an uneducated homebound mother.

Kahn's mother died when he was ten years old, and, following the German annexation of Alsace-Lorraine in 1871, the Kahn family moved to Saint-Mihiel in north-eastern France in 1872, where he continued his studies at the Collège de Saverne from 1873 to 1876.

In 1879, Kahn became a bank clerk in Paris but studied for a degree in the evenings. His tutor was Henri Bergson, who became his lifelong friend. He graduated in 1881 and continued to mix in intellectual circles, making friends with Auguste Rodin and Mathurin Méheut. In 1892, Kahn became a principal associate of the Goudchaux Bank, which was then regarded as one of the most important financial houses in Europe. He also promoted higher education through travel scholarships.

=== Later life ===
The economic crisis of the Great Depression ruined Kahn and put an end to his project. Kahn died at Boulogne-Billancourt, Hauts-de-Seine, France on 14 November 1940 during the Nazi occupation of France.

== Gardens of the World ==
The Gardens of the World (French: Les Jardins du Monde) was a garden Kahn created. In 1893 he acquired a large property in Boulogne-Billancourt, where he established this unique garden containing a variety of garden styles including English, Japanese, a rose garden and a conifer wood. This became a meeting place for French and European intelligentsia until the 1930s when, due to the Crash of 1929, Kahn became bankrupt. At that time the garden was turned into a public park in which Kahn would still take walks. The garden brings together distinct traditions (French, English and Japanese), as if to illustrate the utopia of a world reconciled, where different realities can coexist in perfect harmony.

== Archives of the Planet ==
The Archives of the Planet (French: Les Archives de la Planète) was a photographic endeavour to document buildings and cultures around the world.

=== Method ===
In 1909, Kahn travelled with his chauffeur and photographer, Alfred Dutertre, to Japan on business and returned with many photographs of the journey. This prompted him to begin a project to collect a photographic record of the entire Earth. He appointed Jean Brunhes as the project director and sent photographers to every continent to record images of the planet using the first practical medium for colour photography, autochrome plates, and early cinematography. Between 1909 and 1931, they collected 72,000 colour photographs and 183,000 meters of film. These form a unique historical record of 50 countries, known as The Archives of the Planet.

Kahn's photographers began documenting France in 1914, just days before the outbreak of World War I, and by liaising with the military, they managed to record both the devastation of war and the struggle to continue everyday life and agricultural work.

== Museum ==
Since 1986, the photographs and films have been collected into a national museum at 14 Rue du Port, Boulogne-Billancourt, Paris, beside four hectares of gardens on the former site of his own.

== See also ==
- Autochrome Lumière
- Sergey Prokudin-Gorsky
