= Samuel Montagu & Co. =

Former British merchant bank

Samuel Montagu & Co. was a British merchant bank founded by Samuel Montagu in 1853.

== History ==
Set up as a bullion brokerage firm, by Samuel Montagu in 1853, it aimed to make money from the Australian gold rush by brokering deals between sellers and buyers. From 1911 onwards, it became part of the group of companies which formed the London bullion market.

== Ownership ==
After the death of founder Samuel Montagu, the bank passed into the ownership of the family trust, Montagu Trust. In 1967, the Midland Bank acquired a share in Montagu Trust, and so became the first British clearing bank to control a London merchant bank. Samuel Montagu & Co. became a wholly owned subsidiary in 1974, and on completion of the acquisition Midland also gained a majority share in Guyerzeller Bank AG in Switzerland. Michael Samuel Rosenberg was Director of Corporate Finance for Samuel Montagu & Co. Ltd., from 1972 to 1974.

Samuel Montagu's chairman in the 1970s was Philip Shelbourne, who owned a terrier named Montagu, which would travel with him in the back seat of his chauffeur-driven Mercedes. Shelbourne, a trained barrister, had been the first outside director of NM Rothschild, before joining the Drayton Corporation, a manager of investment trusts. Its founder, Harley Drayton, was a well-known City buccaneer. Drayton was later absorbed by Samuel Montagu, to form the merchant bank's investment management subsidiary, Drayton Montagu Portfolio Management. Its managing director was David Stevens until the early 1990s.

The firm decided to enter the securities market buying W. Greenwell & Co., a stockbroker, in March 1984.

== HSBC ==
In 2003, HSBC spun off its private equity business, which took the name Montagu Private Equity.
