= Helen Bentwich =

British philanthropist and politician (1892–1972)

Helen Bentwich CBE
- Born: Helen Caroline Franklin; 6 January 1892; Notting Hill, London, England
- Died: 26 April 1972 (aged 80); Hampstead, London, England
- Education: St Paul's Girls' School; Bedford College
- Occupation: Social worker
- Political party: Labour Party
- Spouse: Norman Bentwich (m. 1915; died 1971)
- Father: Arthur Ellis Franklin
- Relatives: Ellis Abraham Franklin (grandfather); Leonard Franklin (uncle); Herbert Samuel (uncle); Stuart Samuel (uncle); Hugh Franklin (brother); Ellis Arthur Franklin (brother); Alice Franklin (sister); Cecil Franklin (brother); Elsie Diederichs Duval (sister-in-law); David Franklin (nephew and godson); Rosalind Franklin (niece); Colin Franklin (nephew); Roland Franklin (nephew); Martin E. Franklin (great-nephew); Herbert Bentwich (father-in-law); Joseph Bentwich (brother-in-law); Ari Shavit (great-nephew); Benedict Birnberg (nephew-in-law)
- Family: See Franklin Family

Helen Caroline Bentwich CBE (née Franklin; 6 January 1892 – 26 April 1972) was a British philanthropist and politician.

== Biography ==
Helen Franklin (later Bentwich) was born in Notting Hill, London, into a prominent Jewish family. Her father, Arthur Ellis Franklin, was a merchant banker and her uncles Herbert and Stuart Samuel were leading politicians. Her siblings included Hugh Franklin, a suffragist, and Ellis Arthur Franklin, another banker and eventual vice-principal of the Working Men's College.

She attended St Paul's Girls' School and Bedford College, London. Her niece, Rosalind Franklin, established in 1952 that DNA consisted of a double helix.

== Philanthropy ==
Bentwich served as forewoman at the Woolwich Arsenal in 1916. She fought for the rights of women workers and tried to form a trade union. Forced to resign, she became an organiser for the Women's Land Army.

Bentwich and her husband moved to Palestine in 1919, where he was appointed attorney-general under the British Mandate. She organised nursery schools, formed arts and crafts centres, and became honorary secretary of the Palestine Council of Jewish Women. She had mixed feelings about later developments in the region:

I think of the thousands of Arabs, many of them friends of old, now leading wasted lives on the refugee camps on the other side of Jerusalem. And despite my deep admiration for the achievements of Israel, I feel infinitely sad as I remember the Jerusalem where I once lived and the hopes that I had then for a peaceful and united Palestine.

Her nephew, lawyer Benedict Birnberg, wrote a letter to The Guardian stating that she "never acquired a handle and always cold-shouldered Zionism."

In the 1930s she was active in the Movement for the Care of Children from Germany, and was later involved in helping Ethiopian Jews (then called Falashas).

== Political career ==
Soon after her arrival, Helen joined the Labour Party and ran for Parliament at a by-election in Dulwich (1932) and in Harrow in the 1935 general election, but lost both times. However, in the spring of 1934 she was invited by Eveline Lowe to become a co-opted member of the London County Council education committee, and in 1937 she was elected a member of the council for North Kensington.

In 1946, she was elected for Bethnal Green North East and from 1955 to 1965 she was a member for Stoke Newington and Hackney North. She became chairman of the education committee in 1947, alderman in 1949, vice-chair in 1950, and chairman of the council from 1956 to 1957. In the 1965 New Year Honours she was appointed CBE for "political and public services in North London".

== Personal life ==
She married barrister Norman Bentwich in 1915. She followed him to Cairo shortly after their wedding. In 1931, the couple returned to England. They had homes in Hampstead and Sandwich, Kent, as well as a home in Jerusalem, where her husband was a Hebrew University professor.

== Death and legacy ==
Bentwich died at her home in Hampstead, London, in 1972, a year after her husband.

The archives of Helen Bentwich are held at The Women's Library at the Library of the London School of Economics.

== Bibliography ==
- Our Councils: The Story of Local Government (London: Routledge and Kegan Paul, 1962)
- Mandate Memories, 1918 – 1948 (with Norman Bentwich, Hogarth Press, 1965)
- The Vale of Health on Hampstead Heath, 1777–1967 (Hampstead: High Hill Press, 1968)
- History of Sandwich in Kent (Deal: T. F. Pain and Sons, 1971)
- If I forget thee: some chapters of autobiography, 1912–20 (London: Elek, 1973)
- Tidings from Zion: Helen Bentwich's letters from Jerusalem, 1919–1931 (edited by Jenifer Glynn; London: I.B. Tauris, 2000).

Civic offices
Preceded by Norman Prichard	Chairman of the London County Council; 1956–1957	Succeeded by Ronald McKinnon Wood
