= Alice Franklin =

British feminist and secretary

Alice Caroline Franklin OBE
- Born: 1 June 1885; Kensington, London, England
- Died: 6 August 1964 (aged 79); London, England
- Education: Notting Hill and Ealing High School
- Organization(s): Society for the Oversea Settlement of British Women; Townswomen's Guild
- Known for: Leading women's organisations
- Parent(s): Arthur Ellis Franklin; Caroline Jacob
- Relatives: Herbert Samuel, 1st Viscount Samuel (uncle); Cecil Franklin (brother); Hugh Franklin (brother); Helen Caroline Franklin (sister); Ellis Arthur Franklin (brother); Rosalind Franklin (niece); David Franklin (nephew); Jennifer Glynn née Franklin (niece); Sir Roland Franklin (nephew); Colin Franklin (nephew)

Alice Caroline Franklin OBE (1 June 1885 – 6 August 1964) was a British feminist, secretary of the Jewish League for Woman Suffrage and the Society for the Oversea Settlement of British Women, and a key figure in the running of the Townswomen's Guild. Together with Gertrude Horton, she shaped the society from its suffragette roots into an organisation that was apolitical and inclusive, but also provided considerable space for feminist and lesbian women.

== Early life ==
Alice Franklin was born to Arthur Ellis Franklin and Caroline Franklin (née Jacob), the second of six children. The Franklin family was a prominent member of the Anglo-Jewish "cousinhood", and the family was well-off and well-connected.

Alice was educated at Notting Hill and Ealing High School, a private girls' school, and upon leaving school joined her mother at the Care Committee (the social services wing of London County Council). Caroline Franklin was also a member of the Jewish League for Woman Suffrage, and Alice followed her mother here too: in the 1913 Suffrage Annual and Women's Who's Who, she is recorded as the group's secretary.

== First World War and the Society for the Oversea Settlement of British Women ==
With the outbreak of the First World War, Alice joined the Ministry of Agriculture and became involved in the Women's Land Army – an organization of women who provided farm labour while men were at war. In 1916, Alice rose to the role of Head of Section.

When World War I ended, the challenges facing young women changed. Now instead of a labour shortage, there was a labour surplus, and the gender imbalance resulting from the deaths of young men during the war meant that many newly unemployed women could not find husbands either. The Society for the Oversea Settlement of British Women (SOSBW) was set up in 1919 in the wake of World War I to solve the problem of these "surplus women", and Alice Franklin became the secretary of the society. Finding significant resistance to the idea from British colonies, Alice embarked on a speaking tour across Canada to promote the SOSBW to a public sceptical of immigration, and for her services was given an OBE in the 1931 Birthday Honours.

== Townswomen's Guild ==
Alice was friends with her cousin Eva Hubback, Parliamentary Secretary and later President of the National Union of Societies for Equal Citizenship (NUSEC, successor to the National Union of Women's Suffrage Societies), and began to campaign for the organization. Within NUSEC, Hubback was part of an experiment to start a number of friendly societies for women called Townswomen's Guilds. Being too busy to run the Guilds herself, Hubback put the organisation in the hands of Alice Franklin and Gertrude Horton.

During the Second World War, many of the staff at the headquarters of the National Union of Townswomen's Guilds (NUTG) were dismissed except for Alice, who took control of the organisation to keep it "ticking over". The NUTG was pulled in two directions, between a more politically active section drawn from NUSEC and a non-partisan faction who wanted to emulate the Women's Institute with its focus on teaching housekeeping and handicrafts. In order to avoid alienating women who were uneasy about campaigning or radical politics, Alice oversaw the restructuring of the Guilds as apolitical spaces for education, which saw NUSEC split into political and educational wings, although under Franklin and Horton's leadership the Guilds remained crypto-feminist – for example, while the NUTG took no official position on equal pay, the individual local guilds were told to research campaign groups in their areas and encourage women to join. There was an expansion of the Guilds following the War to replace Home Front work that had provided women with a creative outlet. This expansion put a strain on the finances of the Guilds, especially when repair works to the headquarters were also needed. However, Alice's cheeky sense of humour did not always endear her to the local guilds, and the tight control that Alice Franklin and Gertrude Horton held came to be resented by other members, who wanted the management structure to be reorganised and the system of financial controls changed. Tensions reached breaking point in 1948, when Franklin, Horton and Joan Loring (the National Chairman) resigned from the organising committee of the NUTG. With their departure, the last traces of feminism in the Townswomen's Guilds were further diminished.

== Personal life ==
Alice was one of a generation of politically active Franklins. Her siblings were; in order, Jacob, Cecil, Hugh, Helen and Ellis. Hugh was one of the most prominent men in the women's suffrage movement, Helen became forewoman at the Royal Arsenal, where she was forced to resign for supporting female workers and attempting to form a trade union, and Ellis became vice-principal of the Working Men's College. Through Ellis, Alice was also the aunt of the famous crystallographer Rosalind Franklin.

Alice never married, and according to Mary Stott was known in the organization for her masculine dress and appearance and for making cheeky comments to married women about the nuisance posed by their husbands. Some biographers have said that Alice was a lesbian and was, for the era, relatively open about her orientation and dislike of men, although the evidence for this claim has been criticized.

Brian Harrison recorded 3 oral history interviews about Alice, including some conversation about her brother Hugh, as part of the Suffrage Interviews project, titled Oral evidence on the suffragette and suffragist movements: the Brian Harrison interviews. Their nephew, Colin Franklin (and his wife, Charlotte), were interviewed in June 1977. Their niece, Mrs Ursula Richley (and her husband Noel), were interviewed in September 1977. Their nephew, Norman (along with his wife Jill) was interviewed in September 1979.
