= Ian Glynn =

British biologist (1928–2022)

Ian Michael Glynn FRS FRCP (3 June 1928 – 7 July 2022) was a British biologist and a Fellow of the Royal Society.

Glynn was educated at City of London School, then Trinity College, Cambridge and University College London Hospital.

He was Professor of Physiology, University of Cambridge, 1986–95, and later professor emeritus. He was a Fellow of Trinity College, Cambridge from 1955 (Vice-Master, 1980–86). He was editor of The Journal of Physiology, 1968—70.

His work on the 'sodium pump' led to his election to the Royal Society and to Honorary Foreign Membership of the American Academy of Arts and Sciences. Glynn was the author of An Anatomy of Thought: The Origin and Machinery of the Mind (2003) and Elegance in Science: The beauty of simplicity (2010).

Glynn died on 7 July 2022, at the age of 94. He married Jenifer Franklin, daughter of Ellis Arthur Franklin and Muriel Frances Waley; her siblings included Rosalind Franklin, Colin Franklin and Roland Franklin.
