= Edith Ayrton =

British author and activist (1874–1945)

- Edith Zangwill
- Born: Edith Chaplin Ayrton; 1 October 1874; Tokyo, Japan
- Died: 5 May 1945 (aged 70); Edinburgh, Scotland, UK
- Occupation: Writer
- Spouse: Israel Zangwill (m. 1903)
- Writing career
- Notable work: The Call (1924)

Edith Chaplin Ayrton Zangwill (1 October 1874 – 5 May 1945) was a British author and activist. She helped form the Jewish League for Woman Suffrage.

== Early life ==
Ayrton was born in Japan to the scientist William Edward Ayrton and the doctor Matilda Chaplin Ayrton. Her mother died in 1883 and her father married the physicist Hertha Ayrton.

== Writing ==
In 1904 she wrote her first novel, Barbarous Babes. Her other books include: The First Mrs. Mollivar (1905); Teresa (1909); The Rise of a Star (1918); The Call (1924); The House (1928); and The Story of Disarmament Declaration (1932).

== Activism ==
Edith complained of poor health and did not feel that she could be a militant suffragette but she and her stepmother joined the Women's Social and Political Union. Edith wrote to Maud Arncliffe Sennett to tell her that she intended to support the WSPU generously. Her husband spoke publicly in support of the WSPU and was hissed by liberally minded women for his support of militant tactics.

In the 1911 England Census, Edith recorded only herself, her infant daughter and the name of two servants, followed by the following note:

The rest of the household is not entered as we feel that until women have the political rights of citizens, they should not perform the duties of citizens. Mr. Zangwill is not at home.

— Mrs. Edith Zangwill, 1911 England Census

== Jewish League for Woman Suffrage ==
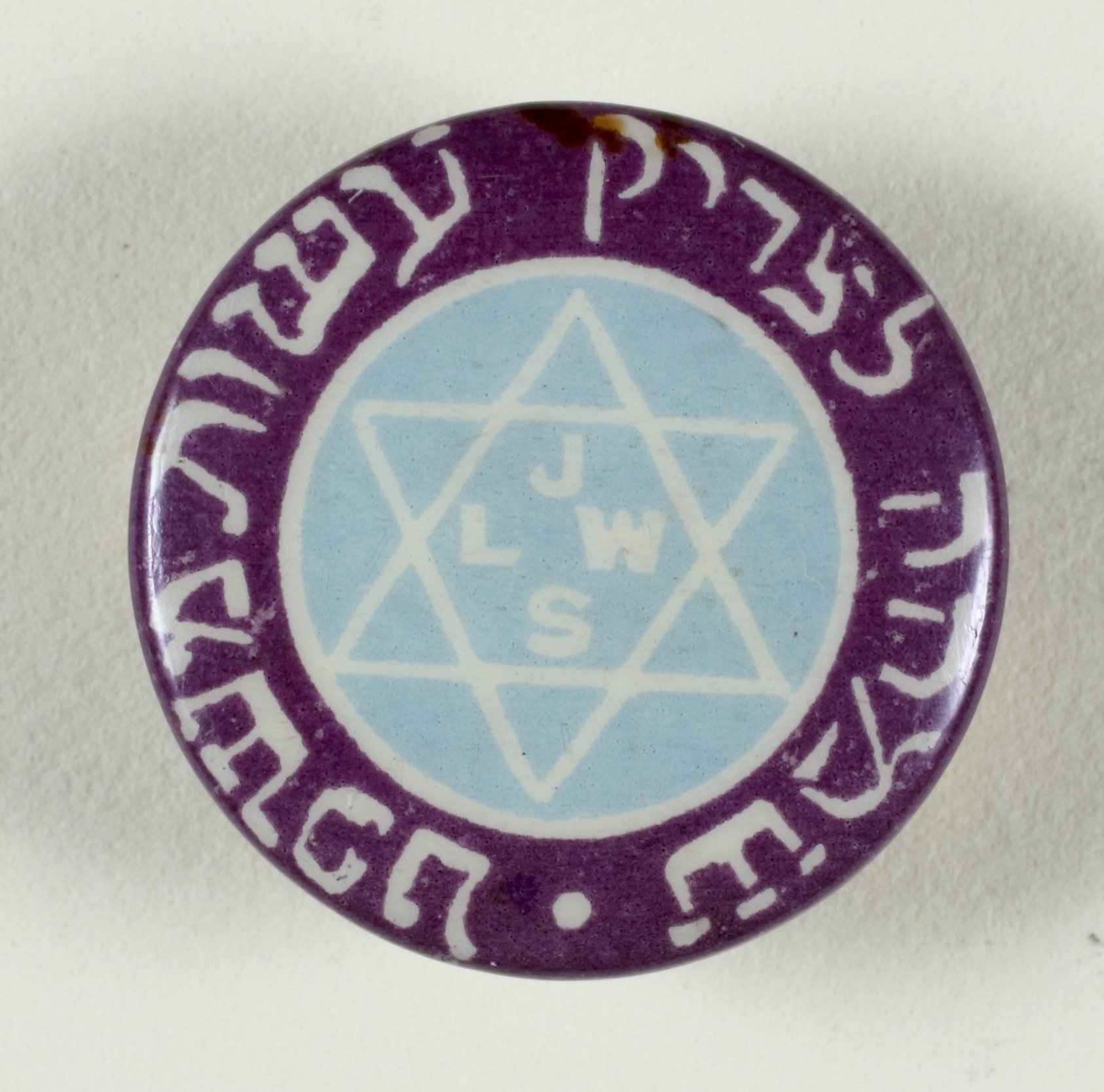
Jewish League for Woman Suffrage badge, from the collection of The Women's Library, London School of Economics and Political Science

In 1912 she helped form the Jewish League for Woman Suffrage which was open to both male and female members. The organization sought both political and religious rights for women. It was felt that some Jewish people may be more inclined to join this group in preference to an unspecific women's suffrage group. Other members included her husband, Henrietta Franklin, Hugh Franklin, Lily Montagu, Gertrude Golda Lowy, Inez Bensusan and Leonard Benjamin Franklin. Some more radical parts of the organization were responsible for disrupting synagogue services to make their point in 1913 and 1914. The group was labeled as "blackguards in bonnets" by the wider Jewish community.

== United Suffragists ==
The Jewish suffrage supporters came together on 6 February 1914 with other disillusioned suffragists to create the United Suffragists. The new group was created as a reaction to the extreme militancy of the WSPU which had started a campaign of arson and the lack of success of the National Union of Women's Suffrage Societies. The new group included her stepmother, her husband, Emmeline Pethick-Lawrence, Maud Arncliffe Sennett, Agnes Harben and her husband and Louisa Garrett Anderson. It welcomed former militants as well as non-militants and men as well as women. Once the Representation of the Peoples Act 1918 passed allowing (some) women to vote, the United Suffragists disbanded.

== Personal life and death ==
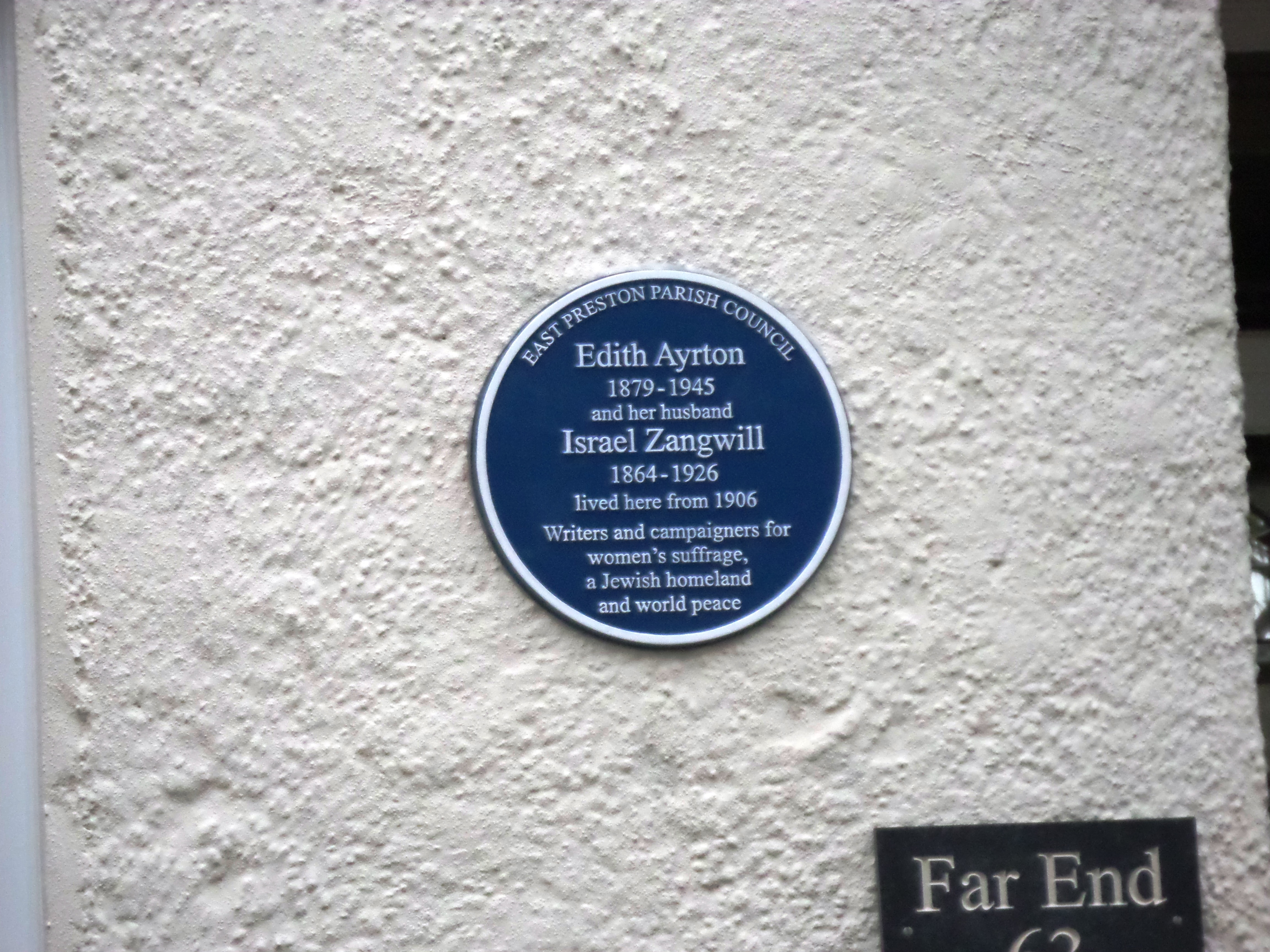
Blue plaque on Far End, East Preston, West Sussex

She married Israel Zangwill in a registry office on 26 November 1903. They had met as a result of her stepmother sending Edith's early stories to published writer Israel for his comments.

They had three children: George (born 1906), Margaret (born 1910) and Oliver Louis Zangwill (born 1913). Ayrton lived for many years in East Preston, West Sussex, in a house called Far End. She was widowed in 1926 and died in Edinburgh in 1945.

== Works ==
- Barbarous Babe (1904)
- The First Mrs Mollivar (1905)
- Teresa (1909)
- The Rise of a Star (1918)
- The Call (1924), which is similar to her stepmother's life
- The House (1928)
- The Story of the Disarmament Declaration (1932)
