= Arthur Ellis Franklin =

British merchant banker and senior partner of Keyser & Co (1857–1938)

- Born: 18 April 1857
- Died: 24 December 1938 (aged 81)
- Occupations: Merchant banker, senior partner of A. Keyser & Co
- Spouse: Caroline Jacob
- Children: Alice Caroline Franklin; Ellis Arthur Franklin; Cecil Arthur Franklin; Hugh Franklin; Helen Bentwich
- Parent: Ellis Abraham Franklin

Arthur Ellis Franklin (18 April 1857 – 24 December 1938) was a British merchant banker, social worker and antiquarian, a senior partner of Keyser & Co. He was a prominent member of the Jewish community in Britain between the wars.

== Early life ==
He was the son of the merchant banker Ellis Abraham Franklin (1822–1909), and came from a well-known Anglo-Jewish family, originally Fraenkel, that arrived in England in the 18th century. He was educated at the City of London School, and on the Continent.

== Career ==
Franklin was senior partner of A. Keyser & Co, a merchant bank. He resigned in May 1930 after 55 years associated with the firm. He was also a director of publishing company Routledge & Co and Chairman of the Notting Hill Electric Light Company.

== Personal life ==
His wife of 52 years was Caroline Jacob (1863–1935), an educationalist and suffragist. They had six children: Jacob Franklin; Alice Franklin, honorary secretary of the Townswomen's Guild; Cecil Arthur Franklin, chairman of the publishers Routledge; Hugh Franklin, a campaigner for women's suffrage and later Labour politician; Helen Caroline Franklin (later Bentwich), CBE, a social worker and politician; and Ellis Arthur Franklin, also a merchant banker. The family lived at Pembridge Gardens, Kensington and also (from 1899) at Chartridge Lodge, Chesham in Buckinghamshire, where they provided hospitality to German refugees (including Arthur Willner) and to Jewish officers and soldiers from overseas.
