= Ellis Franklin =

Ellis Franklin may refer to:

- Ellis Arthur Franklin (1894–1964), English merchant banker
- Ellis Abraham Franklin (1822–1909), his father, British merchant banker
