= Henrietta Franklin =

British suffragist (1866–1964)

Henrietta Franklin CBE
- Franklin in 1920
- Born: Henrietta Montagu; 9 April 1866; London, England, United Kingdom of Great Britain and Ireland
- Died: 7 January 1964 (aged 97); London, England, United Kingdom
- Known for: Parents' National Educational Union

Henrietta "Netta" Franklin, CBE born Henrietta Montagu (9 April 1866 – 7 January 1964) was a British educationist and suffragist. She championed the Parents' National Educational Union and the ideas of Charlotte Mason.

== Life ==
Franklin was born in London in 1866 to Henrietta and Samuel Montagu, 1st Baron Swaythling. She was the eldest of eleven children. The family business was banking and philanthropy.

Via her husband Ernest Louis Franklin, she was related by marriage to Rosalind Franklin, co-discoverer of the structure of DNA.

In 1890 she met Charlotte Mason in what others consider to be the "inspiring experience" of Franklin's life. By 1892 she had opened the first school in London based on Mason's principles. In 1894 Franklin became the secretary of the renamed Parents' National Educational Union and Franklin undertook speaking tours to major cities in America, Europe and South Africa. She devoted her own money to the cause and wrote on its behalf. Franklin's biography cites the PNEU's continued existence to her.

Her sister Lily Montagu led a liberal Jewish movement in Britain and in February 1902 the first meeting of the Jewish Religious Union for the Advancement of Liberal Judaism was held at Franklin's house.

Franklin was one of the few Jewish women to raise their profile in the suffrage movement. In 1912 she helped her in-laws Laura and Leonard Franklin form the Jewish League for Woman Suffrage which was open to both male and female members. The organisation sought both political and religious rights for women. It was felt that some Jewish people may be more inclined to join this group in preference to an unspecific women's suffrage group. Other members included Edith Ayrton, Hugh Franklin, her sister Lily Montagu and Inez Bensusan. The organisation was generally moderate but it had radical members. Some were responsible for disrupting synagogue services to make their point in 1913 and 1914. They were labelled as "blackguards in bonnets" by the Jewish community. However Henrietta achieved wider acceptance and became President of the National Union of Women's Suffrage Societies in 1916.

In 1950 she was appointed a CBE. Franklin died in 1964 in London.

== Posthumous recognition ==
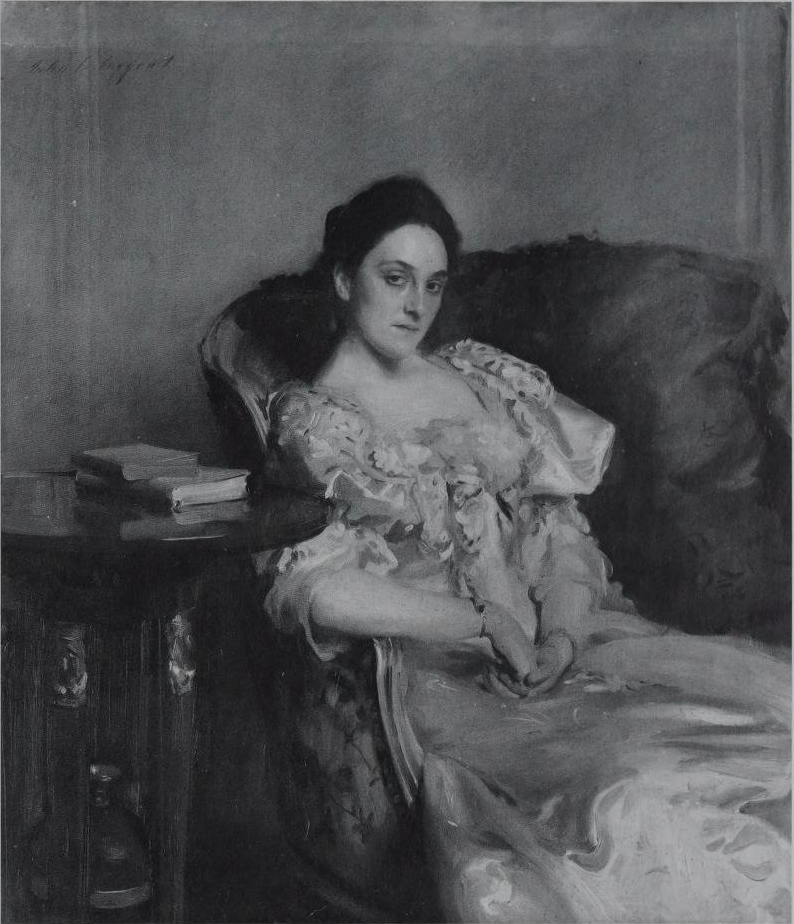
portrait by John Singer Sargent, c. 1898

Her name and picture (and those of 58 other women's suffrage supporters) are on the plinth of the statue of Millicent Fawcett in Parliament Square, London, unveiled in 2018.
