= Ellis Arthur Franklin =

English banker (1894–1964)

Ellis Franklin
- Born: Ellis Arthur Franklin; 28 March 1894; Kensington, London, England, UK
- Died: 16 January 1964 (aged 69); UK
- Occupations: Merchant banker, Keyser & Co
- Known for: Vice principal, The Working Men’s College
- Spouse: Muriel Frances Waley
- Children: 5 (including Colin Ellis Franklin, Sir Roland Franklin & Rosalind Franklin)
- Parent(s): Arthur Ellis Franklin; Caroline Jacob
- Relatives: Herbert Samuel, 1st Viscount Samuel (uncle); Sir Stuart Samuel, Bt. (uncle); Sir Leonard Franklin (uncle); Alice Franklin (sister); Cecil Franklin (brother); Helen Caroline Franklin (sister); Hugh Franklin (brother)

Ellis Arthur Franklin OBE (28 March 1894 – 16 January 1964) was an English merchant banker.

== Early life ==
Franklin was born in Kensington, London into an affluent Anglo-Jewish family. He was the son of Arthur Ellis Franklin, a merchant banker and senior partner at Keyser & Co, and his wife, Caroline Jacob.

The family was related to both parts of the Montagu-Samuel banking-and-politics 'Cousinhood'. Franklin's grandfather was Ellis Abraham Franklin (1822–1909), a partner at Samuel Montagu and brother-in-law of Lord Swaythling. His uncle was Herbert Samuel, Home Secretary (1916), and the first High Commissioner for the British Mandate of Palestine.

His siblings included Helen Bentwich (wife to Norman de Mattos Bentwich, Attorney General in the British Mandate of Palestine, active in trade union organisation, Women's Suffrage, and the London County Council on which she was a member) and Hugh Franklin, a militant suffragist and penal reform activist.

== Career ==
Ellis Franklin was a banker at Keyser & Co, where his father was senior partner. Franklin became a teacher of a class in Electricity at The Working Men's College in 1919, having been introduced to the College by his uncle, the banker Lionel Jacob. By 1922 he had become Vice Principal of the College and was instrumental in attracting donations to the College from the City, and new College Corporation members from the Home Office, The Bar, and the City.

== Personal life ==
Franklin married Muriel Frances Waley (1894–1976). They resided in London.

They had five children. David (1919–1986) was the eldest. Rosalind Franklin (1920 - 1958), was an influential biophysicist, being involved in the discovery of DNA among many areas of work. Colin Ellis Franklin (1923–2020) was a writer, bibliographer, book-collector and antiquarian bookseller. Sir Roland Franklin (1926-2024) was a merchant banker. Jenifer (born 1929) was their youngest child.

During World War II, Ellis A. Franklin helped Jewish refugees fleeing from the Continent, some being taken into the family home.
