= David John Chambers =

British bibliographer (1930–2025)

David John Chambers (19 April 1930 – 31 May 2025) was an English bibliographer, printing historian, printer and book collector. Throughout a career in insurance, latterly as a non-marine underwriter for AS Harrison Syndicate 56 at Lloyd's of London, and more recently in retirement, Chambers studied books and ephemera relating to printing, typography, book-illustration, private presses, the book-arts, English art and literature, and published books and articles on a wide range of related subjects. Between 1979 and 2020 he edited, or co-edited, The Private Library, the quarterly journal of the Private Libraries Association, a bibliophile society of which he was Chairman since the 1970s, and a Council member from the late 1950s.

Chambers also compiled volumes of the Association's annual bibliography of Private press books, and designed some of the publications of the Private Libraries Association and of the Bibliographical Society. His major work of recent years is a history and bibliography of British private presses before Kelmscott, being chiefly the privately run and amateur printing offices of the eighteenth and nineteenth centuries, which was published shortly before his death in the spring of 2025.

As a printer, Chambers began to run the Cuckoo Hill Press in the late 1950s, having made his first press himself. He printed a number of significant illustrated books in the 1960s, 1970s and 1980s, but after that period mostly confined his printing to ephemera and Christmas greetings. He collected printing equipment and archives from the 1950s, with a special interest in wood-engraved blocks.

Chambers died on 31 May 2025, at the age of 95.

== Select bibliography ==
- Chambers, David (editor). Charles Holtzapfel's Printing apparatus for the use of amateurs. Edited with James Mosley. Pinner: Private Libraries Association, 1971.
- Chambers, David (editor). Caractères de l'imprimerie, nouvellement gravés par S. P. Fournier le jeune. London: Printing Historical Society, 1975.
- Chambers, David. Cock-a-hoop: a sequel to Chanticleer, Pertelote and Cockalorum, being a bibliography of the Golden Cockerel Press, September 1949–December 1961. Written with Christopher Sandford. Pinner: Private Libraries Association, 1976.
- Chambers, David. Lucien Pissarro: notes on a selection of wood-blocks held at the Ashmolean Museum. Oxford: Ashmolean Museum, 1980.
- Chambers, David. The Boar's Head and Golden Hours Presses in The Private Library. Third series, 8:1, Spring 1985, pp. 2–34, published by the Private Libraries Association
- Chambers, David. Joan Hassall: engravings and drawings. Pinner: Private Libraries Association, 1985.
- Chambers, David. Gogmagog: Morris Cox & the Gogmagog Press. Written with Colin Franklin and Alan Tucker. Pinner: Private Libraries Association, 1991.
- Chambers, David (editor). A modest collection: Private Libraries Association 1956–2006. Pinner: Private Libraries Association, 2006.
- Chambers, David. English country book shops. Pinner: Private Libraries Association, 2009.
- Chambers, David. Early private presses 1730–1900. 2 volumes. Pinner: Private Libraries Association, 2025.

== Select Cuckoo Hill Press bibliography ==
- Chambers, David. The office press. 1961.
- Chambers, David. Elizabeth II numismata. 1964.
- Bewick, Thomas. Engravings on wood by Thomas Bewick and his pupils. 1971.
- Potocki de Montalk, Count Geoffrey. Meillerie. 1972.
- Chambers, David. On printing by hand. 1977.
- Shirley Smith, Richard. Wood engravings: a selection, 1960 to 1977 ... with a foreword by Laurence Whistler. 1983.
- Kalashnikov, Anatoli. Anglo-Russian relations: an essay in wood-engraving ... with a commentary by W. E. Butler. 1983.
