= Jewish League for Woman Suffrage =

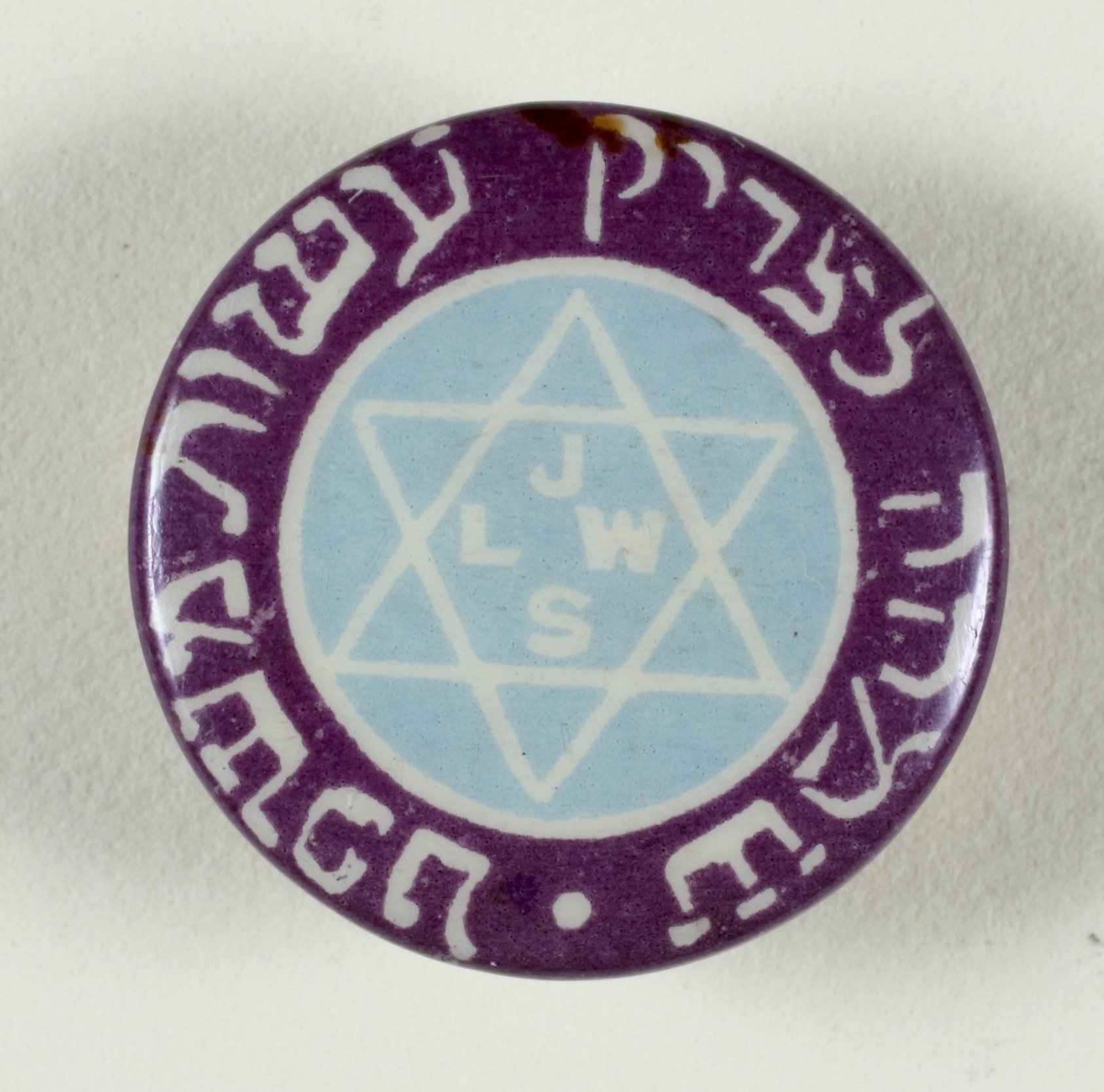
- Jewish League for Woman Suffrage badge, from the collection of Women's Library, London School of Economics and Political Science
- Formation: 3 November 1912
- Founder: Leonard Franklin, Lily Montagu

The Jewish League for Woman Suffrage was formed in 1912 in the United Kingdom. It was a Jewish league promoting women's suffrage. The group sought both and political and religious rights for women.

== History ==
When "votes for women" was a major political question in the United Kingdom there was resistance from conservative members of the Jewish community who worried that their involvement might prompt an anti-Semitic backlash. On 3 November 1912 Laura and Leonard Franklin formed the Jewish League for Woman Suffrage. It is thought that it was the only Jewish suffrage group in the world. It was open to members irrespective of their gender. The group's aim was to improve both political and religious rights for women. It was felt that some Jewish people may be more inclined to join this group in preference to an unspecific women's suffrage group. Other members included Edith Ayrton, Inez Bensusan, Nina Salaman, Hugh Franklin, Gertrude Golda Lowy, Alice Model, Romana Goodman, Lily Montagu and her sister Henrietta. Henrietta Franklin was one of the few Jewish women to raise their profile in the suffrage movement. Her sister Lily Montagu led a liberal Jewish movement in Britain and in 1902 they had arranged the first meeting of the Jewish Religious Union for the Advancement of Liberal Judaism at Henrietta Franklin's house. Lily and Henrietta were key members of the league's all female executive. Lily would lead the meetings in prayer and she would in time become a rabbi. Henrietta achieved wider acceptance and became President of the National Union of Women's Suffrage Societies in 1916.

The group was generally moderate but it had radical members. Some disrupted synagogue services to make their point in 1913 and 1914. The group was the major Jewish discussion point for two years. Women protesters were ejected from synagogues and they were labelled as "blackguards in bonnets" by the conservative Jewish community. The group's campaign caused some synagogues to give equal or partial rights to women inside their own group, but changes on a national basis took a lot longer to achieve.
