= Gertrude Horton =

British feminist and activist (1901–1978)

Gertrude Isabella Morton Horton
- Born: Gertrude Isabella Morton Robertson; 26 August 1901; Chelsea, England, United Kingdom of Great Britain and Ireland
- Died: 19 May 1978 (aged 76); Epsom, England, United Kingdom
- Education: North London Collegiate School; London University
- Occupation: organiser of national societies
- Known for: leading the Townswomen's Guild

Gertrude Isabella Morton Horton, born Gertrude Isabella Morton Robertson (26 August 1901 – 19 May 1978) was a British feminist who ran the Townswomen's Guild for over 25 years and then took a leading role in the Fawcett Society. She led a campaign for equal pay for women which led to parliamentary agreement for all public workers by 1955.

== Life ==
Horton was born in Chelsea. Her parents were the miniaturist Jane Faulkner (born Walters) and the painter Charles Kay Robertson. She was good at science and attended the North London Collegiate School before taking a degree at London University. She was active in the National Union of Students and she would have liked to have become a teacher but she had married a research chemist named Harold Vivian Horton and women teachers had to be single. It was expected that women would be supported by their husbands but Horton was determined to be independent.

She used her experience of the NUS to obtain job with the National Union of Societies for Equal Citizenship (NUSEC). In 1927 Eva Hubback left the organisation and Horton became NUSEC's parliamentary and organizing secretary. Here she would learn to lobby parliament.

In 1928 all women over the age of 21 were given the vote as a result of the Equal Franchise Act irrespective of their property, education or previous interests. The following year the idea of urban Guilds was launched by Margery Corbett Ashby, for women to meet and learn about citizenship and how to use the vote. The idea was to be based on the successful Women's Institutes, but the new guild was designed to appeal to urban women.

In 1932 the organisation had 146 guilds and it became the National Union of Townswomen's Guilds and Horton became its National Secretary. Alice Franklin became the honorary (i.e. unpaid) secretary in 1933. The two of them worked closely together. They both had suffrage backgrounds. Horton's mother had been active and Alice's brother was the first suffragette to be released under the Cat and Mouse Act. Horton would lobby member's of parliament. She and Franklin published a national handbook from the central offices in Cromwell Place in London in 1938. The handbook included rules, regulations and advice on finance and democracy and how to organise a meeting. By 1939 she was the national secretary to 544 guilds with 54,000 members.

In 1939 her father died and during the war the central guild organisation was reduced to just Franklin and Horton. They would shelter from bombing in the cellar of their offices during raids. One night in April 1941 while sheltering Horton lost four more members of her family to a bomb in Hampstead.

1948 saw reorganisation when Mary Courtney was elected as a new national secretary by a group who disapproved of Franklin and Horton's leadership style. Franklin resigned after a dispute over who would chair committees. Horton refused to resign in protest and she was forced out in 1949.

In 1951 she became the secretary for the Equal Pay Campaign Committee (EPCC). That year Hugh Gaitskell said that equal pay for women would drive up prices. Horton realised this “distressing statement” required a reaction and she wrote to Irene Ward, Barbara Castle and Liberal politician Jo Grimond asking that they raise this in parliament. Irene Ward raised the matter on 2 August pointing out that Gaitskell had "caused great resentment and bitterness" with his "unfair and inaccurate” claims. Labour MP Charles Pannell called on the government to make a definite decision on equal pay and Horton as EPCC called for a petition with a target of a million signatures.

A petition was organised for "equal pay for equal work" and it was combined with a rival petition to create a joint demand signed by over 80,000 people. The first page was signed by Irene Ward, Muriel Pierotti, Ethel Watts, Philippa Strachey and Horton.

By 1956 the Equal Pay Campaign Committee disbanded having achieved agreement to the introduction, in stages, of equal pay in the public sector. Full Equal Pay by law did not happen until it was introduced Barbara Castle the Equal Pay Act in 1970.

Brian Harrison recorded three oral history interviews with Horton, in February, March and April 1975, as part of the Suffrage Interviews project, titled Oral evidence on the suffragette and suffragist movements: the Brian Harrison interviews. Horton talks about the operations of the NUSEC and NUTG, and about a number of prominent figures in the women's movement, including Alice Franklin, Pippa Strachey and Ethel Watts.
