= Charterhouse Bank =

British investment bank

- Type: Public
- Industry: Banking
- Founded: 1920
- Defunct: 2000
- Fate: Acquired
- Successor: HSBC
- Headquarters: London, UK
- Key people: Sir Victor Blank, (Chairman and CEO)

Charterhouse Bank was a British investment bank formed in 1920. The business would later become part of HSBC.

== History ==
Charterhouse Bank was incorporated as an investment bank in December 1920. In 1925, Charterhouse Investment Trust was created, with its first sponsored issue being that of International Pulp and Chemical Company in 1926. Charterhouse Investment Trust also started buying department stores in London, floating United Drapery Stores as the holding company for its retail investments in 1927. In 1963 Charterhouse Bank merged with S. Japhet and Company, a rival investment bank established by Saemy Japhet (1858–1954), to form Charterhouse Japhet.

A US-based arm, Charterhouse Group, was formed in 1973, but became independent of its parent in the 1980s. In 1981 Charterhouse Japhet acquired Keyser Ullman, a substantial but failing rival. In November 1983, Jacob Rothschild merged his own investment business, RIT & Northern, into Charterhouse Japhet and took a controlling stake in the combined business which was briefly known as Charterhouse J. Rothschild. Rothschild then sold the banking business, still known as Charterhouse Japhet, to the Royal Bank of Scotland in January 1985. From 1985 to 1996 Sir Victor Blank held the posts of chairman and chief executive of the banking business, which reverted to its original name, Charterhouse Bank.

Royal Bank of Scotland sold 90% of Charterhouse Bank (retaining 10%) to two continental banks, Crédit Commercial de France and Berliner Handels- und Frankfurter Bank in February 1993. Crédit Commercial de France acquired Berliner Handels- und Frankfurter Bank in the late 1990s, so consolidating its investment in Charterhouse Bank, but was itself taken over by HSBC in 2000.

In June 2001, the management of Charterhouse Capital Partners, the private equity unit of Charterhouse Bank, completed a management buyout from HSBC to become an independent private equity business. Similarly, in May 2011, the management of HSBC Specialist Investments (later InfraRed Capital Partners) completed a management buyout from HSBC to become an independent infrastructure investment business.
