= Emily Marion Harris =

Novelist, poet, and educationist

- Born: 7 June 1844; London, United Kingdom
- Died: 5 December 1900 (aged 56); London, United Kingdom
- Resting place: Willesden Jewish Cemetery, London Borough of Brent
- Occupations: Novelist; poet; social worker
- Writing career
- Pen name: E. M. H., Estelle
- Language: English
- Genres: Jewish literature; children's literature; poetry
- Notable works: Estelle (1878); Benedictus (1887)

Signature
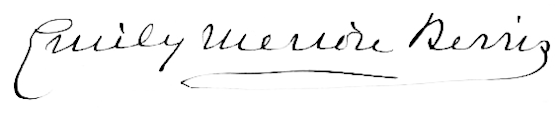

Emily Marion Harris (7 June 1844 – 5 December 1900) was an English novelist, poet, and social worker. Many of her writings explored Jewish life in London, and the religious and political conflicts of Jewish traditionalists in the face of increasing assimilation.

== Biography ==
Emily Marion Harris was born in London to Jewish parents Sarah (née Barnett) and Aaron Lascelles Harris. Sarah, a teacher, was active in charitable organisations for the Jewish poor of East London. Harris' maternal grandmother, Leah Barnett, was governess of the girls' section of the Jews' Free School, while her paternal aunt, Miriam Harris, was headmistress of the School's preparatory nursery.

From 1887, Harris led the West Central Jewish Girls' Club in Soho, co-founded with Lily Montagu under the patronage of Lady Charlotte de Rothschild and Constance Rothschild, Lady Battersea. The Club aimed to provide evening continuation classes, recreation, and social interaction opportunities for working women living in the West Central district. It had developed from a Sabbath school for poor Jewish girls that Harris, her sisters, and her mother held at their family home.

Harris maintained a friendship and correspondence with Robert Browning, to whom she had been introduced by Eliza FitzGerald in 1883. He was known to consult her on Hebraic and Jewish matters.

She died in 1900 at her home at Tavistock Square, Bloomsbury, after an attack of pneumonia lasting a few days. Her funeral service was conducted by hazzan Marcus Hast of the Orthodox Great Synagogue, with a eulogy by Reform rabbi Morris Joseph. The Emily Harris Home for Jewish Working Girls, which provided meals and lodging for working class Jewish women, was named in her memory.

== Work ==
Harris' best-known novels, Estelle (1878)—initially published anonymously—and its sequel Benedictus (1887), advocated for orthodoxy in the face of increasing assimilation. In Estelle, the titular protagonist is an aspiring Jewish artist who, amid struggles with religious orthodoxy and female autonomy, chooses a life of spinsterhood instead of taking a Christian lover. The novel was rated "highly" by the Athenaeum, and praised as "a thoroughly picturesque story of Jewish life" and "recommended as pleasant reading for persons of any creed" by the Court Journal.

She published The Narrative of the Holy Bible, a book of Bible stories originally written for the children of Leopold de Rothschild, in 1889. Her final publication was the children's book Rosalind (1895), a story of a girl who, after an illness, spends some time convalescing in Hampton Court Palace, and meets in one of the houses with three parrots, who tell her the tale of their lives.

A sermon on "Woman—Then and Now" given by Harris at the Bayswater Synagogue in 1899 was published by Hermann Gollancz in 1909, and an obituary poem written on the death of the Baroness de Rothschild was published in The Standard Book of Jewish Verse in 1917.

== Publications ==
- Amy and Rosalie: A Mother's Memorials of Two Beloved Children. London. 1854. Revised as Two Little Sisters in 1863.
- Four Messengers. London: Bell and Daldy. 1870.
- Echoes. London: Bell and Daldy. 1872.
- Twilight and Dawn. London: Bell and Daldy. 1873.
- Clemène: A Sketch. London: George Bell and Sons. 1874.
- Mercer's Gardens. London: George Bell and Sons. 1876.
- Estelle. London: George Bell and Sons. 1878. Volume I–Volume II.
- Friends Only. London: Marcus Ward & Co. 1879.
- Within a Circle. London: Marcus Ward & Co. 1880.
- Verses. London: George Bell and Sons. 1881.
- The Lieutenant: A Story of the Tower. London: George Bell and Sons. 1882.
- Benedictus. London: George Bell and Sons. 1887. Volume I–Volume II.
- The Narrative of the Holy Bible. London: Trübner & Co. 1889.
- Lady Dobbs: A Novel. London: Kegan Paul. 1890.
- Apples of Eden: A Realism. London: George Routledge and Sons. 1890.
- Rosalind: The Story of Three Parrots. London: George Redway. 1895.
