= Cecil Franklin =

- Born: Cecil Arthur Franklin; 9 March 1887
- Died: 28 January 1961 (aged 73)
- Occupations: chairman, Routledge
- Parent(s): Arthur Ellis Franklin; Caroline Jacob
- Relatives: Herbert Samuel, 1st Viscount Samuel (uncle); Alice Franklin (sister); Ellis Arthur Franklin (brother); Helen Caroline Franklin (sister); Hugh Franklin (brother); Rosalind Franklin (niece)

Cecil Arthur Franklin (9 March 1887 – 28 January 1961), was chairman of the publishers Routledge from 1948 until his death in 1961.

The son of the merchant banker Arthur Ellis Franklin and his wife, Caroline (née Jacob), Cecil Franklin was educated at the Jewish boarding school in Brighton run by Maurice Jacobs, joined the publishers Routledge in 1906, became a director in 1912, and was chairman from 1948 until his death in 1961.
