= Roland Franklin =

Antigua and Barbuda-based merchant banker (1926–2024)

Sir Roland Franklin
- Born: Roland Arthur Ellis Franklin; 5 May 1926; London, England
- Died: 1 February 2024 (aged 97); Antigua
- Occupation: Merchant banker
- Spouse: Lady Nina Franklin
- Children: 6, including Martin E. Franklin
- Parent(s): Ellis Arthur Franklin; Muriel Frances Waley
- Relatives: Rosalind Franklin (sister); Colin Ellis Franklin (brother)

Sir Roland Arthur Ellis Franklin (5 May 1926 – 1 February 2024) was a British-born Antigua and Barbuda-based merchant banker.

== Early life ==
Roland Franklin was born in 1926 into an affluent and influential British Jewish family. His father, Ellis Arthur Franklin (1894–1964), was a merchant banker. His sister was Rosalind Franklin, the scientist whose research led to discovery of the structure of DNA. His brother was writer, bibliographer, and antiquarian Colin Ellis Franklin.

== Career ==
Franklin was a merchant banker, and a director of Keyser Ullman, the British merchant bank that failed in the 1973-74 banking crisis.

Franklin had a long business partnership with the corporate raider James Goldsmith. As Goldsmith began winding down his US operations in 1987, Roland Franklin set up the Pembridge group together with his son Martin E. Franklin. Together they undertook a series of transactions between 1987 and 1989, the largest of which was the $1.3 billion hostile takeover of the Dickinson Robinson Group (DRG). Franklin appointed his son as the chief executive officer of DRG, with the goal of breaking up the conglomerate via a series of asset sales.

Franklin retired from active business in 1991, leaving Martin Franklin and Ian Ashken to oversee the final DRG asset sales. In 1992 they returned to the US with the intention of using their experience at DRG to build, rather than break up companies.

== Defence of Israel ==
In June 2015, Franklin published an opinion piece in j., a Northern California Jewish newspaper, arguing that the Joint Comprehensive Plan of Action, also known as the Iran nuclear deal, would be "the first step on the path to World War III." He went on to compare U.S. President Barack Obama to British Prime Minister Neville Chamberlain prior to World War II, suggesting, "Obama is betraying Israel.". He concluded that Iran "should be treated as an extremely dangerous pariah."

== Personal life and death ==
Franklin was married to Lady Nina Franklin. They resided in Jumby Bay, a private island off the coast of Antigua. Their son Martin E. Franklin is the co-founder and chairman of Jarden.

Franklin died on 1 February 2024, at the age of 97.
