= Arthur Willner =

Czech composer and teacher (1881–1959)

Arthur Willner (5 March 1881 – 6 April 1959) was a Bohemian-German composer, pianist, and teacher who from 1938 lived and worked in the UK.

== Education and European career ==
Willner was born in Turn (Trnovany (Teplice)) in Teplitz-Schönau, Bohemia, Austrian Empire. He attended the Leipzig Conservatory where he studied with Adolf Ruthardt (piano), Carl Reinecke (composition) and Carl Piutti (music theory). He then continued his studies at the Akademie der Tonkunst in Munich with Joseph Rheinberger (piano) and Ludwig Thuille (composition).

In 1902 he secured his first significant academic post, as composition teacher and (from 1904) deputy director of the Stern Conservatory, Berlin. The position was secured after Gustav Hollaender heard his first string quartet. Fellow teachers there included Englebert Humperdink, Arnold Schoenberg and Ferrucio Busoni. Students he taught and influenced included Claudio Arrau, Otto Klemperer, Frederick Loewe, Edgar Varese, Kurt Weill and Stefan Wolpe.

He stayed there until 1924, when he was invited by former students to start a music conservatory in Istanbul. However, the extreme change of politics and government instability forced him to leave after only eight months. He then moved to Vienna, where he taught at the Volkshochschule and Neues Wiener Konservatorium, working alongside Simon Pullman, Egon Wellesz and Paul Wittgenstein, and where pupils included Hanns Eisler and Erwin Weiss. He also edited music for Universal Edition. During this period he and his wife Cecile Taufstein (°Paris, 31 January 1882) were living in the 7th district of Vienna, in the Zieglergasse.

== Exile in England ==
On 15 March 1938 at the age of 57, Willner left Austria for Paris to escape the Anschluss; he moved to England later that year. After arriving in England, Willner received an invitation through the Jewish Centre, Woburn House from Arthur Franklin, director of Routledge & Co, to stay at Chartridge House, Chesham in Buckinghamshire. Willner stayed for two months, during which time he composed his English Concerto for chamber orchestra (Op. 98). This work is one of only three English-themed works in his entire known output (the others being the Hereford Suite (Op. 102) and a handful of English songs). In September 1939 he moved to Kington in Herefordshire, into the gardener's cottage at Gravel Hill, the parental home of composer E.J. Moeran, where he composed, taught, edited music for Boosey & Hawkes and helped Moeran with music copying and some orchestrations.

Willner remained at Gravel Hill until 1945, when Cecile became fatally ill and, after a short period in Edgbaston Hospital in Birmingham, she was moved to a nursing home in London. Cecile died later that year. Willner moved to London, where he lived at 68 Shoot-Up Hill, Cricklewood. In 1948 he developed a heart condition, which left him bed-bound, although he continued to compose until his own death in 1959.

== Composition ==
Despite his relatively prominent place in the German musical establishment during the first part of the century, most of his works are now completely unknown and many believed lost. Willner composed over well over 100 works, around half of them during his 20 years in England. His most successful period as a composer was between 1907 and 1925 when his opus list includes string quartets, piano and violin sonatas, chamber works, a symphony, violin and cello concertos and numerous vocal and choral works. However, once in the UK, and despite efforts by Moeran to promote his music, it remained largely unperformed during the rest of his lifetime. Exceptions included a Manchester performance of his Concerto for String Orchestra in 1938, a recital of his own piano music at Leighton House in May 1939, a concert by the City of Birmingham Orchestra including his Piano Concerto in A minor, and a 1946 performance in Sheffield of his Clarinet Sonata, performed by John Bird.

Willner's music combines romantic lyricism with contrapuntal rigour and formal clarity. There were six symphonies, a Violin Concerto Op. 67, a Cello Concerto, two piano concertos and the Concerto for String Orchestra, Op. 37); chamber music (much of it with piano, but also five string quartets); choral music and song. Universal Edition published a few of his works in Austria and Novello and Hinrichsin (now Peters) published three of his works in London. His "highly chromatic and intense" Sonata for Solo Flute, Op. 34, is currently the only piece of his still in print and recorded. Otherwise he is best remembered for arrangements, such as his string orchestra transcription of Béla Bartók's Romanian Folk Dances for piano, and for his orchestral reduction of Richard Strauss's Oboe Concerto.

His archives, including extensive diaries, journals and letters, are held at the Leo Baeck Institute in New York and the Gesellschaft der Musikfreunde in Vienna.
