= Surplus women =

Phrase

Surplus women is a phrase coined during the Industrial Revolution referring to a perceived excess of unmarried women in Britain.

== Background ==
UK population in millions
Year	Females	Males	Difference
1901	19.75	18.49	1.26
1911	21.73	20.39	1.35
1921	19.80	18.08	1.72
1931	23.98	22.06	1.92

The 19th century saw improvements to agricultural productivity that stimulated population growth while reducing the demand for farm labour. This led to a worker surplus that was mainly absorbed by either domestic industry or New World agriculture. The surplus was roughly equal between the sexes, however disproportionate opportunities existed for men over women in employment domestically and abroad, and in armed service. By 1850 more than a quarter of the female population of the UK between 20 and 45 was unmarried, and finding increasing difficulty in accessing economic means.

The 1851 United Kingdom census put numbers to this disparity – between five hundred thousand and one million more women than men. The figures caused moral and social panic, with the widespread belief that there would be large numbers of unmarried women living lives of misery and poverty. Between 1850 and 1900 opportunities for women were expanding beyond simple domestic employment – at one point representing almost 40% of the British workforce. By the outbreak of the First World War this figure had declined to 32%, in large part due to the decline of the domestic sector. However, these jobs tended toward low wages and poor advancement opportunities, generally factory work; one of the largest female sectors was the textile trade.

The outbreak of war severely impacted these sectors; for example the collapse of cotton exports. At one point female unemployment was around 44%.

== World War I ==
Even before the war, six out of seven children in Britain were compelled by financial necessity to leave school at the age of 14 to go into the workforce to earn a wage. In 1901, over half of all women workers were under 25 years of age. By 1911, 77 % of women workers were single, 14 % were married and 9 % were either divorced or widowed. Regardless of their marital status, women were able to find job opportunities, especially during the First World War due to absence of men in the workforce. Halfway through the war, by 1916, the female labour force had grown by 600,000.

World War I compounded the gender imbalance. The deaths of nearly one million men during the war increased the gender gap by over a million; from 670,000 to 1,700,000. The number of unmarried women seeking economic means grew dramatically. In addition, demobilisation and economic decline following the war caused high unemployment. The war increased female employment; however, the return of demobilised men displaced many from the workforce, as did the closure of many of the wartime factories. Hence women who had worked during the war found themselves struggling to find jobs and those approaching working age were not offered the opportunity.

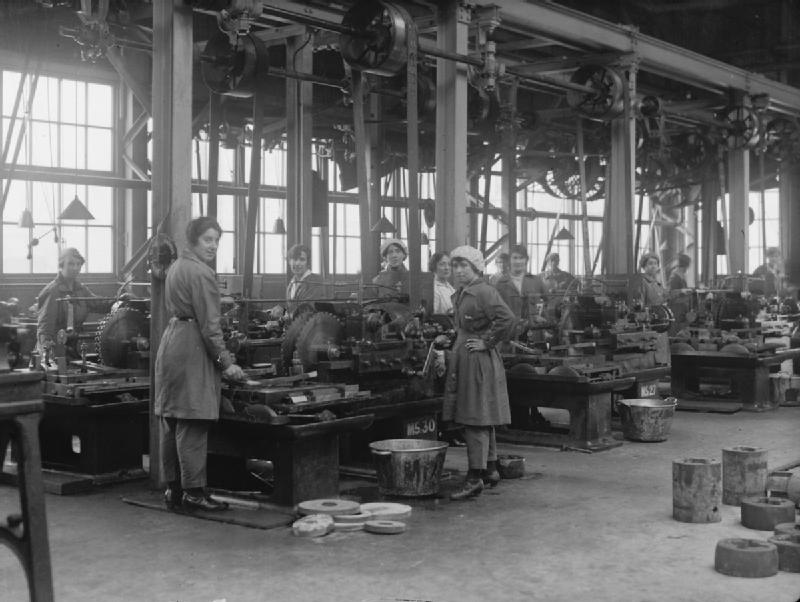
Women workers in the Royal Gun Factory (Royal Arsenal, Woolwich, London, 1918.)

Many women during World War I sought employment opportunities at factories. Women's health became a concern, as they were being exposed to working conditions that they were not used to. There were fears that the factory work undertaken by female workers could exert a damaging influence on their health, mind and morals. Specifically, women's reproductive health was a concern. Britain was looking out for their future generation of workers; Britain needed a healthy labour force to maintain their country. The debate about female workers’ health soon went beyond an earlier concern with just their reproductive organs and functions. There were new health codes implemented embracing the health of girls and young women who were in the workforce. There were efforts to implement a national occupational health service. This service was negotiated between the government, unions, employers, and medical professionals. This health movement was aimed at keeping Britain safe pre and post war.

Also a concern, was women becoming too involved in their work life and distancing themselves from their domestic life. Socially, women were still expected to keep a clean house and run a smooth household. Some men were against women having a work life outside of their children. These men believed that it was in the children's best interest to have a full-time mother around parenting the children. Their reasoning behind their firm belief was simply that the future generation of workers were more important. At this point in history women were not seen as equals to men in the workforce and experienced prejudice towards their employment status. Many women were also still unmarried due to the larger number of women compared to men in Britain at this time.

== World War II ==
World War II led to more job opportunities for women. Some women used their geographical skills and training to create accurate maps during wartime. These women were embraced in the workforce for having such talents. After the Second World War there was a closure of wartime nurseries (Morelli 68). This became an obstacle for working mothers or mothers who wanted to work. The closure of these nurseries expressed the government's support of women staying at home and leading a domestic life. This government decision had little effect on working mothers because they used other means of childcare. Children would be left with family during the day or at the neighbor's house. Women still experienced low wages and high unemployment. This was due to the ongoing labour shortage in the 1950s. Their employers in the workforce were also continually discriminating against women. Women in the workforce were sometimes viewed as neglecting their motherly duties. Societal pressure was on for women to conform to certain norms when it came to being the proper mother or wife, this could be interpreted as women choosing not to pursue a working career. After the Second World War more women were married with children compared to the First World War, decades earlier.

== Government response ==
The British government viewed emigration as a solution to several social issues caused by the war and preceding century. An emigration bill in 1918 established the Government Emigration Committee, which was quickly renamed the Overseas Settlement Committee. The act aimed to organise pre-existing emigration societies – volunteer organisations, often operated by society women, set up to assist with emigration to the colonies.

In 1919 the committee hosted a conference on women's emigration, which led to the creation of the Society for the Oversea Settlement of British Women. Essentially the women's department of the Overseas Settlement Committee, it received an annual budget of £5,000.

The SOSBW had panels devoted regions (Africa, Canada, Australia, New Zealand) and career sectors (such as nursing, training and agriculture).

== Postwar developments ==
Further obstruction to economic means came about by the presence of a marriage bar in many occupations. Also, due to the extended life expectancy of women, the loss of pension income attached to deceased males also contributed to the surplus women issue. Florence White was instrumental in campaigning for pensions for women in order to alleviate this issue.
