= Private Libraries Association =

International society of book collectors

The Private Libraries Association (PLA) is an international society of book collectors with 450 individual members and over 100 institutional members. The majority of members are based in Britain, but there are also members in the United States, Canada, Australia and Europe.

== Origin ==
The PLA came into being in 1956 when 18-year-old Philip Ward wrote a letter to the Observer inviting booklovers and book collectors to attend a meeting to discuss the setting up of an association whose aims would be

- to help readers in the organisation, cataloguing and fuller enjoyment of their personal collections;
- to cover every subject field by voluntary organised specialisation, and to record locations for loans.

== Print publications ==
Since 1957 the PLA has published a quarterly journal, originally called P.L.A. Quarterly but quickly renamed to The Private Library in 1958. Since Spring 1968, the journal has appeared in a standard format of some 40-50 pages containing two or three illustrated articles. The PLA also publishes a members' book every year or two years. The articles and books are written by members and cover a wide range of subjects – classic fine printing and modern private presses, modern small presses and children's books, illustrators and publishers, famous books and the history of printing, bookplates and bookbinding, bookselling, etc.. Details of the books and the Private Library can be found on the association's website.

== Governance ==
The current Chairman of the Association is James Freemantle.
