= Colin Franklin (bibliographer) =

English writer and bibliographer (1923–2020)

Colin Ellis Franklin, FSA (8 October 1923 – 17 May 2020) was an English writer, bibliographer, book-collector and antiquarian bookseller.

== Early life ==
Franklin was born in Notting Hill, London, into an affluent and influential British Jewish family. He was the son of Muriel Frances Waley (1894–1976) and Ellis Arthur Franklin (1894–1964), a London merchant banker. His sister was the posthumously renowned biophysicist Rosalind Franklin. The uncle of Franklin's father was The 1st Viscount Samuel, who was home secretary in 1916 and the first practising Jew to serve in a British Cabinet; he was also the first high commissioner (the governor of a territory that is not a colony) for the British Mandate of Palestine. Franklin's aunt, Helen Caroline Franklin, married Norman Bentwich, later the attorney-general of the British Mandate of Palestine; she was active in trade union organisation and women's suffrage, then a member of the London County Council and was appointed a CBE in 1965.

== Career ==
As a pupil at Oundle School, Colin developed an interest in William Morris and the Pre-Raphaelites. After Oundle, he studied at St John's College, Oxford, and worked for some years in publishing (at Routledge in London) before moving into antiquarian bookselling. He specialised in the study of private presses and the book-arts, but also wrote on Shakespeare, Japanese books and prints, Lord Chesterfield, Elizabeth Barrett Browning and on printing techniques and media.

He was honorary president of the Oxford University Society of Bibliophiles, patron to the Oundle School Society of Bibliophiles, president of the Private Libraries Association and the Double Crown Club.

On 19 April 2019, he was appointed to the rank of Chevalier in the Ordre national de la Légion d'honneur by the president of France in recognition of his service on HMS Kimberley in August 1944, when he was a junior officer taking part in Operation Dragoon, the Allied invasion of Southern France.

== Select bibliography ==
- Franklin, Colin. Out of Order [poems 1956–2012]. Culham: Privately printed, 2015.
- Franklin, Colin. Letters to a Granddaughter on Books and Book Collecting. Moreton-in-Marsh: Strawberry Press for the author, 2012 [i.e. 2013]. Illustrated by Phillida Gili.
- Franklin, Colin. Obsessions and Confessions of a Book Life. New Castle: Oak Knoll; Victoria: Book of Kells; London: Quaritch, 2012.
- Franklin, Colin. Exploring Japanese Books and Scrolls. San Francisco: Book Club of California, 1999; London: British Library, 2005.
- Franklin, Colin. Bookselling - A Memoir from 1980 by Colin Franklin. Carrollton, Ohio: Press on Scroll Road, 1999.
- Franklin, Colin. Book Collecting as One of the Fine Arts. Aldershot: Scolar, 1995.
- Franklin, Colin. Lord Chesterfield: His Character and Characters. Aldershot: Scolar, 1993.
- Franklin, Colin. The Gehenna Press: The Work of Fifty Years, 1942–1992: The Catalogue of an Exhibition Curated by Lisa Unger Baskin. With a bibliography by Hosea Baskin and notes by Leonard Baskin. [Dallas]: Bridwell Library and Gehenna Press, 1992.
- Franklin, Colin. Gogmagog: Maurice Cox and the Gogmagog Press. With David Chambers and Alan Tucker. Pinner: Private Libraries Association, 1991.
- Franklin, Colin. The Private Presses. Second edition, Aldershot: Scolar, 1991. (Originally published London: Studio Vista, 1969).
- Franklin, Colin. Shakespeare Domesticated: The Eighteenth-century Editions. Aldershot: Scolar, 1991.
- Franklin, Colin. Elizabeth Barrett Browning at the Mercy of her Publishers. [Waco]: Armstrong Browning Library, 1989.
- Franklin, Colin. Poets of the Daniel Press. Cambridge: Rampant Lions Press, 1988.
- Franklin, Colin. The Ashendene Press. Dallas: Bridwell Library, 1986.
- Franklin, Colin. Printing and the Mind of Morris. Cambridge: Rampant Lions Press, 1986.
- Franklin, Colin (editor). Gordon Craig's Paris Diary, 1872–1966. North Hills: Bird and Bull Press, 1982.
- Franklin, Colin. Fond of Printing: Gordon Craig as Typographer and Illustrator. San Francisco: Book Club of California, 1980.
- Franklin, Colin. Themes in Aquatint. San Francisco: Book Club of California, 1978.
- Franklin, Colin. Emery Walker: Some Light on his Theories of Printing and on his Relations with William Morris and Cobden-Sanderson. Cambridge: University Printing House, 1973.
