= Townswomen's Guild =

British women's organization

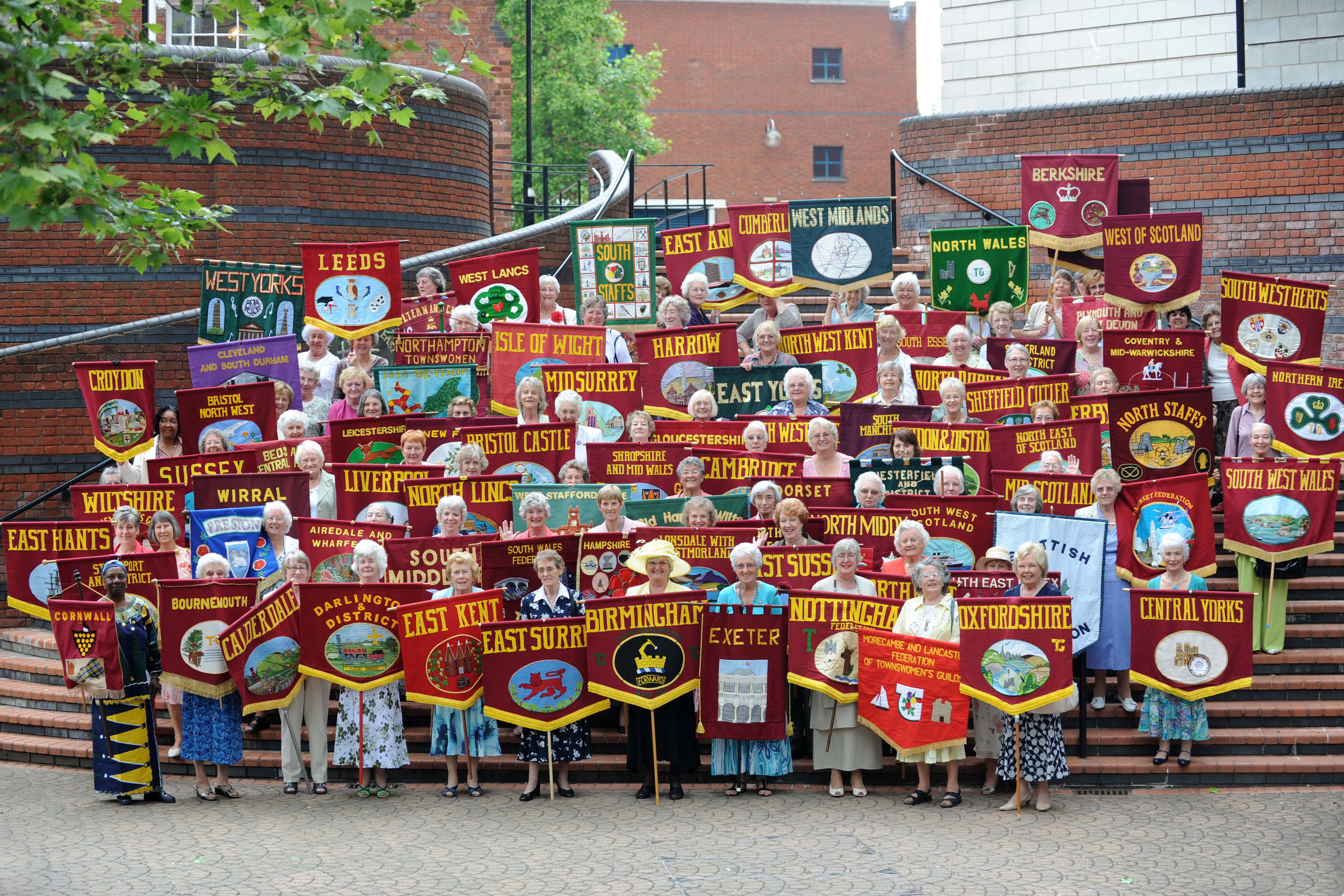
Members representing their Federation at the 2009 AGM in Birmingham

The Townswomen's Guild (TG) is a British women's organisation. There are approximately 30,000 members, 706 branches and 77 Federations throughout England, Scotland, Wales and Northern Ireland, the Isle of Man and the Isle of Wight. (Figures updated 1 August 2013).

The Townswomen's Guild is the second largest British women's organisation. It consists of local branches, known as guilds, and federations, which are groups of local guilds who work together throughout the UK.

The movement was formed in 1929, at the instigation of Margery Corbett Ashby and Eva Hubback, when all women over 21 won the right to vote and with the aim of educating women about good citizenship.

== Membership and organisational Structure ==
The national headquarters of the Townswomen's Guilds (TG), is in Birmingham, England.

== Hierarchy ==
The Townswomen's Guilds' (TG) Patron is Her Royal Highness The Princess Royal, and the organisation's National President is Dame Diana Brittan DBE. Its National Vice-Presidents are Dame Jocelyn Barrow DBE, Eileen Bell CBE and Baroness Flather.

The Guilds' Honorary Life National Vice-Presidents are Maggie Chilton MBE, Jean Ellerton JP, Marjory Hall OBE, Jean Hunt, Pamela Pollock, Pauline Myers, Sue Smith OBE, Iris Shanahan MBE, Pauline Myers and Margaret Key.

The current National Chairman is Penny Ryan, who leads the board of the National Executive Committee (NEC) in the running the organisation and the staff at the headquarters.

== Awards ==
Every year, members are recognised and awards are presented at the organisation’s Annual General Meeting (AGM). "Townswoman of the Year" is an award presented to a member who has devoted their time and energy to the organisation and is chosen by the National Chairman. The "Officers’ Trophy" is given to a member who has exceptionally gone ‘above and beyond the call of duty’ to support an organisation or charity and is chosen by the National Executive Committee (NEC).

== Townswoman ==
The Townswomen’s Guilds (TG) produces Townswoman, a magazine for its members which is published quarterly every year - it is delivered directly to all TG members. Townswoman contains a mixture of articles covering all aspects of the organisation and more general features of interest to the members.

== Activities ==
Guilds meet mainly monthly, and their programmes include speakers, demonstrations, social activities and outings. Townswomen also get involved in charitable events, International Women's Day, sports, creative leisure activities, competitions and exhibitions. The Guild tries to influence change, with a focus on public affairs, using the opinions of its members on important issues for the attention of decision-makers.

== History ==
In 1897, the National Union of Women's Suffrage Societies was formed and it was led by suffragist Millicent Fawcett and in 1918 some women in Britain got the vote. At this point the National Union of Societies for Equal Citizenship became the new name of the suffragist organisation.

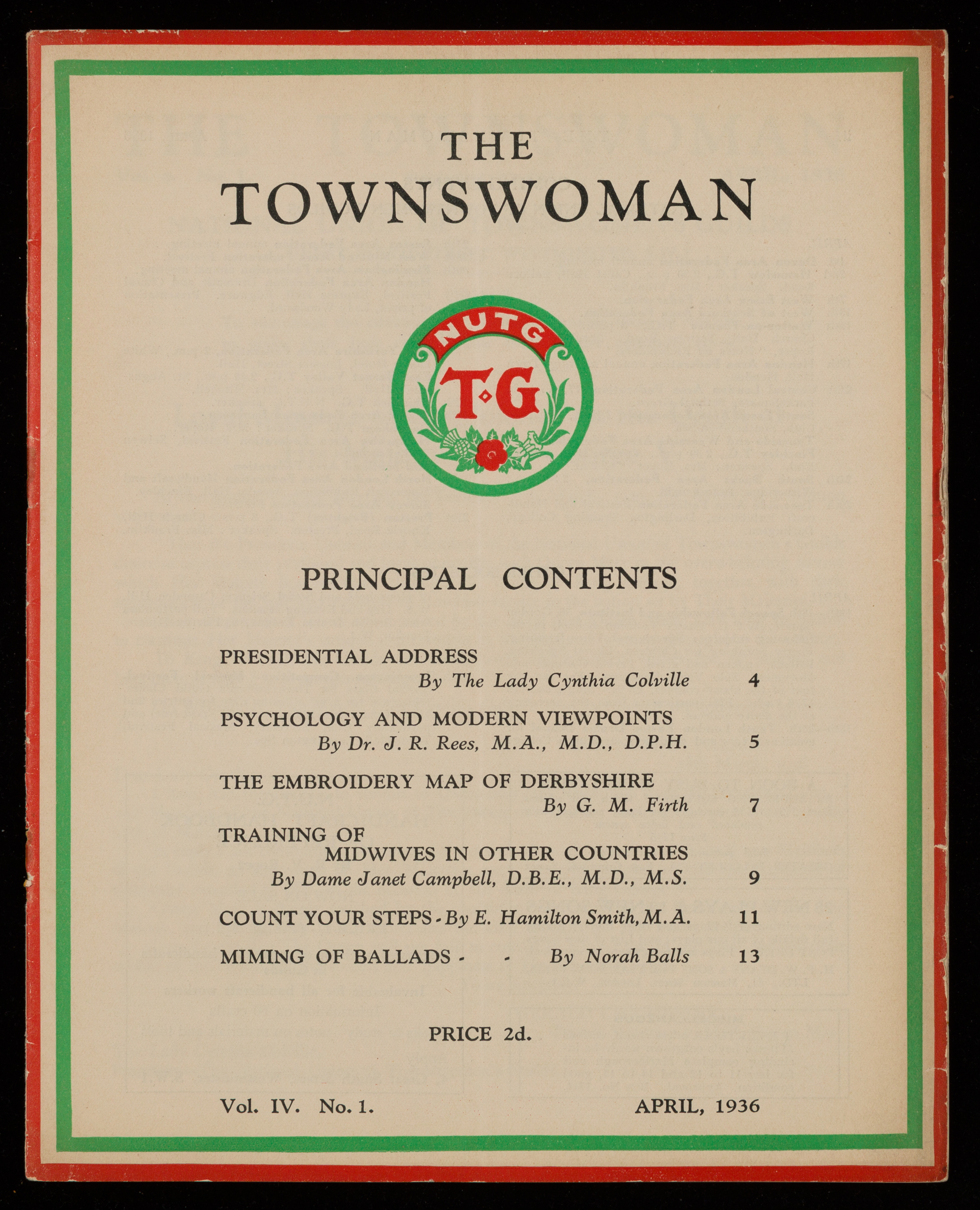
Front cover of The Townswoman. Vol 4. No. 1 1936

In 1928, all women over the age of 21 were given the vote as a result of the Equal Franchise Act irrespective of their property, education or previous interests. The following year the idea of urban Guilds was launched by Margery Corbett Ashby, for women to meet and learn about citizenship and how to use the vote. The idea was to be based on the successful Women's Institutes, but the new guild was designed to appeal to urban women. The original purpose of the Guilds was, “to encourage the education of women to enable them as citizens to make their best contribution towards the Common Good; and to serve as a common meeting ground for women irrespective of creed and party, for their wider education including social activities”. Corbett Ashby was interviewed by the historian, Brian Harrison, as part of the Suffrage Interviews project, titled Oral evidence on the suffragette and suffragist movements: the Brian Harrison interviews, and spoke, in her April 1975 interview, about the formation of the Guild, its early work and the relationship and differences between the Guild and the Women's Institutes. The first Guild was opened in Hayward's Heath. Guilds were able to meet and help others locally by forming Federations.

In 1932, the organisation had 146 guilds and it became the National Union of Townswomen's Guilds and Gertrude Horton became its National Secretary. Alice Franklin became the honorary (ie. unpaid) secretary in 1933. The two of them had published a national handbook from the central offices in Cromwell Place in London in 1938. The handbook included regulations and advice on finance and democracy and how to organise a meeting. Horton gave 3 interviews to Brian Harrison as part of the Suffrage Interviews Project, speaking about the NUTG in all of them, including their formation, the involvement of Corbett Ashby, Hubback and Eleanor Rathbone, and their role as educational rather than feminist in educating new voters and to providing a common meeting ground. She also talks about the organisation of the NUTG, including the finance department, the general office, production 'The Townswoman' and fundraising tea parties. By 1939 there were 544 guilds established with 54,000 members.

During the Second World War, the central organisation was reduced to just Franklin and Horton. They would shelter from bombing in the cellar, and one night in April 1941, Horton lost four members of her family to a bomb in Hampstead. During the war years, the Government asked the NUTG to encourage War married women who were not eligible for National Service to work locally to release others for war work.

1948 saw reorganisation when Mary Courtney, previously President of the Horfield and Bishopston Townwomen's Guild, was elected as the new national secretary. Courtney spoke, in a suffrage interview with Brian Harrison, about the tension between local Guilds and the NUTG, and the departure of Franklin and Horton. Alice Franklin resigned after a dispute, and Horton was forced out the following year. Cynthia Colville, who had taken over as President from Corbett Ashby in 1935, and Joan Loring, Chair of the Executive Committee, also resigned in 1948. Subsequent Presidents included Hilda Gordon Lennox, Duchess of Richmond, and Mary Innes Ker, Duchess of Roxburghe. In the early 1950s, the Guild had over 130,000 members. A member of the Weybridge Guild, Miss E Hamilton Smith, was also interviewed by Brian Harrison and gave her views on the roles and relationships of key players within the Guild during this period as well as the organisation of its HQ at Great Smith Street.

== Campaigns ==
Guilds and Federations took the opportunity to join in the Festival of Britain celebrations in 1951, and continued to campaign on national affairs.

In the 1960s, 1970s and 1980s, members campaigned on issues such as environmental pollution, mixed-sex wards, nuclear power, food additives, prescription charges and carers' rights.

The National Union of Townswomen's Guilds became Townswomen's Guilds in 1989. The following year, nearly £200,000 was raised to plant trees in six new woods, to help the environment and to replace trees lost in storms in the late 1980s. In the 1990s, members continued campaigning on single person supplements, medicinal cannabis and genetic screening.

In the 2000s, members campaigned on post office closures, parental accountability and human trafficking. The 2010s saw campaigns on empty homes, geriatric care in hospitals, gambling advertising, getting rid of cheques, banning FGM and modern slavery.

In 2014, a new logo was introduced. A TG memorial was commissioned in 2017 for the National Memorial Arboretum.

== Other sources ==
- Stott, Mary; Organization woman : the story of the National Union of Townswomen's Guilds, Heineman, 1978
