= Lily Montagu =

British activist (1873–1963)

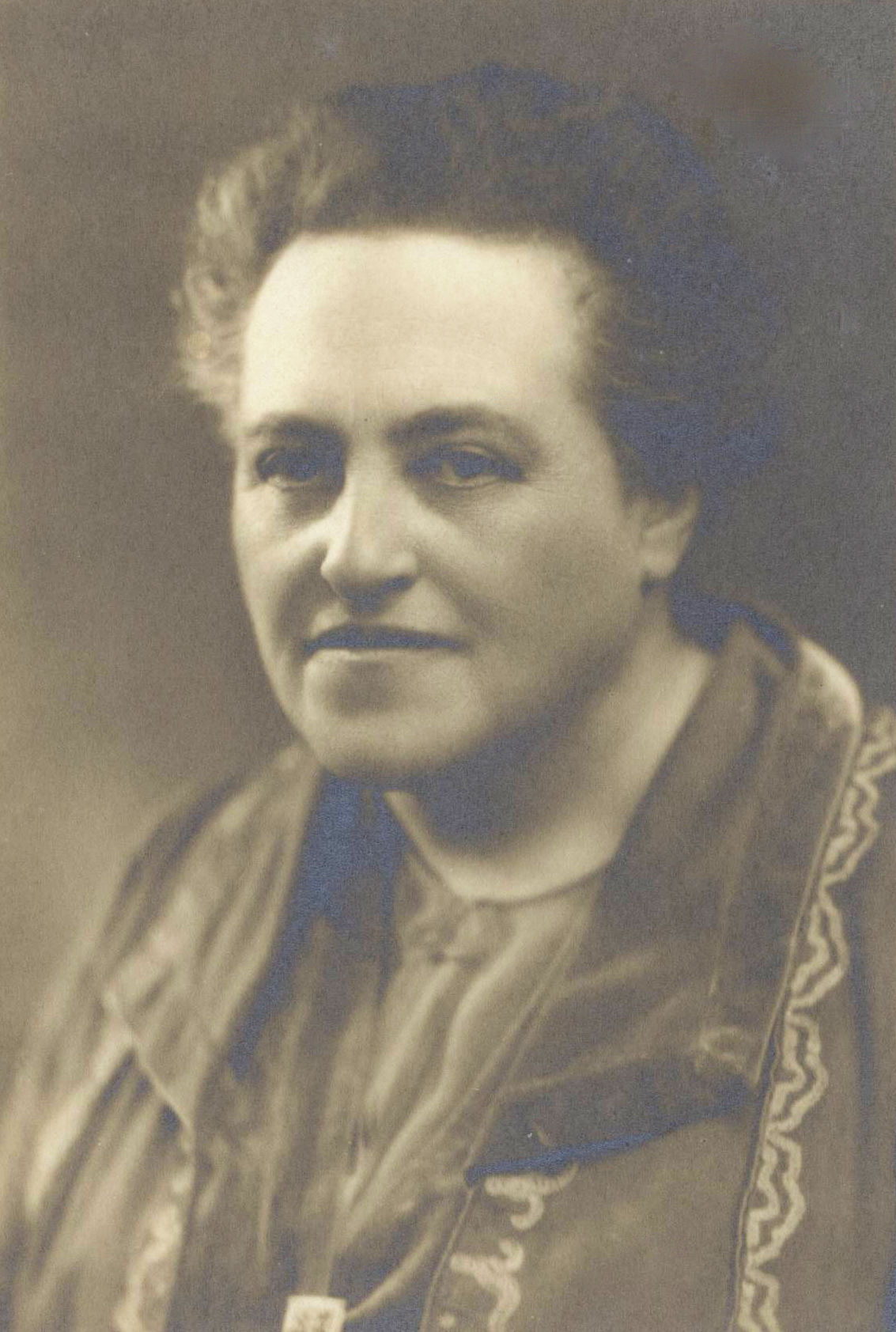
- Montagu c. 1889
- Born: 22 December 1873
- Died: 22 January 1963 (aged 89)
- Organization(s): West Central Jewish Girls Club, Jewish League for Woman Suffrage, World Union for Progressive Judaism
- Father: Samuel Montagu, 1st Baron Swaythling
- Relatives: Louis Montagu, 2nd Baron Swaythling (brother), Edwin Montagu (brother), Venetia Stanley (sister-in-law)

The Hon. Lilian Helen "Lily" Montagu, CBE (22 December 1873 – 22 January 1963) was the first woman to play a major role in Progressive Judaism.

== Life ==
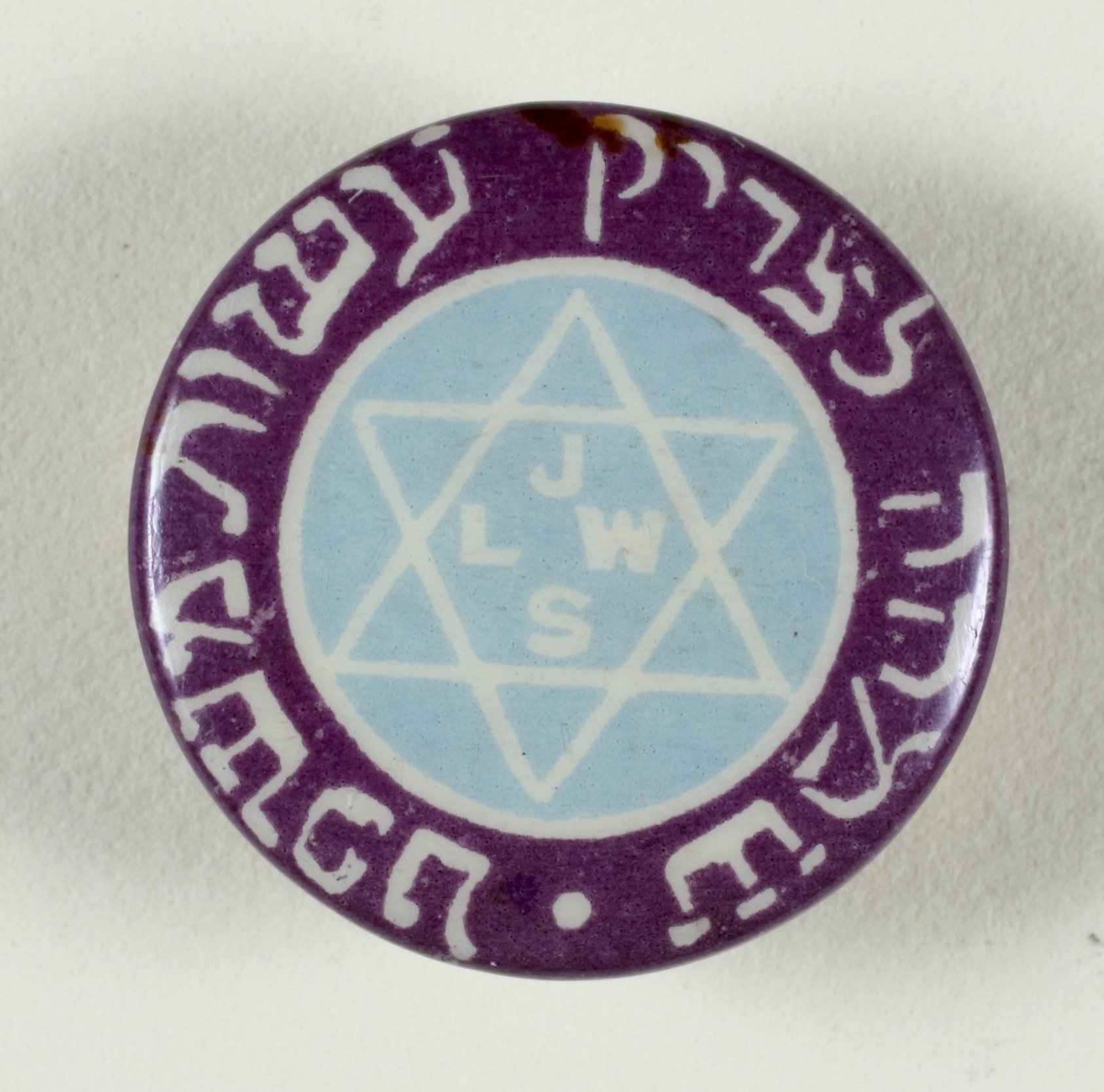
Jewish League for Woman Suffrage badge, from the collection of The Women's Library, London School of Economics and Political Science

Lily Montagu was the sixth of 10 children born to Ellen Cohen Montagu (1843–1919) and Samuel Montagu (1832–1911). Her father, founder of the merchant bank that bore his name, was a self-made millionaire by 1871. He was a Liberal politician who sat in the House of Commons from 1885 to 1900 as the MP for Whitechapel, a poor district of the East End of London. In 1907, Montagu was raised to the peerage as Baron Swaythling.

She grew up in a pious Orthodox Jewish home, in an ethos of privilege and philanthropy, devoted to helping the poor and advancing Jewish institutions. Her eldest brother, Louis, was also a financier and political activist, founding the League of British Jews to lobby against the creation of the state of Israel. Another brother was Edwin, the Liberal politician, who married Venetia Stanley. Two cousins, a pair of brothers, also became Liberal MPs: Sir Stuart Samuel, 1st Baronet, a London Justice of the Peace, and Herbert Samuel, 1st Viscount Samuel, the High Commissioner for Palestine after the Balfour Declaration and eventually Home Secretary.

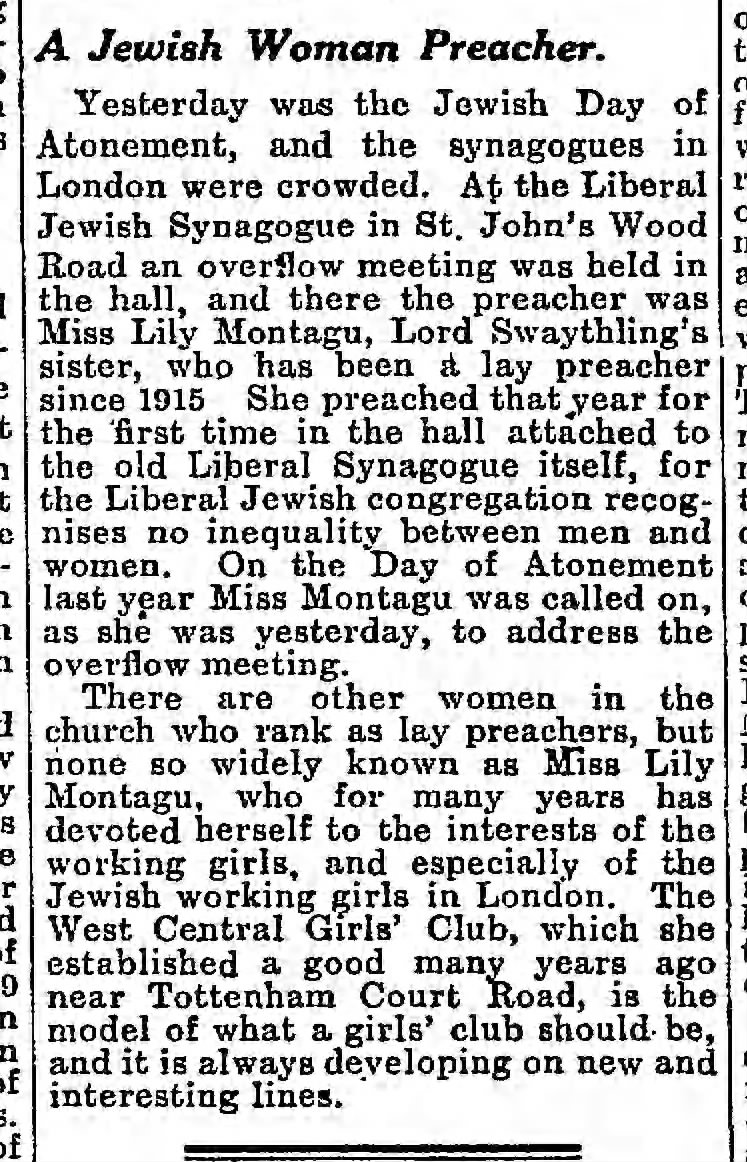
Article in The Guardian (20 September 1926, p. 6)

Lily Montagu was also influenced by Claude Montefiore, a reform-oriented philanthropist and scholar. Until the age of 15, she was educated at Doreck College, and privately educated thereafter.

In 1893 she founded with Emily Marion Harris the West Central Jewish Girls Club (which subsequently merged into the Jewish Girls' Brigade). She was active in social improvement, particularly in respect to unemployment, sweat shops and bad housing.

In 1901 and 1902, Montagu laid the groundwork for the establishment of the Jewish Religious Union in London. In February 1902 she arranged the first meeting of the Jewish Religious Union for the Advancement of Liberal Judaism at her sister Henrietta Franklin's house. The Union set up the first synagogue in Liberal Judaism in the UK and helped found the World Union for Progressive Judaism.

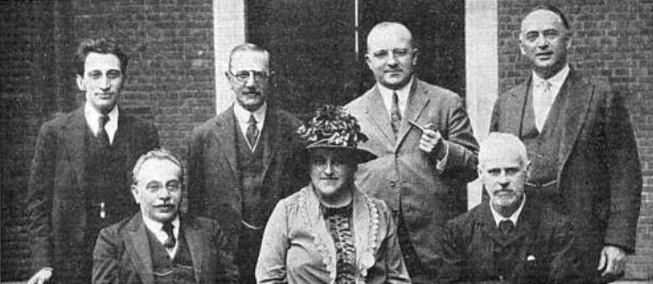
Montagu (centre) at the World Union for Progressive Judaism in 1926

Montagu was a founding member with her sister of the Jewish League for Woman Suffrage. She sat on the executive committee and led the meetings in prayer.

In 1929 she was awarded an honorary degree, Doctor of Hebrew Law, by the Hebrew Union College of Cincinnati, the first woman to receive this recognition.

Following the retirement of Leo Baeck, Montagu served for a brief stint (1955–1959) in her 80s as president of the World Union for Progressive Judaism, before handing the reins over to Solomon Freehof.

== Works or publications ==
- Montagu, L.H. (1899) "The Spiritual Possibilities of Judaism Today". Jewish Quarterly Review. London.
- Montagu, Lilian Helen (1901). Naomi's exodus [A tale]. London: T.F. Unwin.
- Montagu, L.H. (1902) Broken Stalks. R. Brimley Johnson: London.
- Montagu, L.H. (undated – possibly 1903), The West Central Jewish Girls Club, Chapter XXII in book of unknown title. Photocopy in archive of Jewish Museum.
- Montagu, L.H. (1904) 'The girl in the background' in Urwick, E.J. (1904) Studies of Boy Life in Our Cities, J.M. Dent: London.
- Montagu, L.H. (1913) Samuel Montagu: First Baron Swaythling, Born 21 December 1832, Died 12 January 1911: A character sketch. Truslove and Hanson: London.
- Montagu, L.H. (1941) My Club and I: The Story of The West Central Jewish Club, Herbert Joseph: London.
- Montagu, L.H. (1943) The Faith of a Jewish Woman, G. Allen & Unwin: London.
- Montagu, L. (1962) 'The West Central Community' in Magnus, C. L, E.M.J.: The Man and his Work, Published for Private Circulation on behalf of the Ernest M. Joseph Memorial by Valentine, Mitchell London.
- Montagu, Lillian H. (1985). Sermons, addresses, letters and prayers (Studies in women and religion, 15. Supplement to "Lily Montagu and the advancement of liberal Judaism" by Ellen M. Umansky. Includes index) (Ellen M. Umansky ed.). New York: Mellen Press. hdl:2027/mdp.39015011060749. ISBN 9780889465343.
