= Leonard Franklin =

British politician (1862–1944)

Sir Leonard Franklin OBE
- Sir Leonard Franklin in 1940

Member of Parliament for Hackney Central
- In office 6 December 1923 – 9 October 1924
- Preceded by: Sir Arthur Lever
- Succeeded by: Robert Gower
- Majority: 1317

Personal details
- Born: 15 November 1862 London, England
- Died: 11 December 1944 (aged 82) Goudhurst, Kent, England
- Party: Liberal

Sir Leonard Benjamin Franklin OBE (15 November 1862 – 11 December 1944) was an English barrister, banker, and Liberal Party politician of Jewish descent.

== Family ==
Franklin was born in London in 1862, the son of Ellis Abraham Franklin, a banker and his wife Adelaide who was a sister of Samuel Montagu, 1st Baron Swaythling. In this way, Franklin was born into a Liberal family which also included Venetia Stanley, famous correspondent of H H Asquith and future Liberal Party leader, Herbert Samuel. In 1888, Franklin married Laura Agnes Ladenburg and they had one son and three daughters.

== Education ==
Franklin was educated at King's College School, London and the Athenée Royale school in Brussels.

== Career ==
Franklin studied for the law and was called to the Bar at the Inner Temple in 1894, although he never practised. In 1892, he had become a partner in the firm of Keyser & Co. of Throgmorton Street in the City of London, foreign bankers and was a senior partner after 1929.

During the First World War, he was appointed as Local Government Board representative at Folkestone with the task of dealing with the large numbers of refugees from 'gallant little Belgium' when the voluntary War Refugee Committee could no longer cope with the weight of numbers.

For this work he was awarded the OBE. He was later posted to France to report on the finances of British military hospitals. Franklin also served as a Justice of the Peace.

== Politics ==
=== Radical interests ===
Franklin undertook social work in London and was described as an 'ardent Radical.' From 1908, he was Chairman of North Paddington Liberal Association. He served as honorary treasurer of the London Radical Candidates' Association, taking a particular interest housing and traffic.

In 1912, he and his wife Laura founded the Jewish League for Woman Suffrage which campaigned for national women's suffrage and for equal rights for women within the Jewish Faith. They were assisted by the extended Jewish family including Henrietta Franklin and her sister Lily Montagu.

=== 1908–1922 ===
Franklin first stood for Parliament at the December 1910 general election as Liberal candidate in Paddington North. He did not win the seat but he reduced the majority of the sitting Unionist Member of Parliament, Arthur Strauss from 893 to 598 votes. He fought the seat again at the 1918 general election but this time, as a supporter of the Independent Asquithian Liberals he was not favoured with the Coalition coupon and lost his deposit. At this election the former Tory MP, Arthur Strauss, had switched parties and was standing as an Independent Labour candidate. He too lost his deposit.

At the 1922 general election, Franklin fought St Pancras South East constituency but in a three-cornered contest with Conservative and Labour opponents, he came bottom of the poll.

=== 1923–1939 ===
Franklin achieved the only Parliamentary win of his career at the 1923 general election. Standing in Central Hackney in a three-cornered contest, he obtained a majority over the Conservatives of 1,317 votes.

However, he was unable to hold the seat at the 1924 general election, falling to bottom place as the Tories regained the constituency and Labour jumped into second place. Franklin tried to win the seat back at the 1929 general election but again came third in a tight three-way contest, although this time it was the Labour Party which won the seat. Franklin's final attempt to regain Hackney Central came in the 1931 general election. He again came third, although this time by a wider margin, as the Conservatives took the seat back from Labour as the representatives of the National Government. Franklin remained an active supporter of the Liberal Party, playing a prominent role in the activities of the Hackney Central Association, right up until the outbreak of war in 1939.

== Knighthood ==
Franklin was knighted in the King's Birthday Honours List of 1932 for political and public services, becoming a Knight Bachelor.

== Jewish interests ==
Much of the social work which Franklin undertook was based in the Jewish community in London and he also held positions in respect of various synagogues. He was a vice-president of the Jewish Workingmen's Club and of the South Hackney Jewish Social and Literary Society.

== Publication ==
Franklin was a strong supporter of the reform of proportional representation (PR) and invented a system known as Percentage PR. In 1922, he published the book Percentage Proportional Representation.

== Death ==
Franklin died suddenly at his home, The Grange, Goudhurst, Kent on 11 December 1944, aged 82.

Parliament of the United Kingdom
Preceded by Sir Arthur Lever	Member of Parliament for Hackney Central; 1923 – 1924	Succeeded by Robert Gower
