= Shop foreman =

A shop foreman or plant foreman is a front-line supervisor in a skilled trades, manufacturing or production operation: a person who plans, organizes and controls the operations of the shop or plant; supervises, trains and develops staff; provides advice to management and staff; and performs other duties.

The foreman will normally be experienced in the operations performed by the workers under supervision, and foremen are usually promoted from the rank and file to perform this job; but the foreman is technically part of management.
