= Ellis Abraham Franklin =

British merchant banker (1822–1909)

- Born: 5 October 1822; Liverpool, England
- Died: 11 May 1909 (aged 86); London, England
- Occupations: Merchant banker Philanthropist
- Spouse: Adelaide Montagu
- Children: 7 (including Arthur Ellis Franklin and Leonard Benjamin Franklin)

Ellis Abraham Franklin (5 October 1822 – 11 May 1909) was a British merchant banker and philanthropist.

== Early life ==
Franklin was born on 5 October 1822 in Liverpool. His family moved to Manchester, and he was educated at Manchester Grammar School, where he and his brothers would get in trouble due to not giving up their Jewish beliefs. His father was Abraham Franklin (1784–1854), a silversmith and licensed navy agent. He came from a prominent Anglo-Jewish family, originally Fraenkel, that arrived in England from Breslau, Prussia, in the 18th century.

== Career ==
At one point his family considered encouraging Franklin's talents as an artist, but instead he learned from his father's banking business, at one point learning Spanish from a professor at Owen's College in preparation of potentially assisting his brother who was working in the Jamaica branch.

Franklin joined the merchant bank that had been established by Samuel Montagu, married Montagu's sister, Adelaide, and became a partner in 1862. He was married on 9 July 1856 and would ultimately have 7 children.

In 1885, Franklin founded a shelter in Whitechapel called "the poor Jew's temporary shelter". He operated it with his business partner Montagu. The shelter provided 2 meals a day and allowed individuals to stay up to two weeks under its roof.

Early into the 20th century, Franklin retired from their banking enterprise.

== Personal life ==
Franklin's oldest son, Arthur Ellis Franklin (1857–1938), was a British merchant banker and senior partner of A. Keyser & Co. His other son, Sir Leonard Benjamin Franklin (1862–1944), was a barrister, banker and Liberal Party politician. His daughter, Beatrice Franklin, married Herbert Samuel, 1st Viscount Samuel, the Liberal politician who was party leader from 1931-35.

Franklin died on 11 May 1909 in London. Upon his death, he left an estate valued at GB£511,000.

== See also ==
- Rosalind Franklin
