= Keyser Ullman =

- Type: Private
- Founded: 1868
- Founder: Samuel Montagu; Ellis Abraham Franklin
- Key people: Edward du Cann (Chairman, 1970–1975)

Keyser Ullman was a British merchant bank, based in London and founded in 1868.

== History ==
=== Foundation ===
In The Rise of Merchant Banking, Stanley D. Chapman describes Keyser & Co as a "second eleven" for the numerous sons of the Samuels, Montagus, and the Franklins.

=== Demise ===
Sir Edward du Cann, a Member of Parliament (MP) and former chairman of the Conservative Party, was chairman of Keyser Ullman from 1970 to 1975. In October 1974, du Cann and the executive of the 1922 Committee met at du Cann's Keyser Ullman offices in Milk Street, where it was decided that the Committee would press Edward Heath to hold a leadership election, which led to Margaret Thatcher becoming party leader. The press called them the "Milk Street Mafia".

A Department of Trade and Industry report into the failure of Keyser Ullman found du Cann to have been "incompetent" while chairman between 1970 and 1975. "In 1973, the bank lent £17m to a 28-year- old entrepreneur, Christopher Selmes, secured on a valueless guarantee. Mr Selmes later fled the country, leaving debts of more than £20m."

Property developer Jack Dellal (1923–2012) sold his merchant bank, Dalton Barton to Keyser Ullman for £58m just before the secondary banking crisis of 1973–1975 that caused Keyser's failure. Dellal was deputy chairman of Keyser and some have argued that he was "prime culprit" in the failure of Keyser Ullman and du Cann's resulting bankruptcy. Keyser Ullman was saved by the Bank of England and eventually sold to Charterhouse Bank in 1981.
