= Una Duval =

British suffragette (1879–1975)

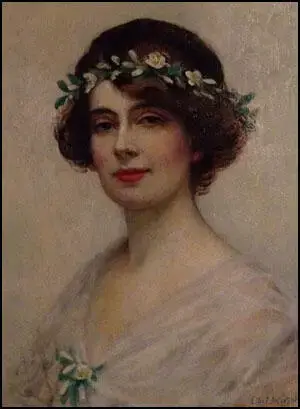
- "Love, Honour and not Obey" portrait by Ethel Wright
- Born: 28 January 1879; Upper Norwood, London, England
- Died: 24 February 1975 (aged 96); St Stephen's Hospital, Chelsea, London, England
- Education: Cheltenham Ladies College
- Known for: Suffragette and marriage reformer
- Spouse: Victor Duval (m. 1912–1945)
- Children: 2, Diana & Elizabeth
- Relatives: Arthur Peel, 1st Viscount Peel (uncle); William Stratford Dugdale MP (grandfather); Elsie Duval (sister-in-law); Hugh Franklin MP (brother-in-law)

Una Harriet Ella Stratford Duval (née Dugdale; 28 January 1879 – 24 February 1975) was a British suffragette and marriage reformer, whose refusal to say "and obey" in her marriage vows made national news. She was imprisoned after taking part in a 1909 protest in Parliament Square.

== Early life ==
Una was the debutante daughter of Commander Edward Stratford Dugdale and his wife, Harriet Ella Portman, who were both supporters of the suffrage movement.

Una was educated at Cheltenham Ladies' College, and later studied singing in Hanover and Paris. She was niece of Arthur Peel, 1st Viscount Peel, Speaker of the House of Commons. Her parents' household had five servants, and they had a holiday home near Aberdeen.

== Activism ==
=== WSPU ===
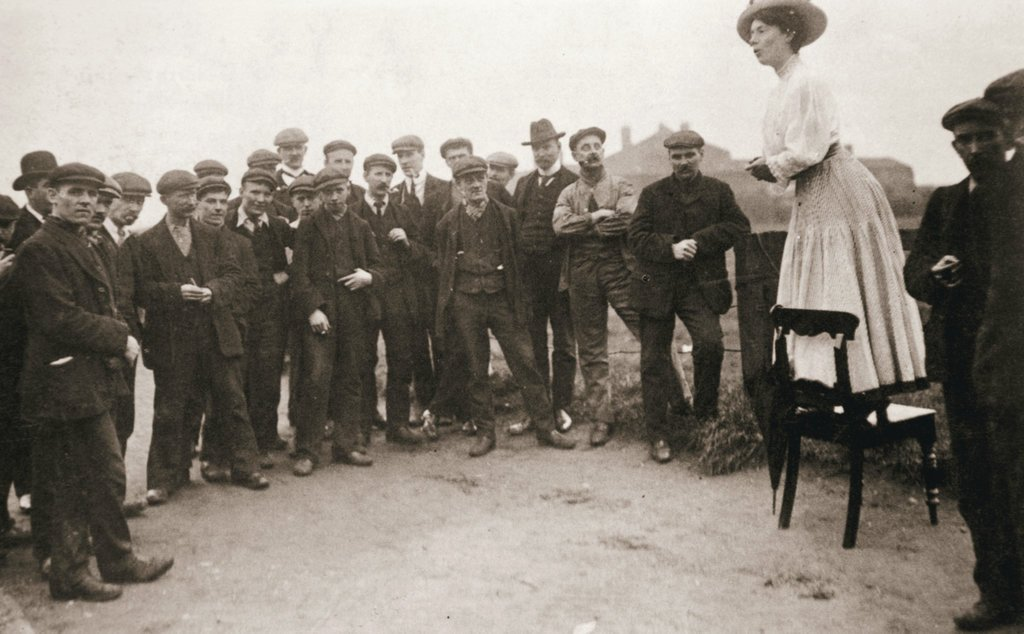
Una Dugdale campaigning at the Newcastle by-election, September 1908.

Una Dugdale was introduced to the suffrage movement by Frank Rutter. In 1907 she first heard Christabel Pankhurst speaking in Hyde Park and from thence on toured the country with Mrs. Pankhurst raising political awareness and helping her in her work. In 1908 she began working with Helen Fraser in Aberdeen, where she addressed the (predominantly male) fisherfolk in Stonehaven. And she was pictured at the by-election in Newcastle in 1908 talking to voters (male) aiming to gain their support.

On 24 February 1909 Una Dugdale was arrested in Parliament Square during a suffragette "raid" on the House of Commons. She remained in prison for one month. During 1909–1910 Dugdale joined Mrs. Pankhurst on her two Scottish tours.

One of her sisters, Marjorie 'Daisy' Dugdale (1884–1973) led the procession to welcome Emmeline and Christabel Pankhurst on their release from prison on 19 December 1908.

=== Marriage Reform ===
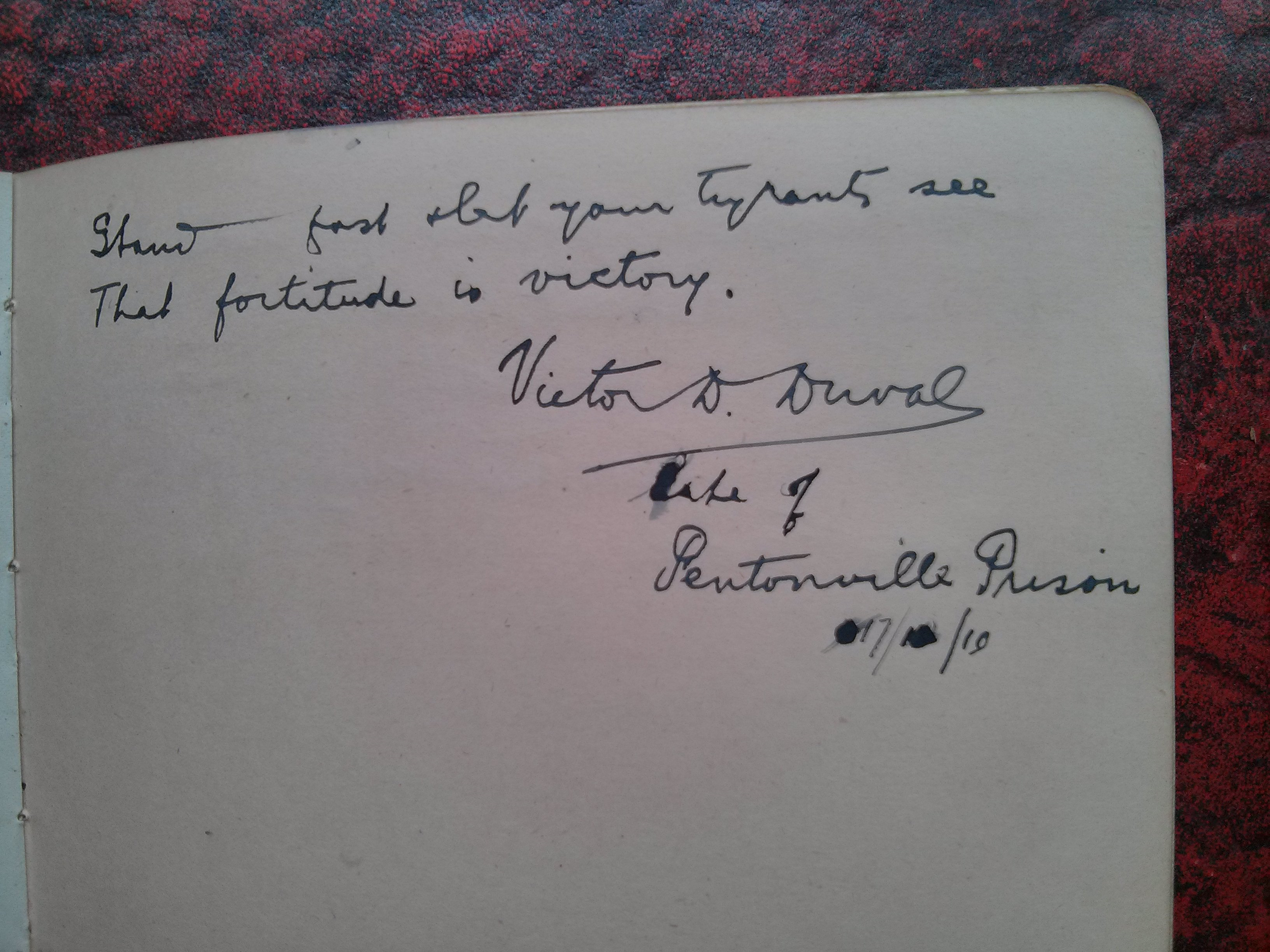
Entry by Victor Duval in Mabel Cappers WSPU prisoners scrapbook October 1910

Dugdale sparked a national scandal in 1912 before she married Victor Diederichs Duval (1885–1945), who she had met when he acted as best man at Frank Rutter's wedding. Dugdale said she would refuse to use the word "obey" in her marriage vows; she was advised that its omission could cast doubt on the legality of the marriage, but nevertheless still refused. The wedding took place at the Savoy Chapel, her father led her down the aisle and Christabel Pankhurst, Constance Lytton and the Pethick-Lawrences attended dressed in WSPU colours.

As a response to the scandal, Dugdale (now Mrs. Duval) wrote To Love Honour – But Not Obey, which argued the case against female obedience to men in marriage, and for greater equality between spouses.

=== The Six Point Group ===
In 1921 Lady Rhondda founded the Six Point Group to campaign for improved legislation on child assault; for the widowed mother; for the unmarried mother and her child; equal rights of guardianship for married parents; equal pay for teachers; and equal opportunities for men and women in the civil service. A number of Suffragists joined, including Una Dugdale, who became one of the Vice Presidents.

=== Suffragette Fellowship ===
After the First World War, Una Duval co-founded The Suffragette Fellowship, an organisation to preserve the memory of the militant suffrage struggle, of which she was the treasurer. An article on the commemoration of the suffrage movement in Women's History Review describes her as vice-chairman of the Fellowship in correspondence with the Museum of London.

== Ethel Wright art collection ==
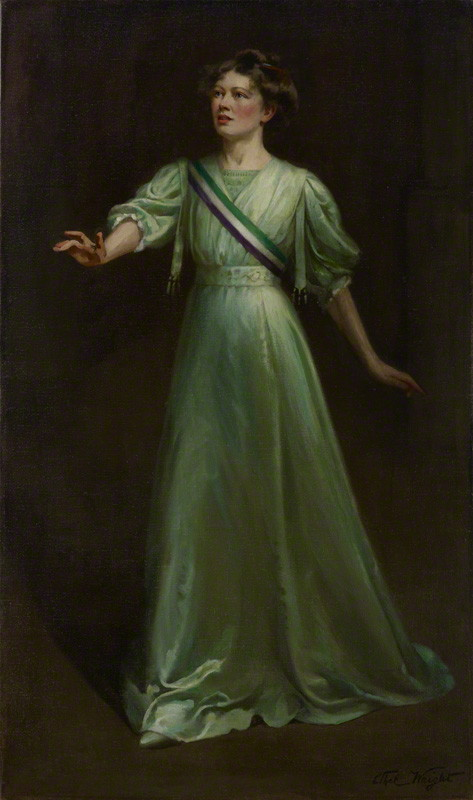
Ethel Wright's "Dame Christabel Pankhurst", 1909

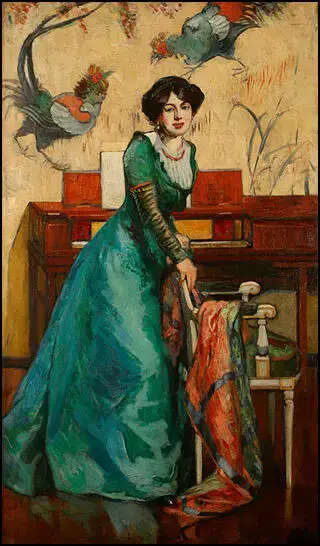
Ethel Wright's "Portrait of Una Dugdale Duval (The Music Room)", 1912

In 1909 a full length portrait of Christabel Pankhurst by Ethel Wright was exhibited at "The Women's Exhibition" hosted by the Women's Social and Political Union. It was funded by Clara Mordan and held at the Prince's Ice Rink in Knightsbridge in May 1909. Duval bought the painting for 100 guineas and it remained in the family until being bequeathed by a descendent of the Duvals to the National Portrait Gallery in 2011, it was first exhibited by them in 2018.

In 1912, the year Una Dugdale married Victor Duval, publishing her pamphlet "Love, Honour and not Obey", she, too, was painted by Ethel Wright. Wright painted a full length portrait of Una Dugdale dressed in bright jade with a background of fierce fighting cocks, entitled "The Music Room". This painting was first shown in London’s Stafford Gallery in the same year. It has remained in the family since, being exhibited as recently as 2020 at the Pallant House Gallery, Chichester and 2024 in Now You See Us: Women Artists in Britain, 1520-1920, Tate Britain, 16 May-13 October 2024.

Ethel Wright was also responsible for the portrait which was featured on Una Duval's marriage reform pamphlet.

== Family ==
In 1912 Una Dugdale married Victor Duval, the founder of The Men’s Political Union for Women’s Enfranchisement. Duval came from a middle class family, all of whom supported votes for women. He was the son of Ernest Charles Augustus Diederichs Duval, a German immigrant of potentially Jewish background, and suffragette Emily Hayes Duval. His sister Elsie, who was a fellow suffragette and wife of suffragist Hugh Franklin, was the second person to be released under the Prisoners (Temporary Discharge for Ill Health) Act 1913 (the so-called "Cat and Mouse law"). His mother and aunt were members of the Jewish League for Women Suffrage.

Una and Victor Duval went on to have two daughters, Diana and Elizabeth. She bequeathed several items relating to the suffrage movement to her family, such as paintings by fellow suffragette Ethel Wright and a WSPU sash stained with her blood.

== In the media ==
On 29 January 1955, Una Duval recorded an interview with John Ellison from the BBC Home Service's In Town Tonight describing how she attempted to storm parliament, was beaten in the street by policemen, and spent time in prison, during the campaign for women's votes.

On 14 February 2024, a writing desk, sash, and other items belonging to Una Duval were featured on Episode 26, Series 11 of the BBC programme The Repair Shop, having been brought in by her granddaughter and great granddaughter.
