= Brown Sugar (1931 film) =

1931 British film by Leslie S. Hiscott

- Theatrical release poster
- Directed by: Leslie S. Hiscott
- Written by: Cyril Twyford
- Based on: play Brown Sugar by Lady Arthur Lever
- Produced by: Julius Hagen
- Starring: Constance Carpenter; Francis Lister; Allan Aynesworth; Helen Haye
- Cinematography: Sydney Blythe; Ernest Palmer
- Production companies: Julius Hagen Productions; Twickenham Film Studios
- Distributed by: Warner Bros. (UK)
- Release date: April 1931 (UK)
- Running time: 70 minutes
- Country: United Kingdom
- Language: English

Brown Sugar is a 1931 British comedy romance film directed by Leslie S. Hiscott and starring Constance Carpenter, Francis Lister, Allan Aynesworth and Helen Haye. It was written by Cyril Twyford based on the play of the same title by Lady Arthur Lever, and produced by Julius Hagen as a quota quickie for distribution by the American company Warner Brothers.

== Plot ==
Young Lord Stone marries musical comedy actress Stella, and his parents do not approve. When Stella's brother-in-law gets into debt, she users her husband's money to help him.

== Cast ==
- Constance Carpenter as Lady Stella Sloane
- Francis Lister as Lord Sloane
- Allan Aynesworth as Lord Knightsbridge
- Helen Haye as Lady Knightsbridge
- Cecily Byrne as Lady Honoria Nesbitt
- Eva Moore as Mrs. Cunningham
- Chili Bouchier as Ninon de Veaux
- Gerald Rawlinson as Archie Wentworth
- Alfred Drayton as Edmondson
- Wallace Geoffrey as Crawbie Carruthers

== Reception ==
Film Weekly wrote: "A spate of dated and stilted dialogue, a mediocre plot and stereotyped acting make this film unfortunately dull."

The Daily Film Renter wrote: "The adapted stage comedy makes poor film entertainment; there is a lack of movement, and the work of the legitimate players in the cast is stilted and emphasises the artificiality of the material. ... This film just dribbles along through seven reels, with a self-conscious cast standing around and talking in a 'manner' that never was on land and sea."

Picture Show wrote: "Plenty of talk but little action, stagily directed."
