= Leeds Arts Club =

Modernist art club founded in Leeds, England

- Formation: 1903; 123 years ago
- Founder: Alfred Orage; Holbrook Jackson
- Dissolved: 1923; 103 years ago
- Type: Avant-garde cultural and political club
- Headquarters: 18 Park Lane (1903–1908); 8 Blenheim Terrace (1908–1923)
- Location: Leeds, Yorkshire

The Leeds Arts Club was founded in 1903 by the Leeds primary school teacher Alfred Orage and Holbrook Jackson, a lace merchant and freelance journalist, and was one of the most advanced centres for modernist thinking, radical thought and experimental art in Britain in the pre-First World War period.

== History ==
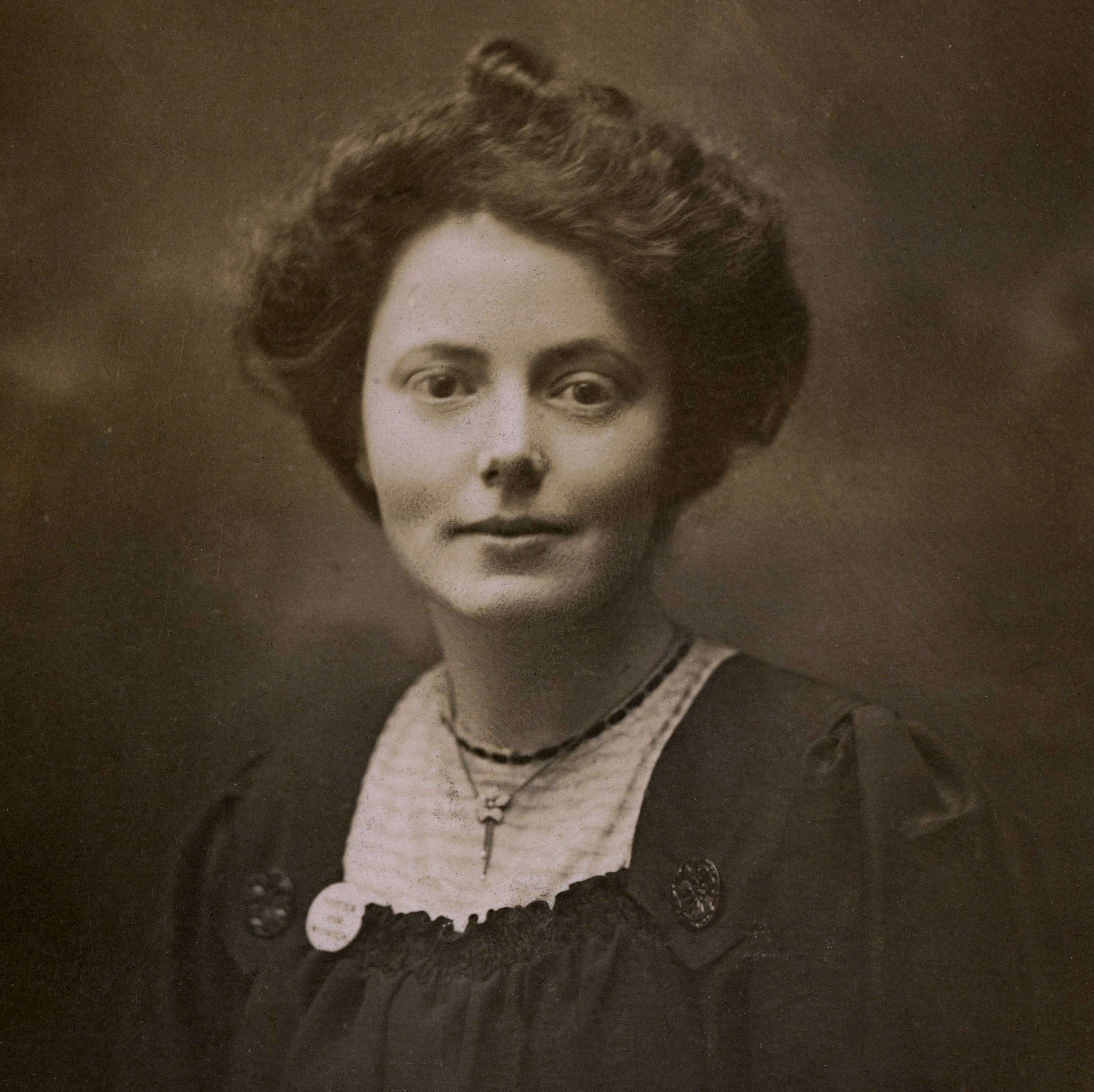
Mary Gawthorpe, 1908

=== 1903–1906 ===
Orage and his friends had made a number of attempts to found a forward thinking arts organisation in the city of Leeds, then an important manufacturing city. The Leeds Arts Club, set up in 1903, was an organisation that mixed radical socialist and anarchist politics with the philosophy of Friedrich Nietzsche, Suffragette Feminism, the spiritualism of the Theosophical Society and modernist art and poetry. It had close associations with the Independent Labour Party, the co-operative movement and the early Fabian Society. At its weekly meetings, members discussed the connections between art, spiritualism, philosophy and politics. The guiding ethos was a kind of existential experimenting dictated by aesthetic concerns where nothing was banned from a moral perspective.

The Club met in rooms on the first floor of Leeds Permanent Building Society on the corner of Park Lane, now Headrow, and Calverley Street. Members included a large number of teachers, many of them women, journalists, architects, artists, photographers, typesetters, printers, clergymen and a few university lecturers.

Orage actively encouraged women members, such as the suffragette and radical editor Mary Gawthorpe, to participate in debates. Gawthorpe describes in her autobiography speakers such as Beatrice Farr, and how the debates led her to appreciate women's experience, such as her friend Ethel Snowden, as well as pointing out the role of Alfred's wife Jean Orage, a textile artist, in challenging Orage to develop his theories and ideas. The pioneer socialist and feminist campaigner, novelist and journalist, Isabella Ford was one of the first supporters of the Club, served as an early committee member and lectured there on 'Women and the State' in 1905, returning to give a lecture in 1907 on 'Women's place in future progress' in the midst of her local and national work on women's suffrage.

Members like Tom Heron, father of Patrick Heron, set up enlightened cooperative businesses, he later set up Cresta Silks following Guild Socialism ideas. The painter William Rothenstein and his brother Charles championed French Impressionist painting, lending examples to exhibitions held at the Club.

Frank Rutter

=== 1906–1911 ===
In 1906 Orage and Jackson left Leeds and moved to London to edit the hugely influential cultural and political journal The New Age. Albert Wheatley Waddington, an architect and former secretary of Edward Carpenter's Sheffield Socialist Society, and Annie Kennedy, a schoolteacher and Jean Orage's cousin, acted as secretary and assistant secretary, developing links with the University of Leeds. The Club continued to host speakers, as well as arranging summer excursions, a life-drawing group, a musical committee, a book group and lending library. In February 1908, the Club moved to 8 Blenheim Terrace, Woodhouse Lane, a 3-storey house near to the University, despite the fact that members were still largely non-university women and men.

In April 1908, the actress and social activist Millicent Murby lectured on George Bernard Shaw and in December 1908, the actress Florence Farr lectured on 'The Theatre and the Arts', reflecting the debates around the role of theatre in cultural renewal that dominated the Club in these years. William Rothenstein lectured on 'The Possibilities of the Fine Arts in February 1908 advocating the need to develop civic collections in relation to provincial schools of art. Many musical performances took place from 1908 on, including by Misses Beecroft and Appleyard, Miss Lily Simms and a talk on 'Musical Healthy Mindedness' by Kate Whitehead, editor of Musical World.

Between 1909 and 1911, national figures like G. K. Chesterton, Yeats and Edward Carpenter lectured at the Club where theatre, religion, politics and ecological issues dominated, photographs by Frank Sutcliffe and Frederick Evans were exhibited. In 1911, the pioneering Elizabeth Bessle Comedy Company gave three performances.

=== 1911–1923 ===
In 1911 and 1912, the appointments of Michael Sadler as the new Vice-Chancellor of the University of Leeds and Frank Rutter as director of the Leeds Art Gallery changed the nature of the Club. Under their leadership the Arts Club maintained its interest in the relationship between radical politics, spiritualism and art, but this was expanded to encompass early psychoanalysis and, most significantly Post-Impressionist and abstract art.

Sadler owned one of the largest collections of Post-Impressionist art in Britain, displayed in his house in Headingley, and had connections to Kandinsky and the Blaue Reiter Group. Sadler's son had bought Kandinsky's woodcuts at an exhibition in 1911 organised by Rutter. Using his personal links with Wassily Kandinsky in Munich, Sadler built up a remarkable collection of expressionist and abstract expressionist art at a time when such art was either unknown or dismissed in London, even by well-known promoters of modernism such as Roger Fry. Most notable in his collection was Kandinsky's abstract painting Fragment for Composition VII, of 1912, which was in Leeds and on display at the Leeds Arts Club in 1913. He also owned Paul Gauguin's celebrated work "The Vision After the Sermon". According to Patrick Heron, Kandinsky even visited the Arts Club in Leeds before the First World War.

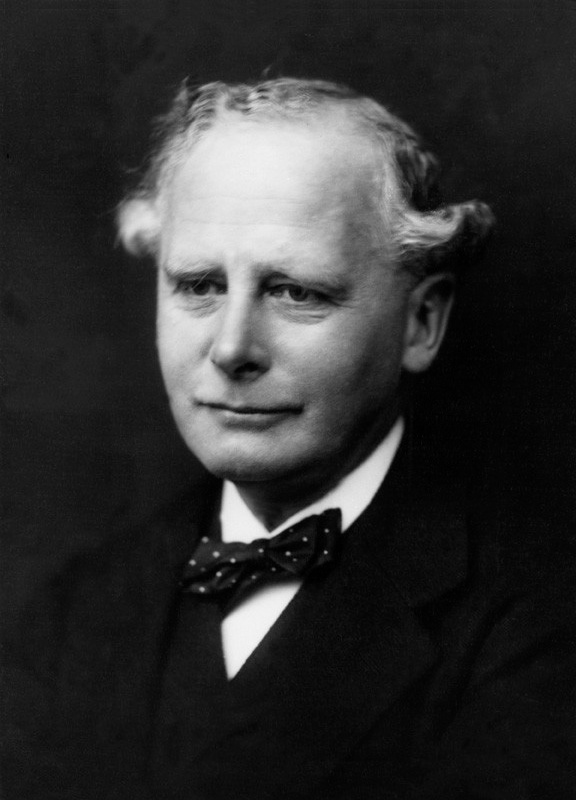
Michael Sadler

Rutter initially had plans to create a modern art collection at the Leeds City Art Gallery, but had been frustrated in this aim by "boorish" local councillors. He co-founded the Leeds Art Collections Fund with Sadler, to help acquisitions and shows, among them, the seminal show in June 1913 of Post-Impressionism held at the Arts Club, with works by Cézanne, Gauguin, Serusier, Kandinsky, Picasso, Van Gogh, Pissarro, Anne Estelle Rice, Ethel Wright and others, lent by Sadler, Rutter and A. M. Daniel, the Lord Mayor of Scarborough. The discussions there about contemporary art, and the presence of Rutter, had a significant influence on the thinking of Herbert Read (1893–1968), who turned 20 in December 1913.

== Legacy ==
The influence of the Arts Club extended into later institutions in London. When Alfred Orage and Holbrook Jackson left Leeds in 1906 they moved to London and began editing the weekly cultural and political journal The New Age. As Tom Steele has argued, this was a self-conscious attempt to expand the reach of the philosophy developed at the Leeds Arts Club to a national audience. Under Orage and Jackson The New Age became, in Steele's words, 'the most influential journal of literature and politics in the country, with regular articles from established writers like G.K. Chesterton, George Bernard Shaw, Hilaire Belloc and Arnold Bennett, reviewing from Ezra Pound and Herbert Read, art criticism and theory from T.E. Hulme and illustrations from Wyndham Lewis, Jacob Epstein and others. It was the cradle of the modern avant-garde in Britain.' A number of these writers had given lectures at the Leeds Arts Club previously – or, like Read, were members – and Steele's argument is that the lively cultural debates that took place at the Leeds Arts Club under Orage and Jackson were effectively continued in the pages of The New Age.

The Leeds Arts Club also became the model for Alfred Orage to establish a new arts club in 1906, this time in London, under the name of the Fabian Arts Group. As well as emulating the cultural, philosophical and political predilections of the Leeds Arts Club, the Fabian Arts Group was an attempt by Orage and others to influence the political outlook of the early Labour Party through one of its founding organisations, the Fabian Society.

A third legacy of the Leeds Arts Club occurred in London in 1947, after the Second World War, when former Leeds Arts Club member, Herbert Read co-founded the Institute of Contemporary Arts, or ICA, again directly emulating the model, combining avant-garde culture, philosophical discussion and political mission, established by Orage and Jackson when they established the Leeds Arts Club.

The Leeds Arts Club was also the starting point for the community theatre project that eventually grew to become the West Yorkshire Playhouse. This began in 1907 as an offshoot of the Leeds Arts Club, called the Leeds Playgoers' Society, and organised both performances of modern plays by writers such as Ibsen, Shaw and Chekov, and lectures on drama, which continued to be held in collaboration with the Leeds Arts Club. This later evolved into the Leeds Playhouse, the forerunner to the West Yorkshire Playhouse.

Leeds Civic Trust commemorated the Leeds Arts Club by a blue plaque on number 8 Blenheim Terrace where it met from 1908 to 1923, opposite the University of Leeds. The plaque was unveiled on 15 May 2012, by Ingrid Roscoe, Lord Lieutenant of West Yorkshire, and a speech was made by Tom Steele, author of Alfred Orage and The Leeds Arts Club. The plaque had been suggested by Ben Read, art historian and son of Herbert Read. The inscription is:

THE LEEDS ART CLUB A highly influential forum for the avant-garde in politics, philosophy, art and literature met here from 1908. Ground-breaking exhibitions included the 1913 Post-Impressionist show and Cubist and Futurist Art in 1914. Famous speakers included G.B. Shaw and W.B. Yeats. 1903–1923

Key themes were the interest in Nietzsche, Guild socialism, impressionist and post-impressionist painting and Kandinsky's Aesthetic Theory. Artists, thinkers and writers inspired by the Club include Isabella Ford, Mary Gawthorpe, Jacob Kramer and Herbert Read. Political, literary and cultural figures, both men and women, lectured at the Club. The Club also staged exhibitions and theatrical performances.

It has been argued by the art historian Michael Paraskos that the Leeds Arts Club was the closest England came to a genuine expressionist art movement. This is evidenced partly by the Arts Club's artistic, philosophical and political interests, which mirror those seen in German expressionist art groups of the time, and through its direct links to Kandinsky in Germany. It also produced its own expressionist artists, including Jacob Kramer and Bruce Turner.

It also was the seed ground from which the anarchist poet, art critic and art theorist Herbert Read emerged, and Read's basic dialectical theory of art, which became one of the main methods to understand modernism between the 1930s and 1960s, has its roots in the understanding of art expounded at the Leeds Arts Club.
