= Brown Sugar (1922 film) =

1922 British film by Fred Paul

- Directed by: Fred Paul
- Written by: Lady Arthur Lever (play) Walter Summers
- Produced by: G.B. Samuelson
- Starring: Owen Nares; Lillian Hall-Davis; Eric Lewis; Henrietta Watson
- Production company: British-Super Films
- Distributed by: Jury Films
- Release date: 1922
- Country: United Kingdom
- Language: English

Brown Sugar is a 1922 British silent romance film directed by Fred Paul and starring Owen Nares, Lillian Hall-Davis and Eric Lewis. It was based on a play by Lady Arthur Lever.

== Cast ==
- Owen Nares – Lord Sloane
- Lillian Hall-Davis – Stella Deering
- Eric Lewis – Earl of Knightsbridge
- Henrietta Watson – Countess of Knightsbridge
- Cyril Dane – Edmundson
- Margaret Halstan – Honoria Nesbitt
- Louise Hampton – Miss Gibson
- Gladys Harvey – Mrs. Cunningham
- Eric Leighton – Crowbie Carruthers
