= Frank Rutter =

British art critic, curator and activist

- Frank Rutter, portrait by Gerald Kelly, 1910
- Born: 17 February 1876; Putney, London, England
- Died: 18 April 1937 (aged 61); Golders Green, London, England
- Other name: Francis Vane Phipson Rutter
- Occupations: Art critic, curator
- Known for: Promoting Impressionism in Britain

Francis Vane Phipson Rutter (17 February 1876 – 18 April 1937) was a British art critic, curator and activist.

In 1903, he became art critic for The Sunday Times, a position which he held for the rest of his life. He was an early champion in England of modern art, founding the French Impressionist Fund in 1905 to buy work for the national collection, and in 1908 starting the Allied Artists Association to show "progressive" art, as well as publishing its journal, Art News, the "First Art Newspaper in the United Kingdom". In 1910, he began to actively support women's suffrage, chairing meetings, and giving sanctuary to suffragettes released from prison under the Cat and Mouse Act—helping some to leave the country.

From 1912 to 1917, he was the curator of Leeds City Art Gallery. In 1917, he edited the cultural journal Art & Letters with Herbert Read. In his writing after World War I, Rutter observed that advertising imagery was seen by far more people than work in art galleries; he noted a new realism after the period of "abstract experiment", and he praised the work of Dod Procter as a "complete presentation of twentieth century vision".

== Early life ==
Frank Rutter was born at 4 The Cedars, Putney, London, the youngest son of Henry Rutter (died 1896) and Emmeline Claridge Phipson, daughter of Samuel Ryland Phipson, a landowner and stock- and share-broker from a family of pin and needle manufacturers. His grandfather, John, and his father were both prosperous solicitors with chambers in Clifford's Inn, Holborn, and both had acted for John Ruskin, John assisting on Ruskin's marriage nullification with Euphemia (Effie) Gray; Henry severed the connection with Ruskin, after the latter rejected his counsel on a property transaction.

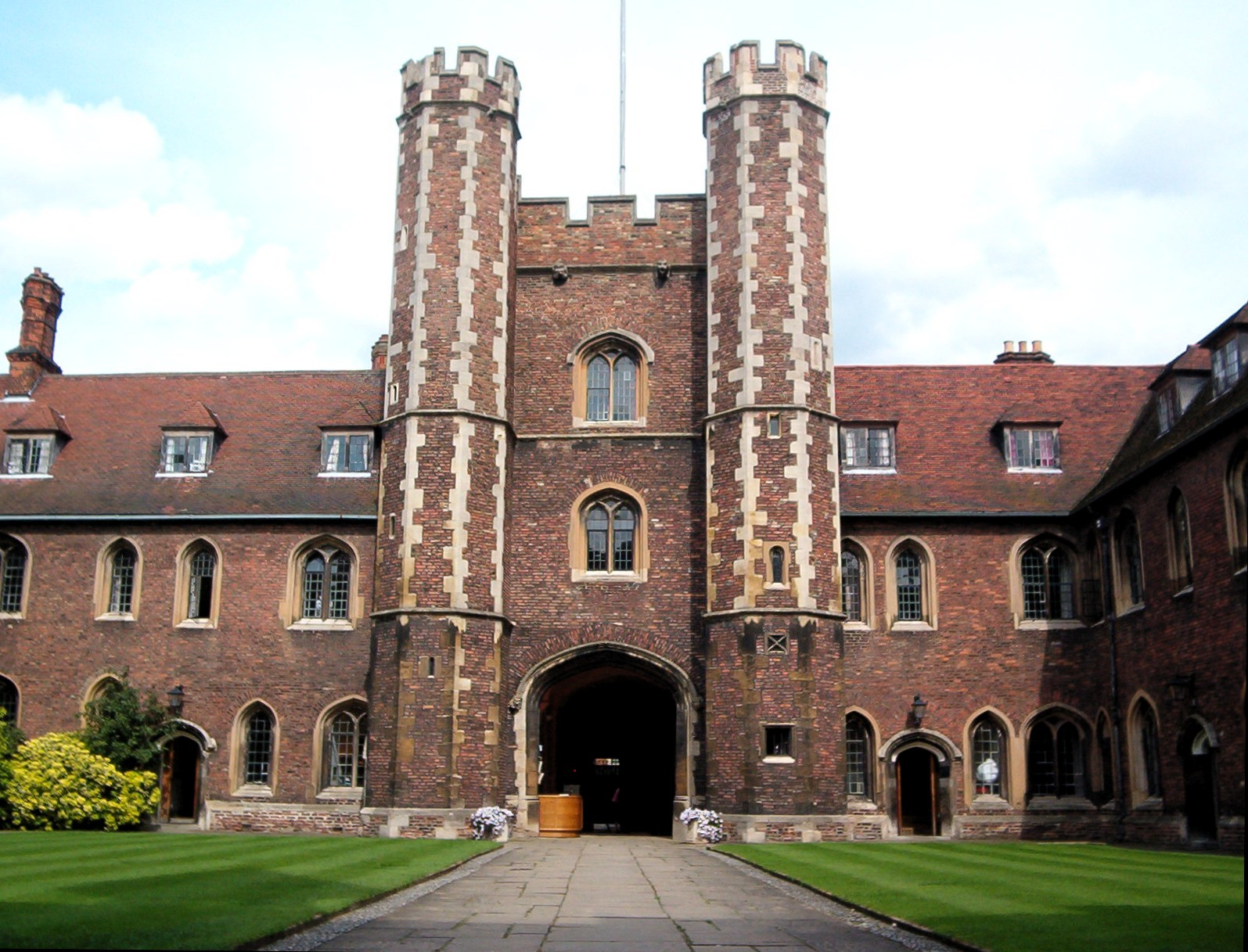
Old Court Gatehouse of Queens' College, Cambridge

From 1889, Frank Rutter was educated at Merchant Taylors' School, at that time in Aldersgate, where he specialised in Hebrew (under the influence of his father whose hobby was Biblical archaeology) and where pupils were expected to gain Oxbridge scholarships or exhibitions in classics: Rutter, aged seventeen tried but failed to gain a scholarship in history at Exeter College, Oxford, but was successful in the Queens' College, Cambridge, examination for a scholarship in Hebrew, going to university in 1896 and gaining the Semitic Language Tripos (degree) in 1899.

Whilst still at school, Rutter, along with a fellow sixth form student, Edgar D., explored London nightlife, visiting music halls, eating out in Gatti's Restaurant and joining nightclubs, which were then an adjunct to the more formal London's gentleman's club, providing a dining room, ballroom, writing room, and female membership, which was not taken up by respectable women in society, although the male membership was mostly respectable; Rutter's father happily financed these activities.

When at Cambridge, Rutter gained popularity through his banjo-playing, and, thanks to the good train service available, extended his social pursuits to Paris, first visiting in 1898, speaking French fluently and often staying for a month at a time in the city, where he made friends in the Latin Quarter.

After university, spent a few months as an itinerant tutor, then began as a freelance writer in London with a newly acquired typewriter. One of his successful interviews was with Bernard Shaw on the subject of housing problems—the text of which was entirely provided by Shaw himself; The Times printed an interview with the American scout, Major Burnham, on his return from South Africa.

He obtained posts as assistant editor of To-day and the Sunday Special, both part of the same publishing group. In February 1901, he became sub-editor of the Daily Mail, and began to write art criticism, mostly for The Financial Times and The Sunday Times. In 1902, he went back to To-day as editor for two years, and for a short time brought it back into profit, until it succumbed to cheaper competition and was merged with London Opinion. In 1903, Leonard Rees appointed him art critic of The Sunday Times, a post he held for the rest of his life, 34 years in all. Rutter honed his skills whilst doing the job, and also made the acquaintance of leading artists in Paris through frequenting the cafés.

== The French Impressionist Fund ==
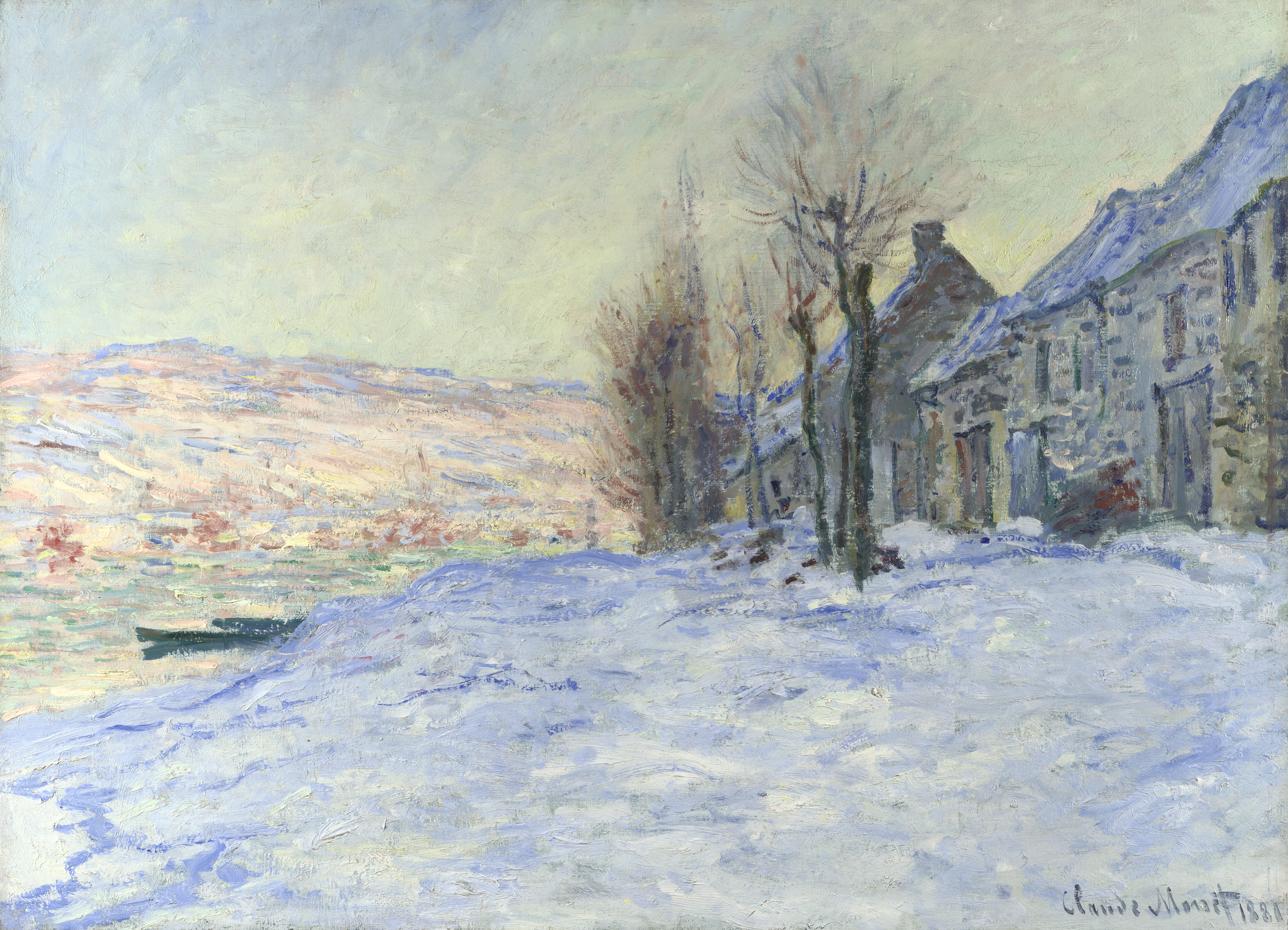
Claude Monet, Lavacourt Under Snow, 1878–1881. Rutter's unsuccessful, too "advanced", choice for the National Gallery.

In 1903 the creation of the National Art Collections Fund initiated many years of frustration for Rutter, who believed it would siphon off available money from his own aims. He was a strong supporter of Impressionist and Expressionist Modernism. He considered "perfectly dreadful" the lack of such work in the national collections, pointing out in 1905 that the only example of the modern French school was Edgar Degas' The Ballet from Robert the Devil (1876) in the Victoria and Albert Museum.

Raging with indignation, he wrote articles on this omission, gave lectures, and, galvanised by the opening of the Impressionist exhibition staged by Durand-Ruel at the Grafton Galleries in London in 1905, he persuaded the editor and proprietors of The Sunday Times to allow space for a public subscription, the French Impressionist Fund. Sargent and Wertheimer each sent ten guineas; Blanche Marchesi staged a fund-raising concert; Rutter, although "extremely nervous" gave his first lecture at the Grafton Galleries. Sir Claude Phillips and D.S. MacColl joined him on the executive committee of the fund, and contributions slowly mounted up to £160, sufficient at that time to buy a top class Impressionist painting.

Rutter's choice was Monet's Vétheuil: Sunshine and Snow (since retitled Lavacourt under Snow), which MacColl was in favour of and Durand-Ruel had promised to sell for the amount collected, but Phillips pointed out that National Gallery did not accept work by living artists; discreet enquiries revealed that the gallery trustees also found too "advanced" Manet, Sisley and Pissarro: "They were certainly dead—but they had not been dead long enough for England", wrote Rutter, adding "I nearly wept with disappointment."

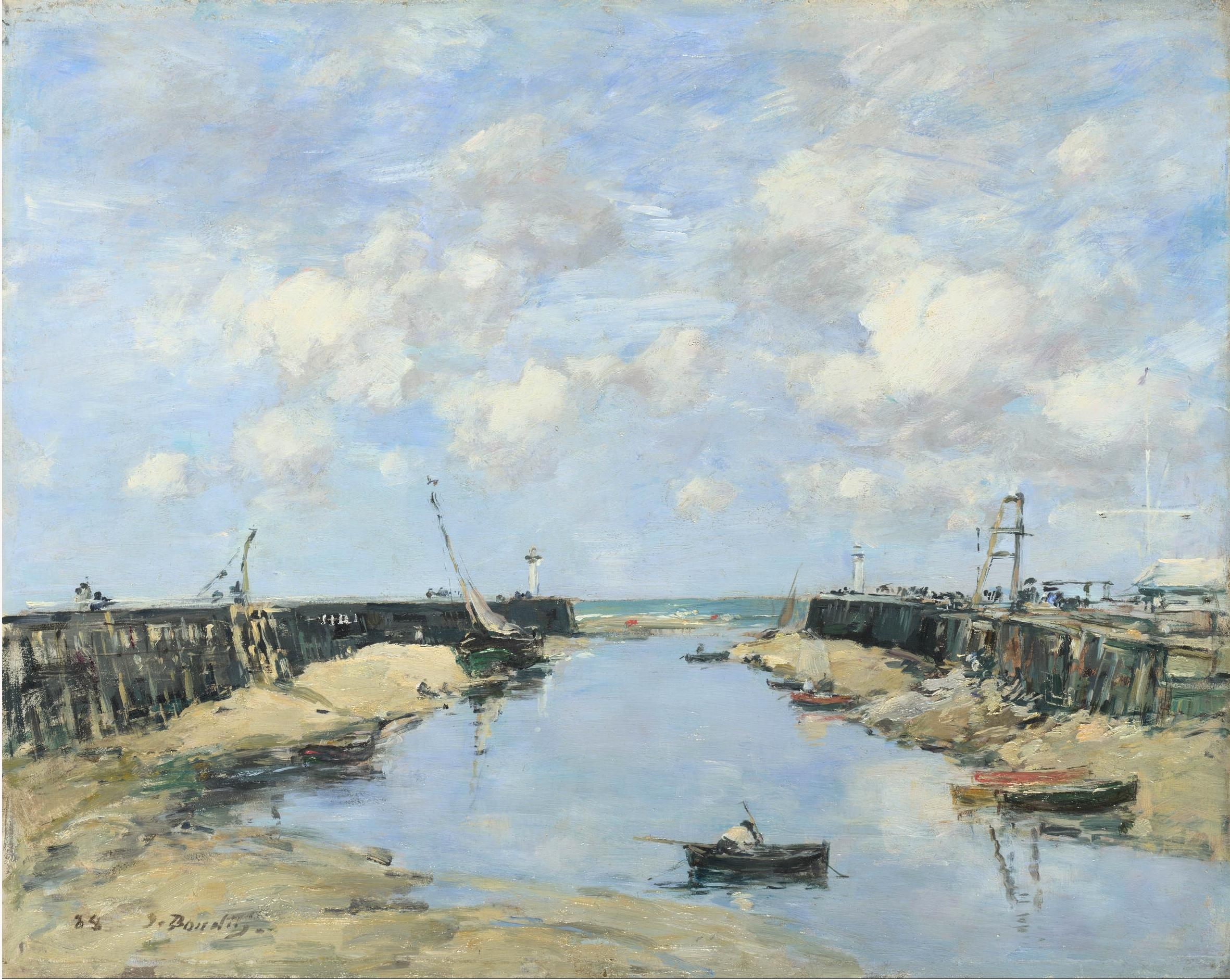
Eugène Boudin. The Entrance to Trouville Harbour, 1888. The National Gallery accepted this painting.

MacColl ascertained that the trustees would accept Eugène Boudin, who Rutter protested was not an Impressionist but whom he accepted out of necessity, mollified by MacColl's argument that "he's the beginning of Impressionism and we can make a start with him." To avoid any accusations of logrolling Durand-Ruel's exhibition, they agreed that Rutter would travel to Van der Veldt, a private collector in Le Havre, to choose a Boudin painting. He brought back as personal luggage Boudin's 1888 painting, Entre les jetées, Trouville (The Entrance to Trouville Harbour), and wrote to MacColl on 11 October 1905 to inform him of the work he had selected, which Van der Veldt had accepted £120 for provided it would go to a national collection and which was waiting at the Goupil Gallery for MacColl to see.

It was shown privately at the Goupil Gallery for the subscribers, and presented in January 1906 to the National Gallery through the National Art Collections Fund, which Rutter said was keen to act as a channel for the prestigious presentation, but had not given "the slightest help or encouragement when I needed it most." It made Rutter "boil with rage" to contrast this with the Fund's spending of thousands of pounds on older paintings; he said, "the Fund's inertia and snobbish ineptitude are entirely characteristic of the art-officialdom in England."

== Allied Artists' Association ==
While in Paris in 1907, Rutter had the idea for gaining greater exposure for progressive artists with the Allied Artists Association (AAA), founded the following year and based on the model of the French Salon des Indépendants with the principle of non-juried shows of international artists, who could subscribe and choose which works they wished to enter (initially five pieces, later three).

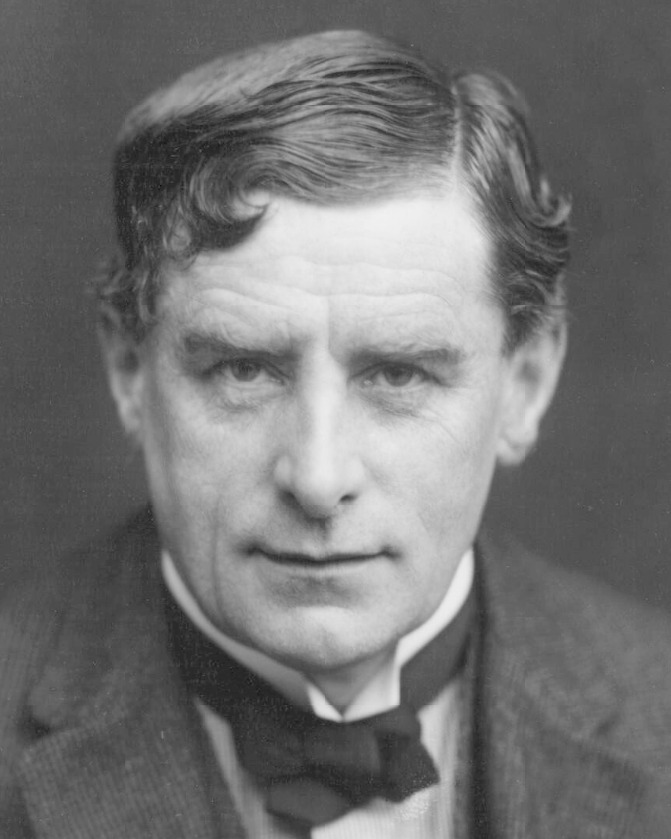
Walter Sickert

Rutter was a supporter of the Fitzroy Street Group, which had been founded in 1907, and succeeded in gaining the support of key members, Walter Sickert, Spencer Gore and Harold Gilman, for the AAA. Rutter was a natural organiser and, with the help of Lucien Pissarro attracted 80 members. Rutter was keen to mount a foreign section in the first show, and liaised over this with Jan de Holewinski (1871–1927), who was in London to arrange a Russian art and craft show. The first AAA show in July 1908 was in the Royal Albert Hall and had over 3,000 works on display.

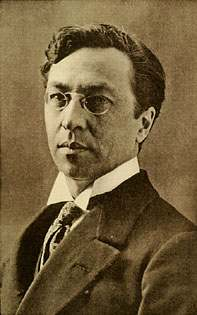
Wassily Kandinsky c. 1913

In 1909, at the second show in the Royal Albert Hall, over 1,000 works were shown, mainly by British artists, but also the first works (two paintings and twelve woodcuts) exhibited in London by Wassily Kandinsky. Rutter's friends in Leeds, Michael Sadler and his son, Michael Sadleir (who had modified the spelling of his surname) developed a relationship with Kandinsky, who assigned English translation rights for Concerning the Spiritual in Art to Sadleir.

Rutter was secretary of the AAA and organised it for four years. It was artistically accomplished, but not so financially. Through the AAA, Rutter helped many artists, such as Charles Ginner, who, although not achieving outstanding success, was able to gain an audience and develop a loyal following for his work. The AAA exhibited also for the first time in London Constantin Brâncuși, Jacob Epstein, Robert Bevan and Walter Bayes.

From October 1909 to 1912, Rutter also published and edited the weekly, cheaply printed Art News (sold for 2d a week), the journal of the AAA, like which it had an open-door policy on contributors, featuring the lectures given to the Royal Academy Schools by Sir William Blake Richmond, as well as Sickert's attack on the Royal Academy, "Straws from Cumberland Market", his column on topical issues being the main attraction. It was promoted as the "First Art Newspaper in the United Kingdom".

== Suffragettes, Post-Impressionism, and Leeds ==
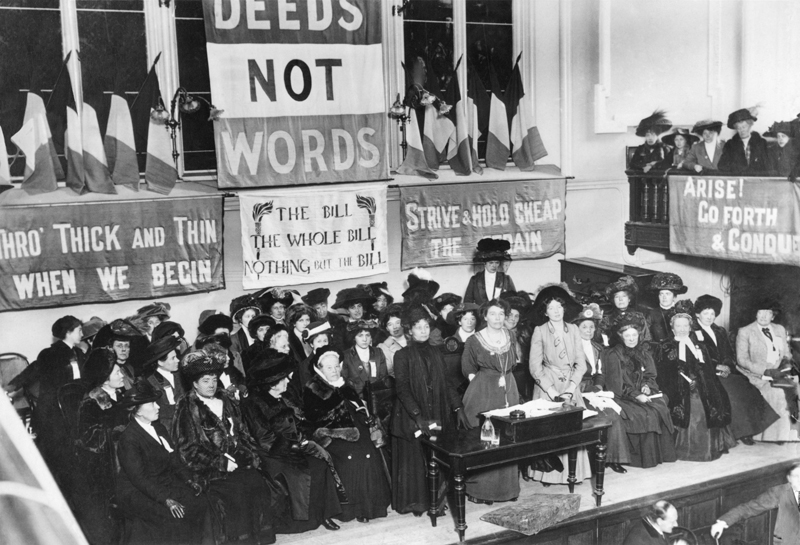
Suffragettes in England, 1908

On 30 August 1909 Rutter married Thirz Sarah (Trixie, born 1887/8), whose father, James Henry Tiernan, was a member of the New Zealand Police. With the encouragement of George Bernard Shaw, Rutter became a member of the Fabian Society.

On 12 January 1910, at the Eustace Miles Restaurant, Rutter chaired the meeting of a group which developed into the Men’s Political Union for Women’s Enfranchisement, of which he was the honorary treasurer. Four months later he was the speaker representing the Press at the John Stuart Mill Celebrations, which were staged by the Women's Freedom League.

In 1910, Roger Fry occupied the limelight of avant-garde campaigning for art, when he outraged the public with the exhibition Manet and the post-impressionists at the Grafton Galleries, showcasing work by Van Gogh, Gauguin and Cézanne. Rutter had put the term "Post-Impressionist" in print in Art News of 15 October 1910, three weeks before Fry's show, during a review of the Salon d'Automne, where he described Othon Friesz as a "post-impressionist leader"; there was also an advert in the journal for the show The Post-Impressionists of France.

Rutter quickly supported Fry's venture with a small book Revolution in Art (enlarged in 1926 as Evolution in Modern Art), its title derived from Gauguin's statement that "in art there are only revolutionists or plagiarists." Rutter wrote in the dedication: "To Rebels of either sex all the world over who in any way are fighting for freedom of any kind I dedicate this study of their painter-comrades."

On 25 March 1911, Rutter chaired a meeting of the Men's Political Union at Caxton Hall, Westminster, and reported that a recent court case at Leeds, in which Alfred Hawkings had been awarded £100 damages for being ejected from a meeting, was "a distinct victory for the suffragist cause." Rutter roused cheers from his listeners upon exhorting them that they needed to prove to their opponents that "the reign of bullying, tyranny, and savagery must come to an end."

Rutter's Art News reported on the AAA show of July 1911 and also printed the Futurist Painters Manifesto (first printed as the Technical Manifesto of Futurist Painting in February 1909 in Le Figaro). In April 1912, because of financial difficulties, Rutter resigned as secretary of the AAA, which had been strongly supported by Lucien Pissarro, Walter Sickert and others, but which he felt was nevertheless dwindling away due to what he condemned as "the incurable snobbishness of the English artist". That year he relocated from London to Leeds for the next five years, having been appointed curator of the Leeds City Art Gallery at a salary of £300 per annum. He continued to advocate new ventures in art through his column "Round the galleries" in The Sunday Times.

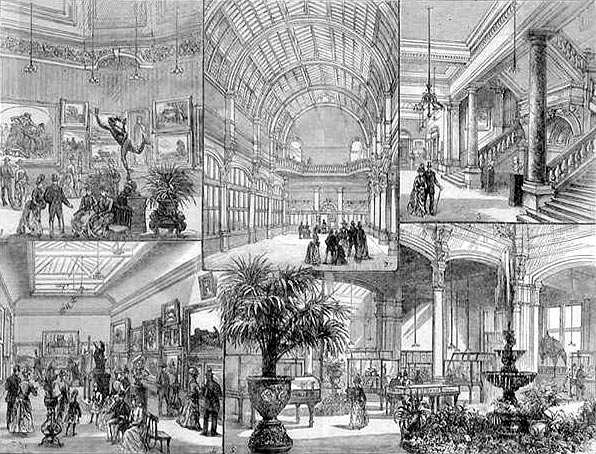
Opening of Leeds City Art Gallery in 1888 from The Illustrated London News

He used his house at 7 Westfield Terrace, Chapel Allerton, Leeds, to provide accommodation for suffragettes released from prison under the Cat and Mouse Act and recovering from hunger strike. In 1913, he provided a character reference so that a job could be obtained in Europe by a "mouse", Elsie Duval; another, Lilian Lenton, a suffragette arsonist also escaped via his home to France in June that year with the aid of his wife. Elizabeth Crawford, author of The Women's Suffrage Movement, suggests that other similar events must have taken place, but were kept quiet at the time out of necessity and, later, due to Rutter's taciturnity. He wrote in an epilogue to his autobiography:

the only furiously active part of my life was the few years during which I was connected with the militant suffrage movement and of this I have said nothing, because if I once began I should want to fill a volume with my experiences during this exciting time. It is all over now, the battle has been won, and this is not the place in which to recount the skirmishes in which I had the honour to take part."

He did not agree with the later, more extreme tactics of the WSPU leaders, who nevertheless still commanded his respect and admiration. He encouraged the artist, Emily Susan Ford (1850–1930), vice-chairman of the Artists' Suffrage League, and exhibited her work in the Leeds gallery.

Rutter initially had plans to create a modern art collection at the Leeds gallery, but had been frustrated in this aim by "boorish" local councillors; his association with the escape of Lilian Lenton had further damaged his standing. Before he left the city, he co-founded the Leeds Art Collections Fund with Michael Sadler, who was the vice-chancellor of Leeds University and a collector of work by Kandinsky and Gauguin. The Fund helped with acquisitions and shows, among them the first major John Constable show and another in June 1913 of Post-Impressionism held at the Leeds Arts Club, which had been started by Holbrook Jackson and A. R. Orage, editor of The New Age, and was galvanised by the new activity. The discussions there about contemporary art had a significant influence on the thinking of Herbert Read (1893–1968), who was introduced to modern art by Rutter. Rutter's plan for a literary version of the AAA had a strong appeal for Read.

== Futurism ==
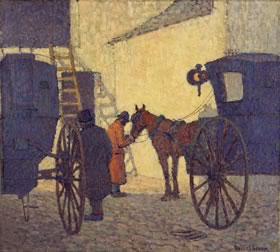
Robert Bevan. The Cabyard, Night.

In October 1913, Rutter was commissioned by the Doré Gallery at 35 Bond Street in the West End to curate the Post-Impressionist and Futurist Exhibition, which displayed the story of those movements from Camille Pissarro to Vorticist Wyndham Lewis (who was no longer on good terms with Fry). Rutter's choice of Pissarro as a starting point was in contradistinction to the stance of Fry and the Bloomsbury Group, who saw Cézanne as the beginning of modern art.

Rutter made a link between the British artists he supported and the French intimiste painters, as well as featuring artworks by Severini and Boccioni of the Italian Futurism movement—which had been shown in London first by the Sackville Gallery—and by Brâncuși, Epstein, Delaunay and Signac. Rutter's consummate curation and catalogue foreword were a testament to his deep knowledge of the subject. He praised Nevinson's The Departure of the Train De Luxe as "the first English Futurist picture".

Fry told Rutter that Fredrick Etchells from his Omega Workshops had nothing ready to show, and failed to forward a letter from Rutter to Wyndham Lewis, who nevertheless showed the large Kermesse, which, together with Delaunay's similarly sized Cardiff Football Team, made a centerpiece for the show.

The Cabyard, Night, the only painting by Robert Bevan acquired for a public collection during the artist's lifetime, was bought by the Contemporary Art Society on Rutter's recommendation that they should obtain it for the nation before a more discerning collector bought it.

== Art & Letters ==
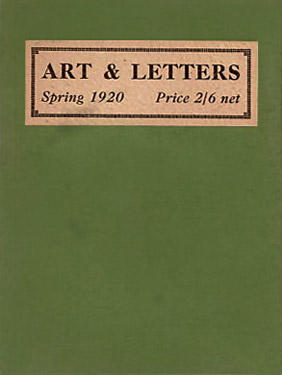
Cover of Art & Letters, Spring 1920, co-edited by Frank Rutter

Rutter, along with Harold Gilman and Charles Ginner had planned the launch of a journal, Art & Letters, for Spring 1914, but this was delayed by the outbreak of the war. It began publication in July 1917 as an illustrated quarterly, co-edited by Rutter and Herbert Read, whose aesthetic and critical ideas dominated. It was a modernist magazine of visual and literary art, which fused the artistic and the political.

The contents page of the first issue carried a policy of remuneration for contributors, based on "co-operative lines" that after the cost of production and 5% on capital, half of the profits would go to editorial and publishing staff and the other half would be split equally between contributors. Underneath an 1894 woodcut by Lucien Pissarro, page one carried an editorial explaining the delayed publication due to the outbreak of war and justifying the use of scarce materials, compared to other periodicals "which give vulgar and illiterate expression to the most vile and debasing sentiments." It was also stated that some of the contributors were serving at the front and that educated men in the army were keen to see such a publication: "Engaged, as their duty bids, on harrowing work of destruction, they exhort their elders at home never to lose sight of the supreme importance of creative art."

Sickert's "Thérèse Lassore" was printed in 1918, after which the journal ceased publication for a year. It resumed again with Osbert Sitwell as Rutter's co-editor—and T. S. Eliot's theories predominating editorially—but folded in 1920.

From 1915 to 1919, Rutter returned to the Allied Artists' Association in the guiding role of chairman. In 1917, he resigned his job at the Leeds City Art Gallery, and he worked for the Admiralty as an administrative officer (AAO) until 1919.

== 1920s and 1930s ==
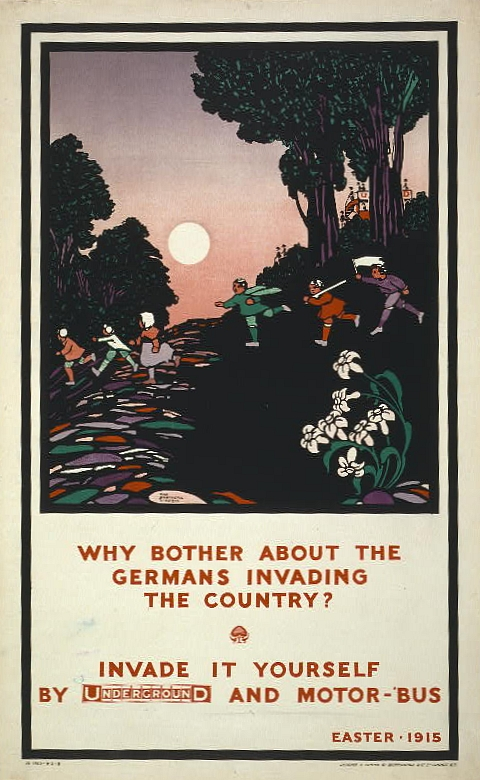
London Underground poster, 1915

After leaving the Admiralty, Rutter opened the Adelphi Gallery to exhibit small pieces by Ginner, Edward Wadsworth and David Bomberg. Finding this a restriction on his "liberty and leisure" he returned to writing and completed in the region of 20 books, as well as a considerable number of contributions to The Burlington Magazine, Apollo, Studio Magazine, The Financial Times and The Times.

In his writings he emphasised both the spiritual and social role of art. He also commented on the visual power to be found in the London Underground: "The whole nation is much less affected by what pictures are shown in the Royal Academy than by what posters are put up on the hoardings. A few thousand see the first, but the second are seen by millions. The art galleries of the People are not in Bond Street but are to be found in every railway station."

On 28 March 1920 in The Sunday Times, Rutter reviewed the short-lived Group X (a reforming of the Vorticists), "the real tendency of the exhibition is towards a new sort of realism, evolved by artists who have passed through a phase of abstract experiment.".

He divorced his wife around this time, and on 29 March 1920 married Ethel Dorothy (born 1894/5), the second daughter of William Robert Bunce, a coal merchant.

In 1927, he said of Newlyn artist Dod Procter's painting, Morning, exhibited in the Royal Academy that it was "a new vision of the human figure which amounts to the invention of a twentieth century style in portraiture" and "She has achieved apparently with consummate ease that complete presentation of twentieth century vision in terms of plastic design after which Derain and other much praised French painters have been groping for years past."

1928–1931, Rutter was European Editor of International Studio, New York. He was also the London Correspondent for the Association Française d'Expansion et d'Echanges Artistiques. In 1932, he praised advances in the Tate Gallery's attitude towards art since its foundation (although others, notably Douglas Cooper, considered it "hopelessly insular").

He suffered from a bronchial complaint for a number of years, as a result of which he periodically sojourned on the South Coast, visiting London exhibitions when he felt in good enough health to do so. In April 1937, he had an attack of bronchitis and died, aged 61, a fortnight later on 18 April in his home at 5 Litchfield Way, Golders Green, London; the funeral service was at 12.30 p.m. on 21 April at Golders Green Crematorium. He wrote his Sunday Times article up to a week before his death. He left his estate, which included around 80 paintings by the likes of Gilman, Ginner, Gore and Lucien Pissarro, to his wife. He had no children.

== Appearance and character ==
Rutter was tall with an incisive profile, an enthusiastic character and a strong manner of delivery. He was a supportive friend and good company who injected conversations with humour, for which he adopted an "uncular" manner. He was modest and generous, not motivated by personal ambition, but advancing the interests of art and artists over any profit for himself. His approach was not that of an intellectual applying logic impersonally, but through aesthetic intuition and an empathy for the creative process. His knowledge of art history sufficed for his needs, and he could be critical, but his main feature was the display of personal judgement and a preference to address the work he could enjoy.

== Books ==
- Varsity Types, 1902
- The Path to Paris, 1908
- Rossetti, Painter and Man of Letters, 1909
- Whistler, a Biography and an Estimate, 1910
- Revolution in Art, 1910
- The Wallace Collection, 1913
- Some Contemporary Artists, 1922
- The Poetry of Architecture, 1923
- Richard Wilson and Farington, 1923
- The Old Masters, 1925
- Evolution in Modern Art, 1926
- Theodore Roussel, 1927
- Since I was Twenty-Five, 1928
- El Greco, 1930
- Art in My Time, 1933
- Modern Masterpieces, 1936

== See also ==
- Leeds Arts Club
