= Elsie Duval =

British suffragette (1892–1919)

Elsie Diederichs Duval
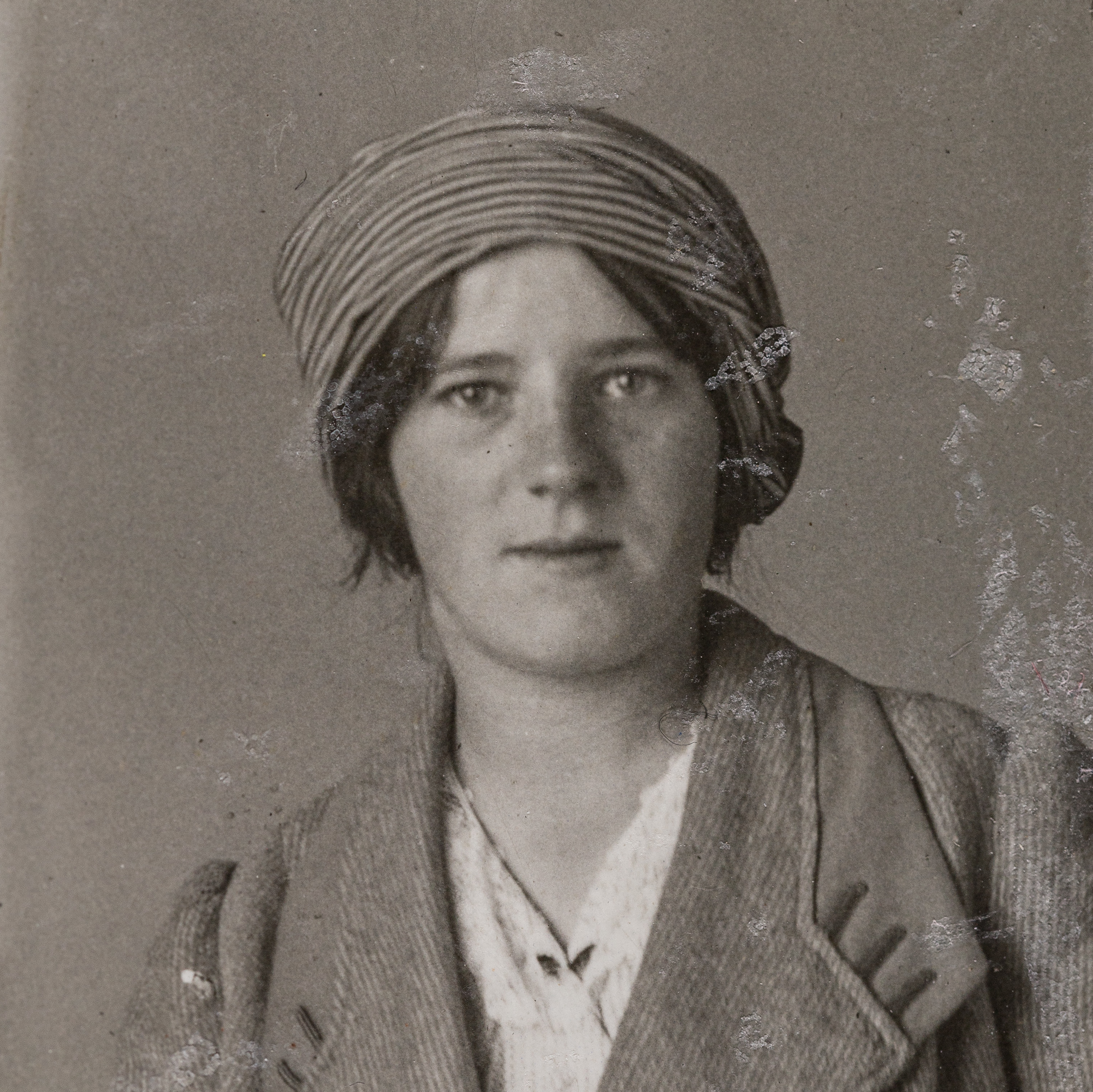
- Born: 1892
- Died: 1919 (aged 26–27)
- Other name: Eveline Dukes
- Known for: Suffragette
- Political party: Women's Party
- Movement: Women's Social and Political Union
- Spouse: Hugh Franklin (m. 1915–1919)
- Relatives: Victor Duval (brother); Una Duval (sister-in-law)

Elsie Diederichs Duval (1892–1919) was a British suffragette. She was arrested many times throughout her life and in 1913 became the first woman to be released from Holloway Prison under the so-called 'Cat and Mouse Act'. She died from heart failure on 1 January 1919 caused by septic pneumonia during the influenza epidemic.

== Early life ==
Elsie Duval was born in 1892 into a family of passionate supporters of the suffrage campaign in the United Kingdom. Between 1908 and 1912, her mother, Emily Duval (née Hayes), was arrested on six occasions.

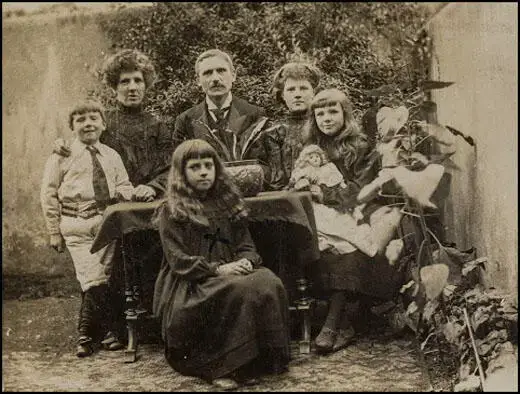
Emily Duval and her husband Ernest in about 1904 with four of their children: Gurney, Barbara, Elsie and in front Norah

She was one of six children born to Ernest and Emily Duval and her family were involved in the campaign for women's voting rights. Elsie herself became involved in the movement when she signed up to the Woman's Social and Political Union (WSPU) in 1907, although she was too young to partake in any militant action herself.

Over the following three years, she became involved with the Men’s Political Union for Women’s Enfranchisement, which had been founded by her brother Victor Duval, and where she grew closer to her future husband Hugh Franklin.

== Activism ==
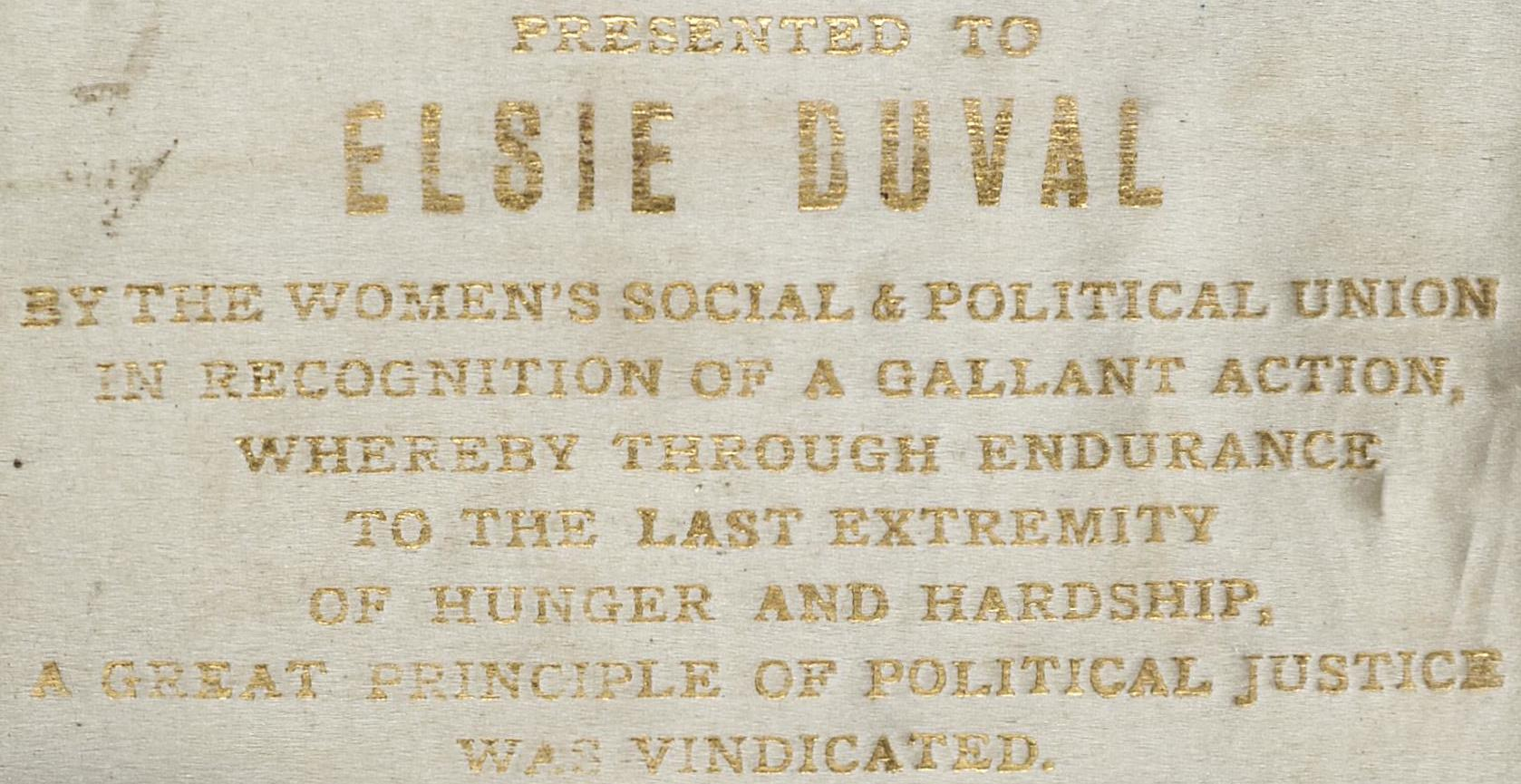
Elsie Duval's hunger strike medal presentation text in 1912

At first Elsie was not allowed to partake in militant activism but on 23 November 1911 she was arrested for the first time after she was charged with obstructing the police. This was after the tenth 'Women's Parliament' was called to Claxton Hall, this was where at the start of each Parliament the WSPU would march to the House of Commons and try to deliver a petition to the Prime Minister. However, Elsie was not the only member of the Duval family to be arrested as her mother, two of her sisters, and brother Victor were also charged. After she was discharged she swiftly put herself forward to be involved in the next WSPU militant protest, and was accepted.

In July 1912, Elsie broke a window in Clapham Post Office and was sentenced to serve one month in Holloway prison, her first of a few sentences served there. While she was reprimanded Elsie said they wanted her "state of mind to be inquired into". She was released on 3 August but during her sentence she was force-fed on nine separate occasions. Duval had been given a Hunger Strike Medal 'for Valour' by WSPU.

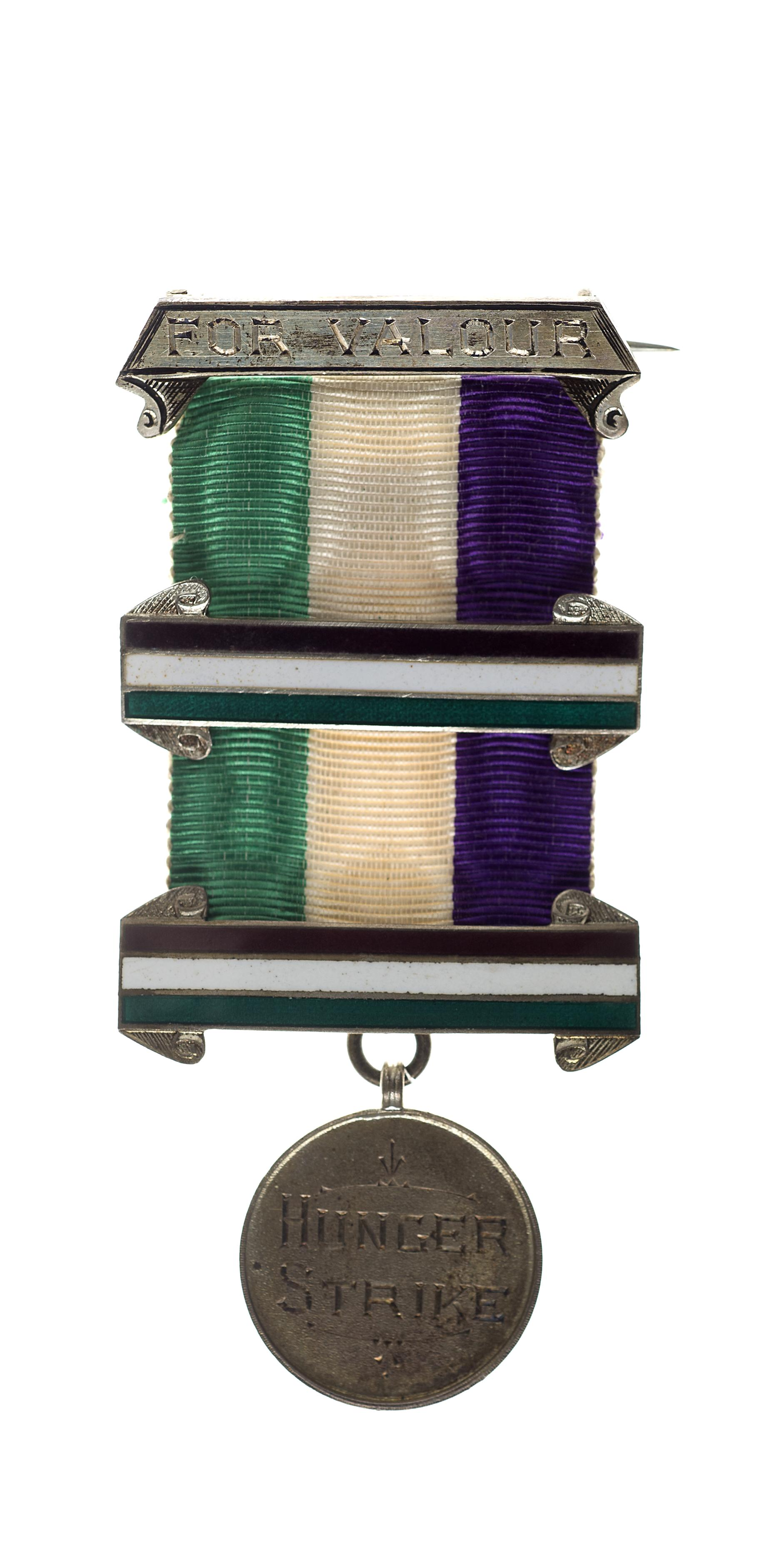
The medal awarded to Elsie following her prison hunger strike

Only a few months later, on 3 April 1913, she was arrested alongside Phyllis Brady (whose real name was Olive Beamish), for 'loitering with intent'. The pair were both carrying leather cases which they accounted for by claiming they had recently returned from a holiday but when pursued by the police they dropped the cases, which were found to have inflammable material inside. This was obviously intended to start a fire in the Croydon area where they were arrested. Both were kept in custody and then sentenced to six weeks imprisonment in Holloway. While there the pair were repeatedly force-fed and Elsie received a hunger strike medal from the WSPU.

While in prison Elsie kept a diary on six sheets of brown toilet paper on which she wrote with a blue pencil. One day after being force-fed she wrote: 'Sunday: After big struggle fed me through throat- pain at heart after- Doctor came back examined me and tried to make me take medicine and after put to bed by my wardresses'. While the pair were in Holloway the 'Cat and Mouse Act' was passed to try and prevent those who were becoming extremely ill from malnutrition from dying. Elsie became the first female released under the act and was supposed to be free for just fourteen days but did not come back to Holloway. Hugh warned Elsie that a case was being built against both 'Phyllis' and herself relating to accusations of setting Lady White's house, Trevethan house in Englefield Green, on fire. The fire resulted in an approximate £3,000 of damage. As well as this the pair were thought to have been involved in other fires such as that at Sanderstead station. Elsie eventually fled the country to Europe.

== Life in Europe ==
In Europe, Elsie went under the alias Eveline Dukes and had many fake references allowing her to get employed in various countries. Using the character references she had (all provided by people who knew her such as her brother Victor - who was married to fellow activist Una Dugdale) she got a job in Germany as a governess for 10 months. She then spent three months in Brussels learning French and doing office work, followed by two months in Switzerland.

At first she believed she would be able to travel with Hugh but actress-director and fellow activist Winifred Mayo warned against this. In March 1914, during her time abroad, she received a letter from Jessie Kenney (writing under the alias C. Burrows) which said: 'Miss Pankhurst thinks it would be better for you to stay where you are for the time being and until you get stronger'. But when World War One began in 1914, she returned to the UK after a general amnesty was granted to the suffragettes.

== Personal life and marriage ==
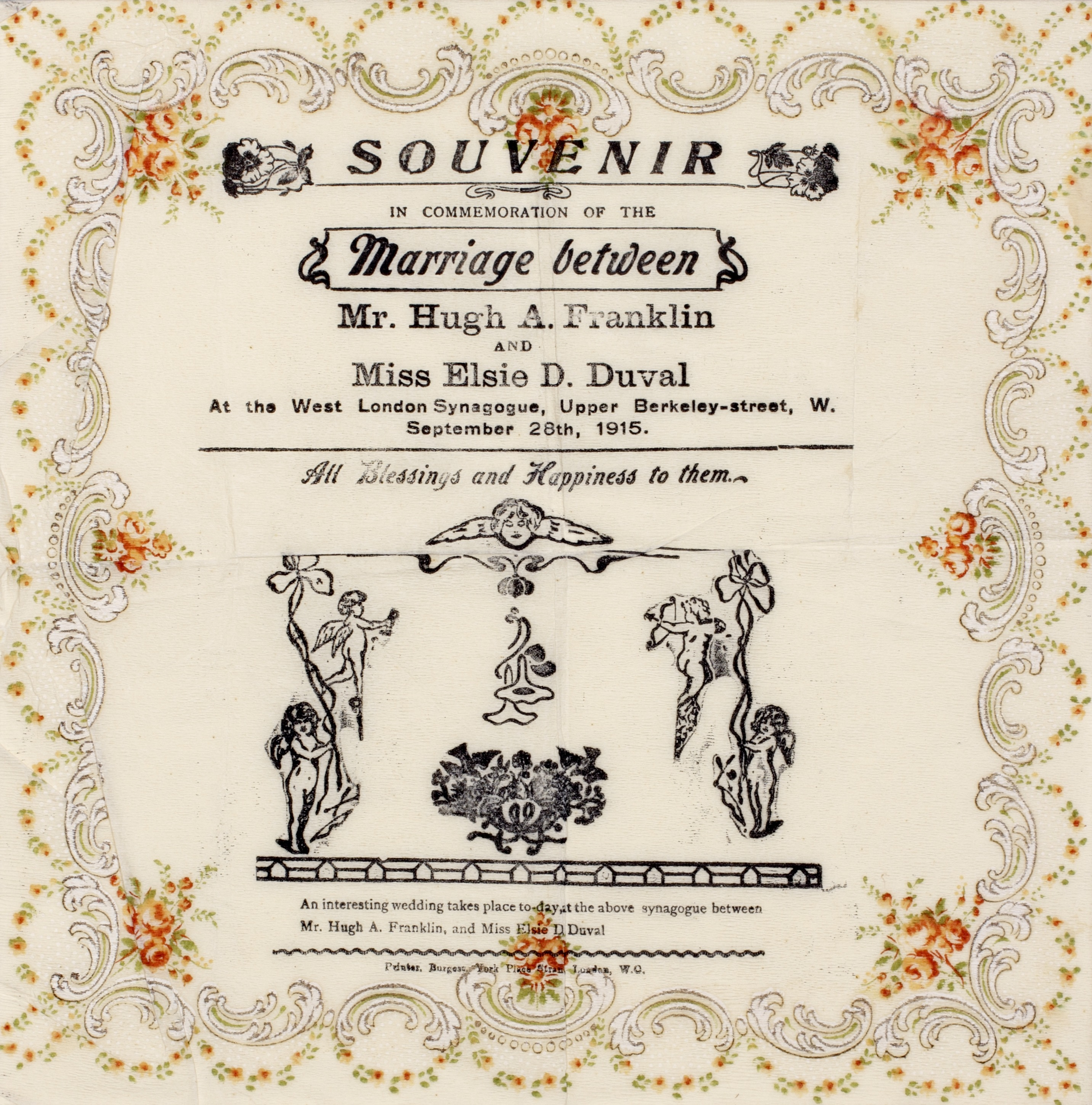
Souvenir napkin celebrating Hugh and Elsie's marriage

Elsie became engaged to Hugh in March 1913 and blamed the 'Cat and Mouse Act' for their disrupted love life saying: "the Cat and Mouse Act rendered our plans too unsettled to marry". And although they escaped to France together they travelled separately through Europe. When she returned in 1914 she became involved in politics again, giving Sylvia Pankhurst a blue velvet cap that Christmas, and supporting the WSPU over the course of the following years, but she also found more time for her romantic life. In June 1915, she invited Emmeline Pankhurst to be a witness at her wedding but Pankhurst replied saying that she would be away at the end of July and all of August. Elsie and Hugh eventually got married at West London Synagogue on 28 September 1915 but their marriage was short-lived as she died three years later.

== Final years ==
In 1917, Elsie joined the new Women's Party which was formed by Christabel and Emmeline Pankhurst after they had dissolved WSUP. She continued to campaign for a women's right to vote and eventually in 1918 the Representation of the People Act was passed and some women were given the right to vote for the first time. In 1919, Elsie died aged 26 partly due to her experience of force-feeding in prison but also because of heart problems caused by septic pneumonia which she contracted during the 1918 influenza epidemic. In her last letter to Hugh she wrote "my heart is like a steam engine"; it is believed that her force-feedings had severely impacted her health.
