= H. J. Gillespie =

Hugh James Gillespie (1881 – 6 January 1950) was a British socialist activist who was also prominent in the women's suffrage movement.

Gillespie was educated at Wellington College and the Royal Military Academy, Woolwich. He then joined the Royal Field Artillery and served in India.

Gillespie joined the Fabian Society in 1911 and soon came to prominence, serving as honorary secretary of its Research Department in 1913. That year, he was also elected to the executives of the Men’s Political Union for Women’s Enfranchisement and the Railway Nationalisation Society. He was a founder member of the United Suffragists, along with Agnes Harben and her husband, serving as its treasurer in 1914. Gillespie rejoined the Royal Field Artillery to fight in the First World War, rising to become a major, and receiving the Distinguished Service Order.

Gillespie was still supportive of the labour movement immediately after the war, writing a testimonial for the Daily Herald, but he later drifted away, and wrote a book, Why I Gave Up Socialism.

From 1923, Gillespie undertook publicity work for the Mining Association of Great Britain. He rejoined the army during World War II, and was placed in charge of the administrative battery of the 124 Officer Cade Training Unit in Radnorshire, before being seconded to the Foreign Office. In 1943 he began working full time for the Mining Association, and he was appointed as the organisation's secretary in 1946.
