= Victor Duval =

British suffrage activist (1885–1945)

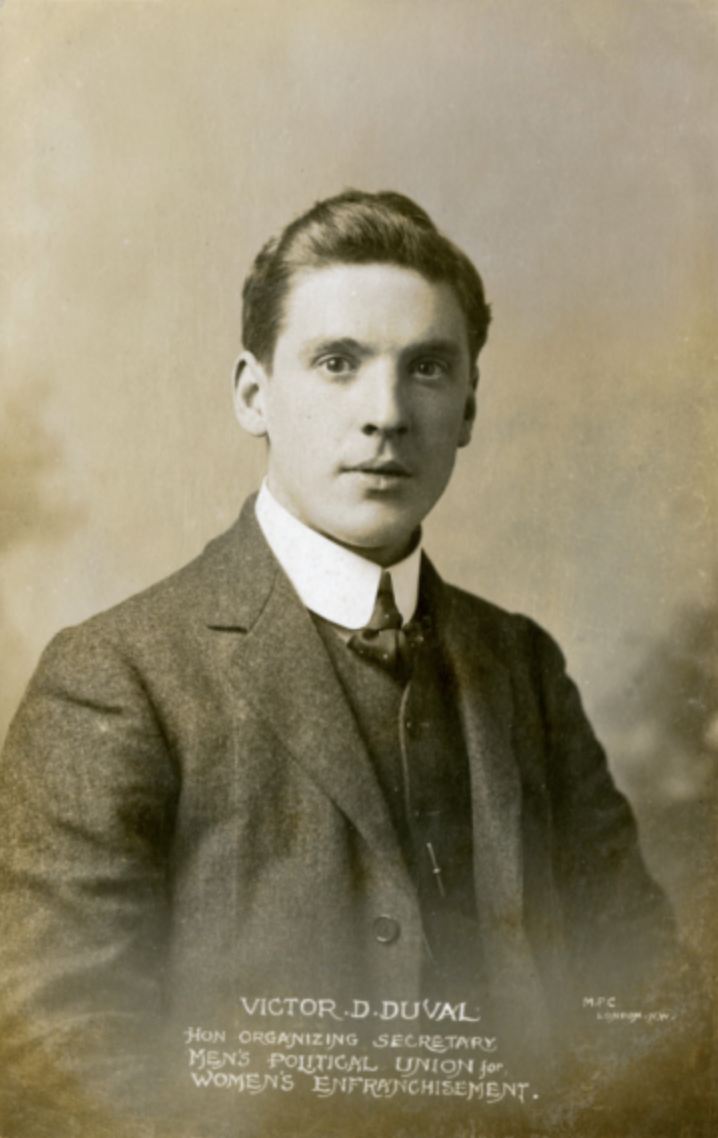
- "An Appeal to Men"
- Born: 16 March 1885; Wandsworth, London, England
- Died: 4 October 1945 (aged 61); Lancashire, England
- Known for: Suffragist
- Spouse: Una Duval (m. 1912)
- Children: 2
- Parent: Emily Duval
- Relatives: Elsie Duval (sister); Hugh Franklin MP (brother-in-law)

Victor Diederichs Duval (1885–1945) was a British suffragist and political activist. He is best known for founding the Men’s Political Union for Women’s Enfranchisement (MPU) in 1910. He was imprisoned for suffrage-related activism and later returned to electoral politics as an unsuccessful Liberal parliamentary candidate in the 1920s.

== Early life ==
Duval was the son of Emily Hayes and Ernest Charles Augustus Diederichs Duval, a German immigrant of potentially Jewish background. His mother and maternal aunt are both recorded as having been members of the Jewish League for Woman Suffrage. Duval came from a middle class family, all of whom supported votes for women.

His parents, as well his siblings, were fellow suffragists. Most notably his sister Elsie Duval, who was the second person to be released under the Prisoners (Temporary Discharge for Ill Health) Act 1913 (the so-called "Cat and Mouse law"), and was married to fellow suffrage campaigner Hugh Franklin.

== Activism ==
=== Liberals ===
Before entering the suffrage movement, Duval served as secretary of the Clapham League of Young Liberals. When the Liberal government refused to recognise women's right to vote, Duval resigned the party in protest."

After witnessing a woman being shovingly ejected from a Liberal gathering, he said: "The men who identify as liberals make me ashamed. They have insulted women, pulled the liberal flag into the street, and trampled on it, and for that I am ashamed of them."

Duval rejoined after women in the UK were granted the right to vote.

=== MPU ===
The Men's Political Union for Women's Enfranchisement (MPU) was established in 1910 by Victor Duval for men who wished to support the Women's Social and Political Union (WSPU) but were unable to do so because of their sex. The MPU was non-partisan and welcomed members who shared its core values to "obtain for women the parliamentary vote on the same terms as it is or may be granted to males" regardless of their political beliefs.

When suffragette activism became more militant and women were more likely to be physically assaulted and arrested, the MPU operated as an unofficial bodyguard to protect them, putting its members at risk of serious injury, assault, and imprisonment.

Prior to this, Duval had been a committed supporter of the Women's Social and Political Union as well as the Women's Freedom League, both of which his family still supported.

=== Arrests and imprisonments ===
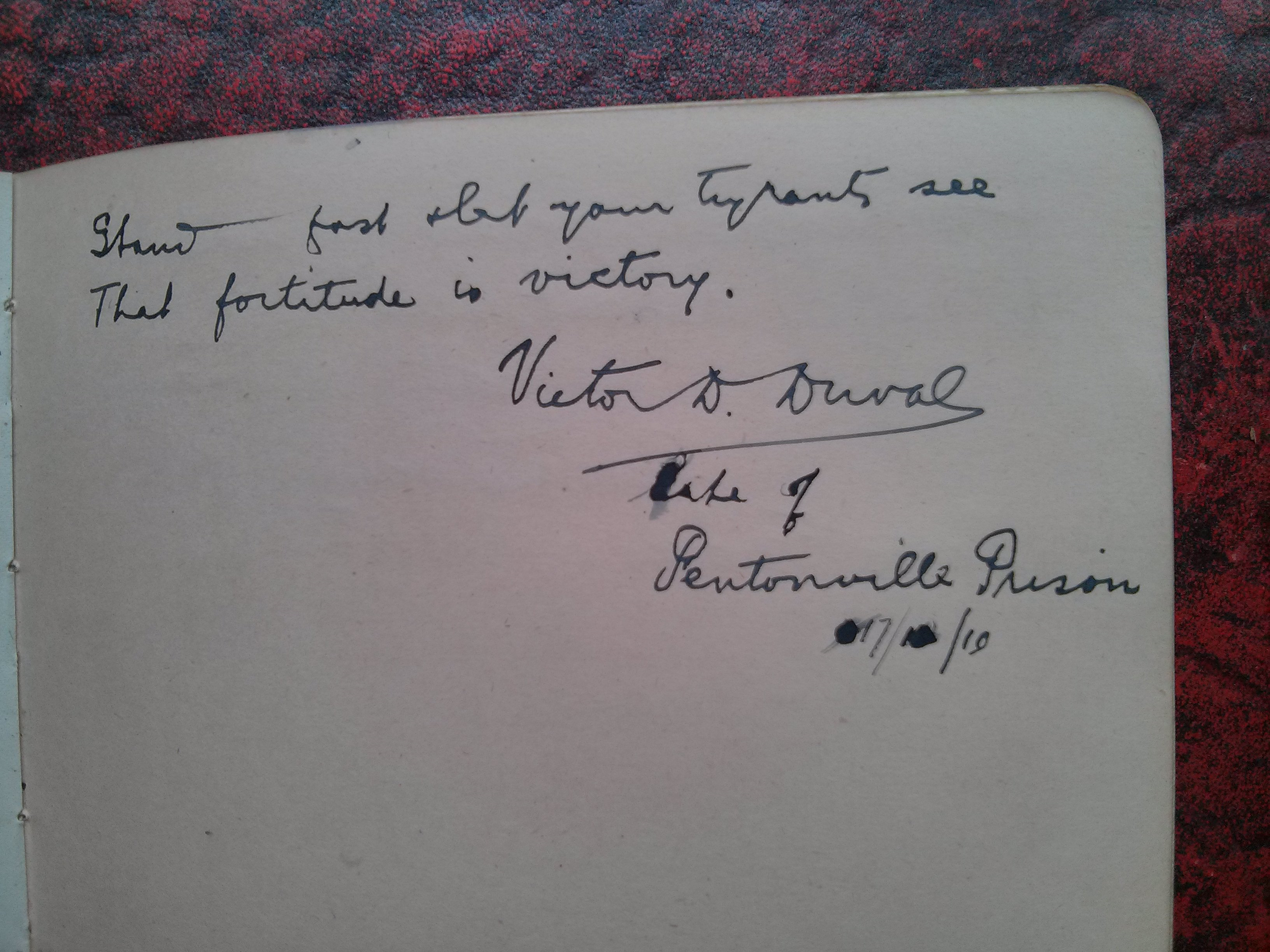
Entry by Victor Duval in Mabel Cappers WSPU prisoners scrapbook October 1910

Duval was involved in militant suffrage activity before and after the MPU's foundation. Duval was arrested and imprisoned at least three times for women's suffrage. In July 1909, Duval was charged with “Aiding and abetting Marion Wallace Dunlop, in wilful and malicious damage to the stone work of St. Stephen’s Hall, House of Commons, by stamping it with an indelible rubber stamp, to the value of ten shillings.” Duval went to prison again in 1910 after disrupting a meeting attended by David Lloyd George. In 1911 Duval was jailed again for five days for his activism.

=== Publications ===
Duval published a leaflet titled "An Appeal to Men" in 1910 to persuade men to take up the militant struggle for women's suffrage.

Duval later published Why I Went to Prison as a political pamphlet in response to his detentions and arrests.

== Marriage controversy ==
Before she married Duval in 1912, Suffragette Una Dugdale (1885–1945) caused a national uproar by announcing she would not include the term "obey" in her wedding vows, but she changed her mind after learning this could cast doubt on the legality of the marriage. The wedding took place at Savoy Chapel. Dame Christabel Pankhurst, Lady Constance Lytton, and the Pethick-Lawrences wore WSPU colours at the wedding. The couple had two daughters.

After 1918, Duval continued to campaign for equality and marriage reform.

== First World War ==
The surviving readily accessible evidence for Duval's wartime experience is limited. Later biographical summaries state that, although he was critical of the wartime turn taken by parts of the suffrage movement, he subsequently served with the Royal Engineers at Salonika during the First World War. His military service later formed part of his post-war public identity: modern scholarship on interwar Liberal politics includes Duval among the party's ex-servicemen candidates of the 1920s.

== Later political career ==
Women's Suffrage Resources states that Duval stood unsuccessfully as a Liberal candidate at three elections in the 1920s. In the 1924 United Kingdom general election, he contested Camberwell North as the Liberal candidate and received 1,729 votes. Modern scholarship has also identified him as the Liberal candidate for South West Norfolk in 1929.

== Death and legacy ==
Duval died in 1945. He is chiefly remembered as the founder of the MPU and as one of the male supporters of women's suffrage sometimes described as the "suffragettes in trousers".
