= Emily Duval =

British suffragette

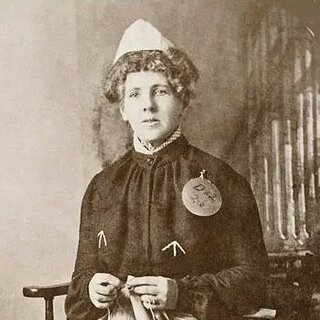
- Born: 25 November 1860; Mayfair, London, England
- Died: 31 October 1924 (aged 63); Battersea, London, England
- Organisation(s): Women's Social and Political Union; Women's Freedom League
- Children: Victor Duval, Elsie Duval

Emily Duval (née Hayes; 25 November 1860 – 31 October 1924) was a British suffragette. She twice joined the Women's Social and Political Union (WSPU) and she was a member of the Women's Freedom League (WFL). She served several terms of imprisonment and her family members were also suffragettes.

== Life ==
Duval was born in Mayfair in 1860. Her parents were Jane and Thomas Hayes. One source says her father was a coachman while another says that he managed a factory.

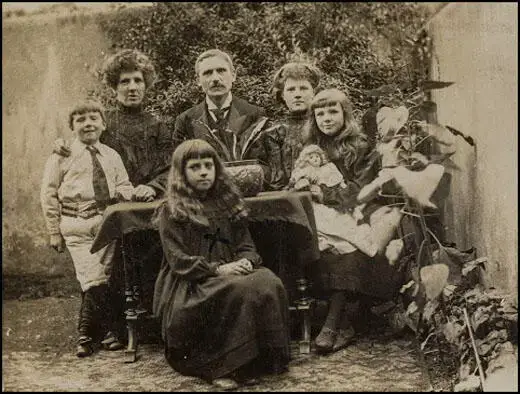
Emily and her husband Ernest in about 1904 with four of their children: Gurney, Barbara, Elsie and in front Norah

She joined the Women's Social and Political Union (WSPU) in 1906, but she left the following year to join the more democratic Women's Freedom League (WFL). She was the chair of the WFL group in Battersea.

In 1907 she was disrupting court cases where a woman was being tried for an offence. The WFL argued that the woman had not been a party to the creation of the law because she was not represented in parliament. Therefore the court was acting outside of the rule of law.

She was arrested in 1908 together with her daughter Barbara during the Grille Incident at the Palace of Westminster. They had both been with Muriel Matters when she chained herself to the grills that divided the public viewing section of the House of Commons. Emily paid her fine and 17 year old Barbara was released after she said that she would not get involved in any further protests until she was 21 (i.e. an adult). Muriel Matters and Duval were given an imprisonment badge by Charlotte Despard of the WFL. This sculpted Holloway or Portcullis pin, made in silver, was engraved on the back with their names and this badge predated the more well known WSPU badge.

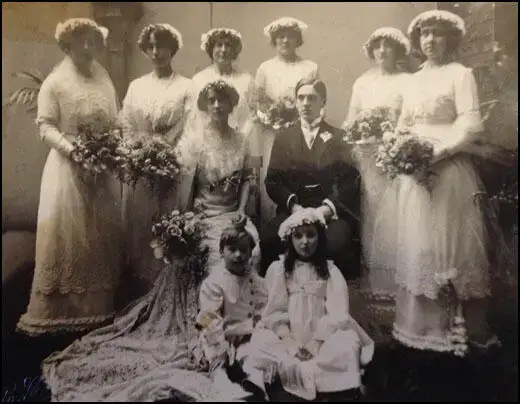
Suffragette wedding: Una Dugdale and her son Victor Duval at their wedding on 13 January 1912

Between 1908 and 1912 she was arrested on six occasions. She served six weeks at one time with Constance Lytton in 1909. In 1910 her son Victor Duval founded the Men's Political Union for Women's Enfranchisement (MPU). In the following year she became disillusioned with the WFL and she rejoined the WSPU. She soon broke some windows and once arrested she broke some more. That got her two weeks in prison. In 1912 she was four months into a six-month sentence in Birmingham's Winson Green prison when she decided to hunger-strike. She was force fed and then released to a nursing home.

In 1913 her daughter Elsie Duval became the first woman to be released from Holloway Prison under the so-called 'Cat and Mouse Act'. Elsie married another suffragette and died in 1919. Duval herself died in 1924 in Battersea, London.

== See also ==
- The Grille Incident
- Women's Freedom League
