= Ethel Wright (painter) =

British portrait painter, illustrator and model

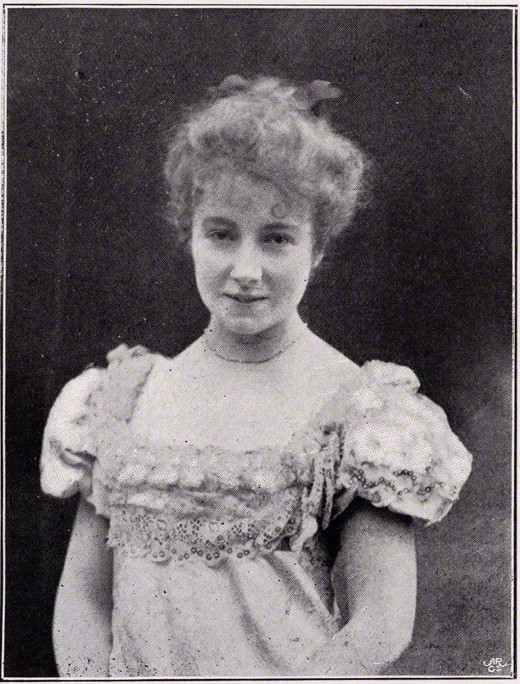
- Portrait of Ethel Wright by Hayman Seleg Mendelssohn
- Born: c. 1866; London, England
- Died: 1939 (aged 72–73)
- Education: Académie Julian, Paris
- Occupation: Painter
- Known for: Portraiture
- Spouse: Mr Bradley

Ethel Wright later Ethel Bradley (c. 1866 – 1939) was a British portrait painter, illustrator and model. Wright has several paintings in British national collections and her most famous work is a portrait of the suffragette leader Christabel Pankhurst, which is in the National Portrait Gallery.

== Work ==
Wright was born in between 1866 and 1869 in London. Her father was called John Wright. She sketched and copied paintings in the National Gallery and she became a student of John Seymour Lucas.

She later studied at the Académie Julian in Paris with the support and on the advice of renowned portraitist Solomon Joseph Solomon On her return he exhibited a painting in 1888 that he had made of her. Wright also sat for Arthur Hacker featuring in perhaps 50 of his paintings. By the late 19th century she was regularly exhibiting as a society portraitist at The Royal Academy and achieved a profile as a painter in the 1890s identified in the modernist Rhythm Group.

She was also known for painting Pierrot which was exhibited at the Royal Academy of Arts in 1892 and bought by Oldham Art Gallery.

Following three years of living with her husband she went to America in 1901 where she successfully found work as an illustrator. She noted that American illustration was more advanced however American paintings were not so well. She returned in 1905 and briefly tried to reclaim her marriage.

== Suffragette Portraits ==
Having achieved some recognition as a society portraitist, Wright became increasingly political as did her portraits. Wright became a supporter of the suffragettes. In 1909 Wright painted her most famous portrait, that of Christabel Pankhurst.

Her full length portrait of Christabel Pankhurst was exhibited at "The Women's Exhibition", hosted by the WSPU, funded by Clara Mordan and held at the Prince's Ice Rink in Knightsbridge in May 1909. Suffragette and marriage reformer, Una Duval, bought the painting and it remained in the family until being bequeathed by a descendent of the Duvals to the National Portrait Gallery in 2011, it was first exhibited by them in 2018.

In 1912, Wright also painted a full length portrait of Una Dugdale dressed in bright jade with a background of fierce fighting cocks, entitled "The Music Room". This painting was first shown in London's Stafford Gallery in the same year and was exhibited as recently as 2020 at the Pallant House Gallery, Chichester and in 2024 in Now You See Us: Women Artists in Britain, 1520-1920 at Tate Britain, 16 May-13 October 2024. Ethel Wright was also responsible for the portrait which was featured on Una Duval's marriage reform pamphlet "Love, Honour and not Obey".

She continued to support the suffragettes until 1927 and the Representation of the People (Equal Franchise) Act 1928 gave women electoral equality with men.

== Other work ==
In about 1915 she painted Beatrice, Lady Lever. She would become a hero of the Royal Free Hospital after she died as a result of volunteering as a nurse during World War One.

== Legacy ==
Her painting of Christabel Pankhurst was donated by Una Duval's descendant to the National Portrait Gallery in 2011. It was exhibited in 2018 when it was noted that the gallery had previously only had pictures of suffragettes taken by the police as suspicious characters.

She achieved success as a painter but she was identified as a great woman artist.

== Personal life ==
She was "also known as Mrs Bradley". She had married Bernard Armiger Barczinsky in 1897 in Liverpool. He was a theatrical producer and Wright later claimed that he had misrepresented himself. He changed his name to Barclay during the time they were together. He left her in 1900, she tried to reclaim the marriage but she divorced him in 1910.

Wright died in 1939.
