= Beatrice Falk =

UK nurse (1873–1917)

Beatrice, Lady Lever
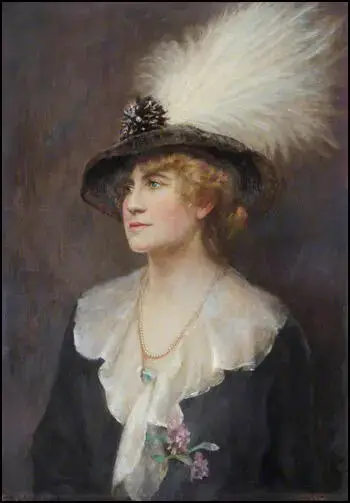
- by Ethel Wright c. 1915
- Born: Beatrice Hilda Falk; 3 November 1873; Salford
- Died: 28 May 1917 (aged 43)
- Other name: "Lady (Arthur) Lever"
- Occupation: Voluntary Aid Detachment nurse
- Known for: died serving her country
- Children: Tresham Joseph Philip Lever

Beatrice Hilda Falk became Beatrice Hilda Levy and Lady (Arthur) Lever (3 November 1873 – 28 May 1917) was a titled UK nurse. Her premature death working as a volunteer nurse led to a memorial window in York Minster.

== Life ==
Falk was born in Salford on 3 November 1873. She was one of the six children of Philip and Sarah Falk. In 1896 she married Sir Arthur Levy who was a baronet and a politician with the Liberal Party. He had been born in Leicester and he was thirteen years older than her. They made their home in Knightsbridge. Some time before the war she wrote a play titled "Brown Sugar".

In 1914 the First World War started and her husband re-joined the army. He was a major in the Royal Fusiliers' 2/1st Battalion London Regiment and in time he would become a Colonel. In about 1915 she had her portrait painted by the suffragist artist Ethel Wright.

Her husband changed his and her name to Lever.

Women were encouraged to volunteer to help the war effort and Falk decided to become a VAD nurse.

== Death and legacy ==
In 1917 she was working as a nurse in Hampstead General Hospital (in what was then the "Royal Free Military Hospital for officers") when she contracted sepsis from the patients she was caring for. She died on 28 May. She was buried in the Golders Green Jewish Cemetery.

The Imperial War Museum has a retouched photo of her as a "titled volunteer" in her nurses uniform noting that she "died in the service of her country". Her family paid for a memorial window in York Minster and her play "Brown Sugar" was published with the author named as "Lady (Arthur) Lever". The play was performed in 1922 and 1931.

Her portrait which is in the Royal Free Hospital's collection, was hosted on the ArtUK website. It was thought to be by an unknown artist. Investigations revealed that it was by the suffragist artist Ethel Wright.
