= The Men's Political Union for Women's Enfranchisement =

- Men's Political Union for Women's Enfranchisement (MPU)
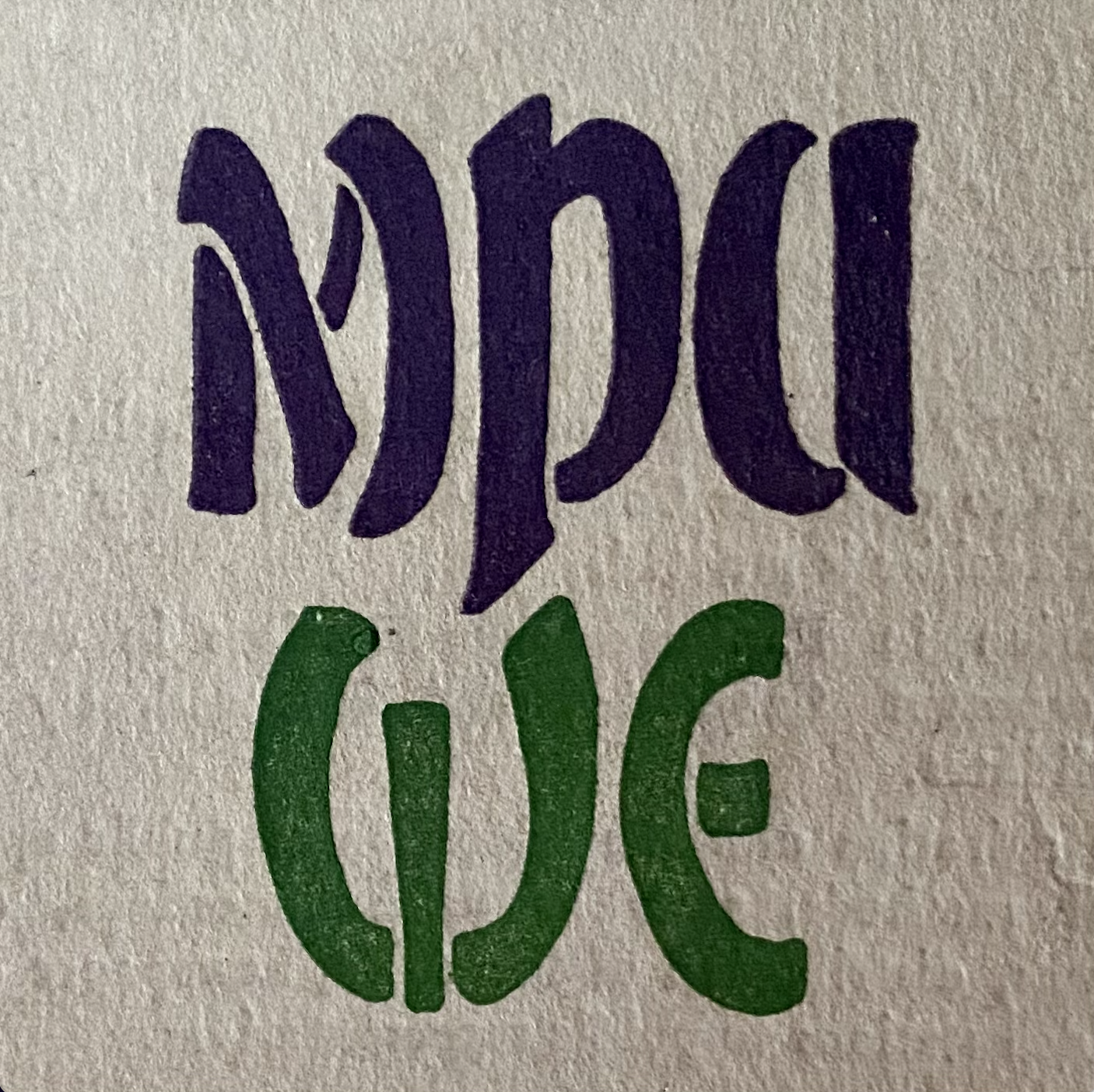
- Men’s Political Union for Women’s Enfranchisement logo, 1910
- Formation: 13 January 1910
- Founders: Victor Duval et al (UK)
- Location: 13, Buckingham Street, Strand, WC London

The Men's Political Union for Women's Enfranchisement (MPU) was a political society founded on 13 January 1910 in the Eustace Miles Restaurant in London as part of the women's suffrage movement in the United Kingdom.

The MPU had branches across the United Kingdom.

== History ==
Men who wished to support The Women's Social and Political Union (WSPU) but were unable to join due to their sex established The Men's Political Union for Women's Enfranchisement (MPU) in 1910. The MPU sometimes undertook militant actions themselves and has been described as "one of the most militant men’s support groups" of the women's suffrage movement.

Regardless of their other personal political views, the MPU welcomed members who shared its core value: for women to obtain the same right to vote as men.

== Activities ==
As the militant struggle for women' rights to vote became more violent, WSPU members became more likely to suffer assault and arrest. The MPU acted as an unofficial bodyguard during WSPU campaigning to try and protect them from bodily harm, putting MPU members at serious risk of injury and imprisonment. When in prison, they also took part in hunger strikes for the cause.

On 17 July 1909, members of the MPU sought justice for women who were prevented from attending meetings. In reaction, they were assaulted.

The MPU and the Men's League for Women's Suffrage held a joint meeting in Hyde Park on 17 July 1910, to support the Conciliation Bill.

On 17 October 1910, Mr. Victor Duval, secretary of the MPU, was arrested for grasping Mr. Lloyd George's coat as he entered the City Temple to give a speech, and criticized him for opposing the Women's Bill. When an older man, George Jacobs, saw the police abuse of Duval, he yelled, "Don't hurt him!" Both men were imprisoned for a week as a result.

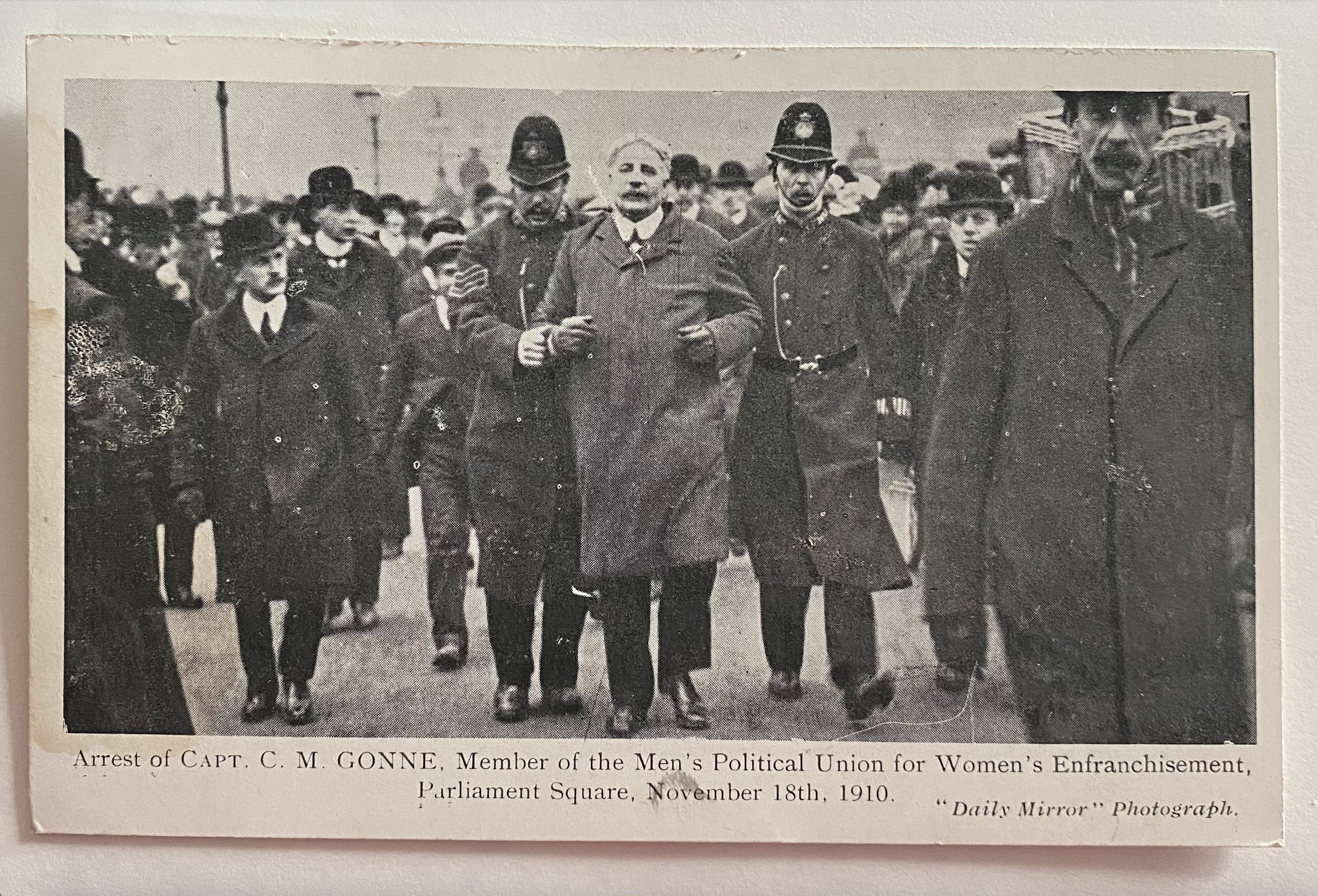
Arrest of Captain Charles Melvill Gonne, Suffragist & MPU member on Black Friday, 18 November 1910. Daily Mirror.

300 suffragettes marched to the House of Commons on 18 November 1910, to protest the rejection of the first Conciliation Bill. Captain Charles Melvill Gonne, a 48-year-old MPU member, intervened when a woman was being forcibly arrested by police and stated, 'You may take me, but you shall not take her.' A photograph of him being gripped by both arms and walked by police was then published in the Daily Mirror and later published as a Suffragist propaganda postcard for the cause.

In 1913, it was argued in the House of Commons in the British Parliament that MPU meetings were becoming so large that they were having to be broken up by the police.

In 1914, the MPU organised a 'Suffrage Speakers Defence Core' to safeguard WSPU speakers from public assaults and police arrest.

At a Limehouse meeting, an MPU member climbed a pillar to reveal a suffragette flag above the heads of two Cabinet Ministers.

== Notable members ==
- Victor Duval, Hon. Organising Secretary and founder
- Henry Nevinson (Chairman 1911–?)
- Hugh Franklin, MP (Hon. Assistant Organiser 1910)
- Frank Rutter (Hon. Treasurer 1910–1911)
- Henry Devenish Harben (Hon. Treasurer 1912–?)
- H. J. Gillespie (Hon. Literature Secretary 1912–?)

== See also ==
- Women's Social and Political Union
- Women's suffrage
- Men's League for Women's Suffrage
