= The Entrance to Trouville Harbour =

Painting by Eugène Boudin

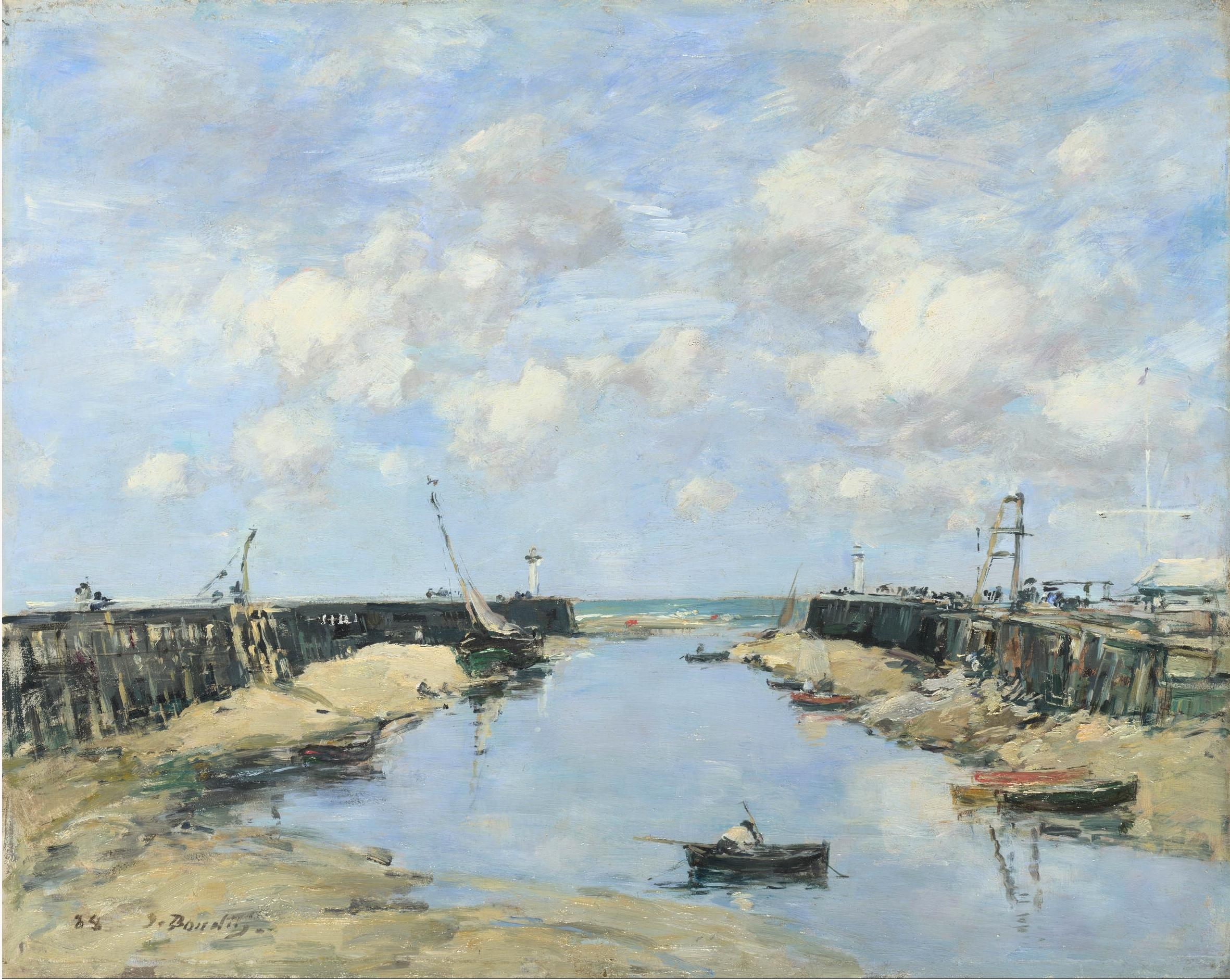
- Artist: Eugène Boudin
- Year: 1888
- Type: Oil on wood, landscape painting
- Dimensions: 32.4 cm × 40.9 cm (12.8 in × 16.1 in)
- Location: National Gallery, London

The Entrance to Trouville Harbour (French: L'entrée du port de Trouville) is an 1888 landscape painting by the French artist Eugène Boudin. It features a view of the harbour of the Normandy port of Trouville-sur-Mer. While Boudin was best known for his depictions of holidaymakers on the beaches of the town, this shows the Port of Trouville-sur-Mer where the River Touques meets the English Channel with two jetties on either side.

Boudin was born in Le Havre and much of his work focused on the coast of his native Normandy. He was an important early influence on Claude Monet. The painting was acquired by the National Gallery in London through the assistance of the Art Fund in 1906. The campaign to raise the £160 price was led by Frank Rutter through a public campaign, but the National Gallery took some persuading to accept it as it was still reluctant to displayed French Impressionism.

== See also ==
- List of paintings by Eugène Boudin

== Bibliography ==
- Dombrowski, André (ed.) A Companion to Impressionism. Wiley Blackwell, 2021.
- Taylor, Brandon. Art for the Nation: Exhibitions and the London Public, 1747-2001. Manchester University Press, 1999.
