= Port of Trouville-sur-Mer =

Harbour of Trouville-sur-Mer, France

Coordinates: 49°21′45″N 0°4′50″E

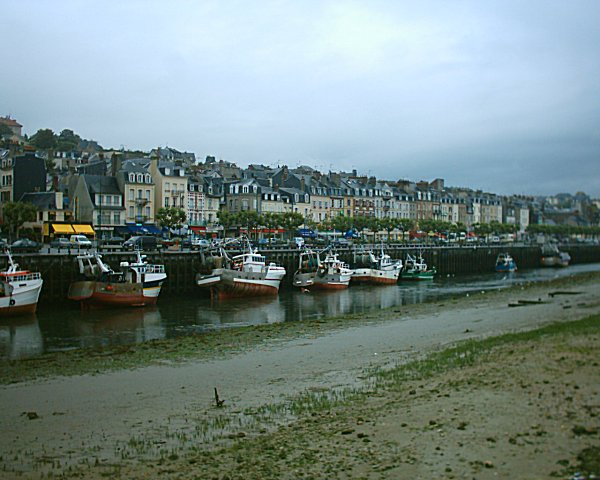
Port of Trouville-sur-Mer.

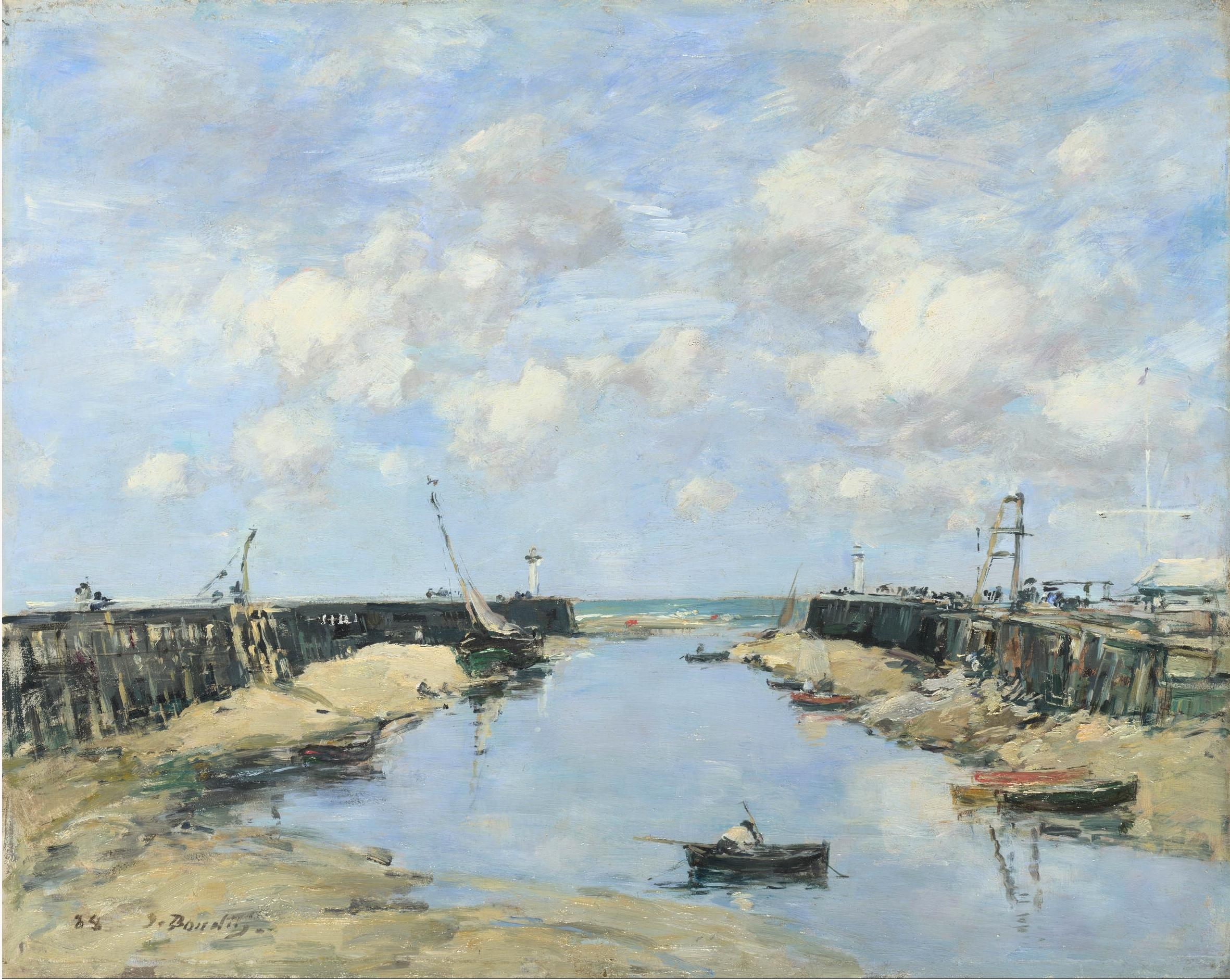
The Entrance to Trouville Harbour by Eugène Boudin, 1888

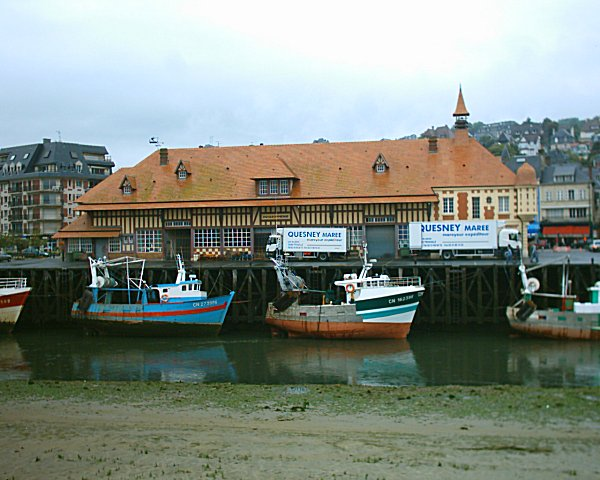
Fish market.

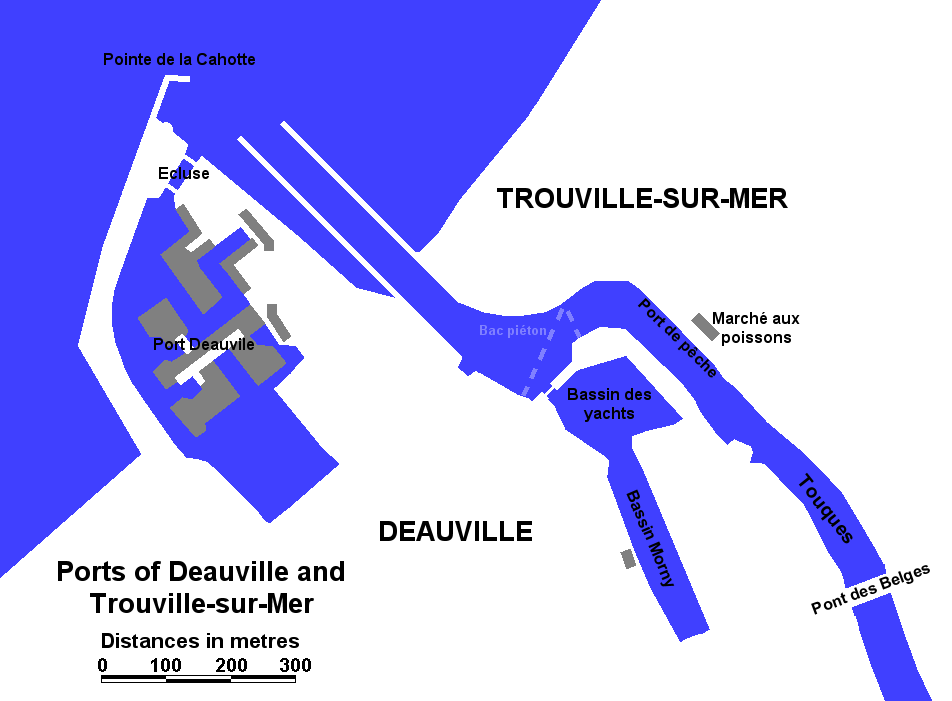
Ports of Deauvile.

The Port of Trouville-sur-Mer is the harbour of the city of Trouville-sur-Mer, France. The large town's position on the estuary of the River Touques was a natural establishment of a fish dock.

The docks of Trouville constitute a district within the city. It is situated on the River Touques, along the Boulevard Fernand Moureaux and downstream from the Pont des Belges. The main building on the docks is the fish market (marché aux poissons).

In 1934, mayor Fernand Moureaux, desiring to emphasise the traditional character of Trouville, as opposed to Deauville's grand chic hired local architect Eugène-Maurice Vincent to build, in 1936, a modern building inspired by the Lieutenance house and the porch of Saint Catherine's church of Honfleur. Due to its significance as an example of 20th-century Norman architecture, it was placed on the Protected Heritage list by the French Institute of Architecture in 1992.

== Shipwreck ==
On 23 October 1992, fishing trawler the Laiss'dire shipwrecked one nautical mile from the entrance to the port of Trouville-sur-Mer.

Due to bad weather, the search for the bodies of the ships' three sailors was in vain. The ship was run ashore two weeks later and left on the beach. No bodies were found aboard, but the bodies of two men were seen floating in the river and were fished out near Villers-sur-Mer the same day. The body of the third sailor was found in early December near Le Havre. The ship was left there as a curiosity and was taken into port a month and a half later.

== See also ==
- Port of Deauville
- Trouville-sur-Mer
