= Port of Deauville =

Coordinates: 49°21′50″N 0°4′20″E

The Port of Deauville is the harbour of the town of Deauville, France.

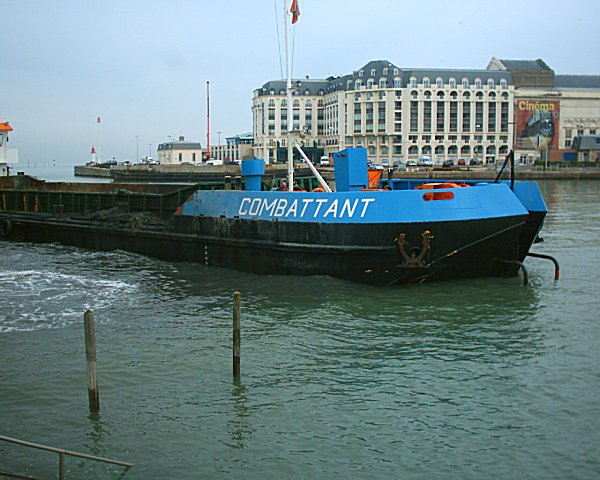
Dredging the Touques outside Port Morny.

The large town's position on the estuary of the River Touques was ideal for the establishment of a constructed harbour to supplement the fishing docks of Trouville-sur-Mer.

== Port Morny ==
There are two harbours, the oldest is the Port Morny, situated 500 m upstream the Touques and kept level with a lock. The first dock was opened in 1855, enlarged 11 years later and named the Bassin Morny, inaugurated in 1866 by Emperess Eugénie. The avant-port basin, Bassin des Yachts, was built in 1890.

In 1968, hydraulic doors were fitted to keep the basins full, even at low tide. These automated in 1989 and replaced in 2005.

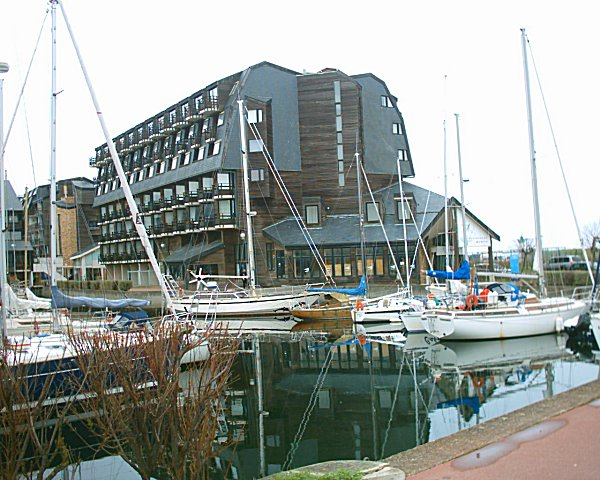
Port Deauville.

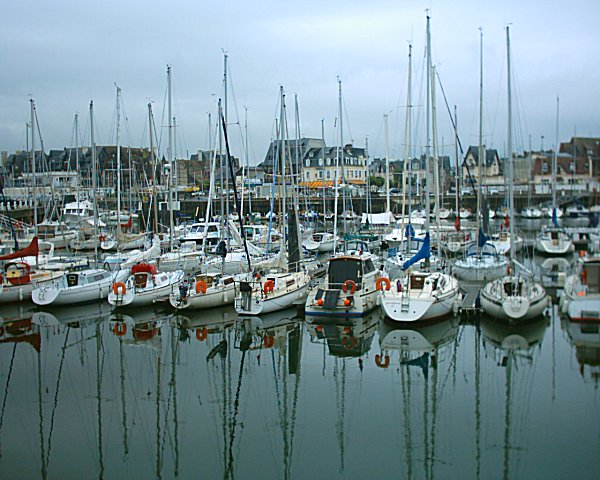
Bassin à flot.

The pleasure port possesses 360 berths of which 60 are reserved for visitors. The port can accommodate ships of up to 15 m in length, 4.5 m in width with a draft of 2.5 m.

== Port Deauville ==
The Marina, built within the residential complex of Port Deauville was built in 1972 to compensate for the saturation of the yacht basin at Port Morny. It can accommodate up to 850 yachts, with 150 berths reserved for visitors. The marina is kept full with a lock, controlled by the harbour's capitainerie.

== Layout ==
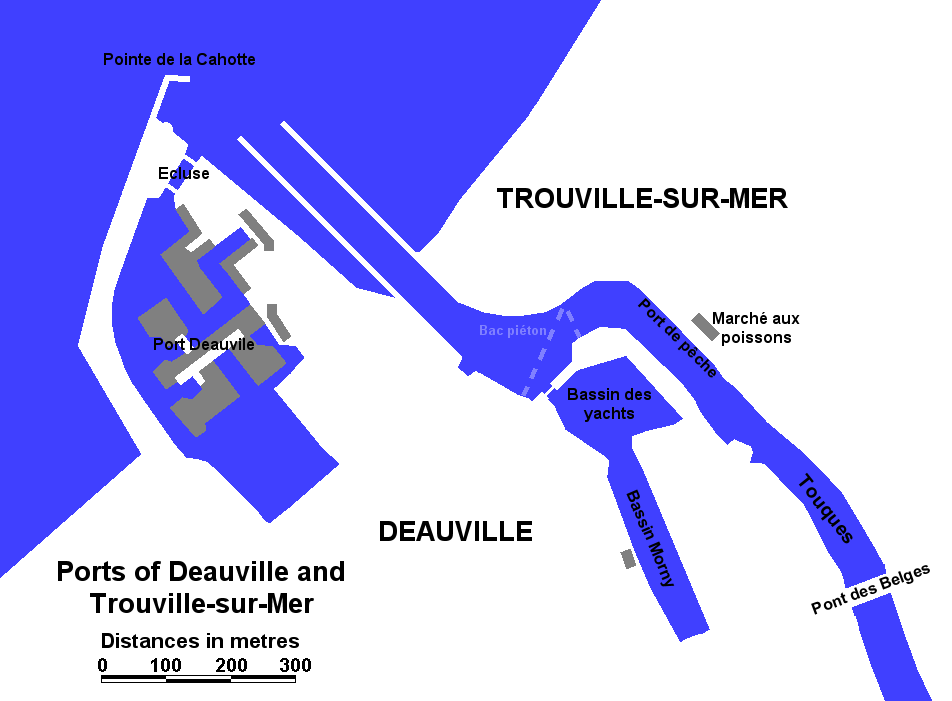
Ports of Deauvile.

== See also ==
- Port of Trouville-sur-Mer
