= List of paintings by Eugène Boudin =

This is an incomplete list of paintings by the French seascape artist Eugène Boudin (1824–1898).

Image	Name	Year	H x W (cm)	Current Location	Ref
	Sky, Setting Sun, Bushes in Foreground	c.1848–1853	11 x 19.5	Museum of modern art André Malraux - MuMa, Le Havre	
	Still Life with Lobster on a White Tablecloth (Nature Morte Au Homard Sur un Nappe Blanche)	c.1853–1856	57.2 x 81.9	High Museum of Art, Atlanta	
	Still Life with Squash	c.1854–1860	56.5 x 83	Museum of modern art André Malraux - MuMa, Le Havre	
	Seascape in Brittany	1855	32 x 51.6	Yale University Art Gallery	
	Fishermen's Wives	c.1855–1860	18.4 x 23.5	Metropolitan Museum of Art, New York	
	Ships in the Port of Honfleur (Navires dans la port à Honfleur)	1856	20.3 x 26.5	Princeton University Art Museum	
	Still Life with Peonies and Mock Orange	1856–1862	38.5 x 54	Museum of modern art André Malraux - MuMa, Le Havre	
	Still Life; Nature Morte	1858	36.8 x 60.4	Centraal Museum, Utrecht	
	Fishing Boat in Honfleur Harbor	1858	21.6 x 28.8	Detroit Institute of Arts	
	Festival in the Harbor of Honfleur	1858	41 x 59.3	National Gallery of Art, Washington	
	Pardon of Ste-Anne-La-Palud	1858	87 x 146.5	Museum of modern art André Malraux - MuMa, Le Havre	
	The Regatta	c.1858	17.46 x 26.35	Virginia Museum of Fine Arts, Richmond	
	Le pardon à la chapelle Sainte-Anne-la-Palud à Plonévez-Porzay	1858			
	Gerbe de Fleurs (a pair)	1860-1865	21.3 x 28.7	Deji Art Museum, Nanjing	
	Seascape with Open Sky (Marine au grand ciel)	1860	21.3 x 28.7	Cleveland Museum of Art	
	Beach Scene, Trouville	1860–1870	21.6 x 45.8	National Gallery, London	
	Beach Scene	1862	31.2 x 47.4	National Gallery of Art, Washington	
	Beach Scene at Trouville	1863	34.8 x 57.5	National Gallery of Art, Washington	
	Beach at Trouville	1863	7.25 x 13.74	The Phillips Collection, Washington	
	On the Beach at Trouville	1863	25.4 x 45.7	Metropolitan Museum of Art, New York	
	Jetty and Wharf at Trouville	1863	34.8 x 58	National Gallery of Art, Washington	
	Figures on a Beach	c.1863	21.9 x 45.4	Rhode Island School of Design Museum	
	Crinolines on the Beach	1863	26 x 47	Fondation Bemberg, Toulouse	
	The Beach at Deauville	1864	45.7 x 36.8	Cleveland Museum of Art	
	On the Beach, Dieppe	1864	31.8 x 29.2	Metropolitan Museum of Art, New York	
	The Beach at Villerville	1864	45.7 x 76.3	National Gallery of Art, Washington	
	The Beach at Trouville	1864	25.7 x 48	Musée des Beaux-Arts de Caen	
	The Beach at Grandchamps	1864	30.9 x 47.1	Art Gallery of New South Wales, Sydney	
	Vacationers on the Beach at Trouville	1864	67.3 x 104.1	Minneapolis Institute of Art	
	Approaching Storm	1864	36.3 x 57.9	Art Institute of Chicago	
	Beach at Trouville	1864–65	27 x 49.1	National Gallery of Art, Washington	
	Harbour at Honfleur	1865	20.3 x 26.7	Museum of Fine Arts, Boston	
	Beach Scene at Deauville	1865	41.9 x 64.77	Virginia Museum of Fine Arts	
	The Beach near Trouville	1865	35.7 x 57.7	Artizon Museum, Tokyo	
	On the Beach	1865	14.4 x 27.1 (watercolour)	Metropolitan Museum of Art, New York	
	Figures on Beach in Front of Bathing Huts	1865	16.8 x 26.4 (watercolour)	Yale University Art Gallery	
	The Beach at Trouville (La plage de Trouville)	1865	26.5 x 40.3	Musée d'Orsay, Paris	
	The Beach at Trouville	1865	38 x 62.8	Princeton University Art Museum	
	On the Beach, Sunset	1865	38.1 x 58.4	Metropolitan Museum of Art, New York	
	Bathing time at Deauville	1865	34.7 x 57.5	National Gallery of Art, Washington	
	Concert at the Casino of Deauville	1865	41.7 x 73	National Gallery of Art, Washington	
	Fashionable Figures on the Beach	1865	35.5 x 57.5	Museum of Fine Arts, Boston	
	Norman Women Spreading their Washing on a Beach (Normandes étendant du linge sur une plage)	1865	46.2 x 61.3	Musée d'Orsay, Paris	
	Beach House with Flags at Trouville	1865	19 x 34	National Gallery of Art, Washington	
	Beach Scene	c.1865–1867	54 x 75	Cleveland Museum of Art	
	Princess Pauline Metternich on the Beach	c.1865–1867	29.5 x 23.5	Metropolitan Museum of Art, New York	
	Pardon in Finistère	c.1865–1870	41.9 x 31.75	Virginia Museum of Fine Arts, Richmond	
	Regatta at Argenteuil	1866	45.5 x 73	Johannesburg Art Gallery	
	Village by a River	1867	35.6 x 58.4	Metropolitan Museum of Art, New York	
	The Beach at Trouville	1867	63 x 89	National Museum of Western Art, Tokyo	
	Figures on the Beach	c.1867–1870	38.2 x 61.2	National Gallery of Art, Washington	
	Lady in White on the Beach at Trouville	1869	31.4 x 48.6	Museum of modern art André Malraux - MuMa, Le Havre	
	Figures on the Beach in Trouville	1869	29 x 47	Thyssen-Bornemisza Museum, Madrid	
	On the Jetty	1869–70	18.4 x 27.4	National Gallery of Art, Washington	
	Coast of Brittany	1870	47.3 x 66	National Gallery of Art, Washington	
	Ships in Harbour	c.1870	24.7 x 35.5	High Museum of Art, Atlanta	
	Beach Scene, Trouville	1870	18.2 x 46.2	National Gallery, London	
	L'Hôpital-Camfrout, Brittany	c.1870–1872	20.3 x 39.4	National Gallery, London	
	Beach Scene	c.1870–1874	23.8 x 36.8	Yale University Art Gallery	
	Brussels Harbour	1871	42 x 65	National Gallery, London	
	Bassin du Commerce at Brussels	1871	20.2 x 27.7		
	Antwerp, Boats on the Scheldt	1871	40.3 x 65	High Museum of Art, Atlanta	
	Antwerp, the Escaut River	c.1871 –1874	43.5 x 58.4	Yale University Art Gallery	
	Antwerp, boats on the River Escaut	c.1871			
	Antwerp, Boats on the River Escaut	c.1871			
	Antwerp, Fishing Boats	c.1871			
	Antwerp, the head of Flanders	c.1871			
	Antwerp, the Port	c.1871			
	Antwerp, the Schelde	c.1871			
	Brest	1871	23.8 x 36.7 (watercolour)	Cincinnati Art Museum	
	The Beach at Trouville	1871	21.3 x 40.6	Yale University Art Gallery	
	Trouville	1871	18 x 46.4	Walters Art Museum, Baltimore	
	Plougastel: Shrimp Fisherwomen	1871	23.8 x 41.2	Scottish National Gallery	
	Port of Cameret	1872	55.5 x 89.5	Musée des Beaux-Arts d'Angers, France	
	Fishing Boats at Kerhor	1872	40.2 x 65.4	Princeton University Art Museum	
	Washerwoman near Trouville	c.1872–1876	27.6 x 41.3	National Gallery of Art, Washington D.C.	
	Trouville Harbour	1873	30.7 x 57.6	Scottish National Gallery	
	Beach at Trouville	1873	21.0 x 41.3	Norton Simon Museum, Pasadena	
	Beach Scene, Trouville	1873	15.5 x 29.9	National Gallery, London	
	Low tide, Portrieux	1873	32 x 46	Fitzwilliam Museum, Cambridge, UK	
	Fair in Brittany	1874	26.67 x 45.72	National Gallery of Art, Washington D.C.	
	Harbour Entrance	1873	37.2 x 59.7	Museum of Fine Arts, Boston	
	Casimir Delavigne Basin at Le Havre	1874	37.5 x 47	Detroit Institute of Arts	
	Bordeaux, the Harbor	1874	30.3 x 36.3	Walters Art Museum, Baltimore	
	View of Bordeaux, from the Quai des Chartrons	1874	80.5 x 115.5	Cleveland Museum of Art	
	The Port of Bordeaux	1874	40 x 65.4	Scottish National Gallery	
	Dordrecht, the Grote Kerk	1874	35.1 x 26.4	Brooklyn Museum, New York City	
	Return of the Terre-Neuvier	1875	73.5 x 100.7	National Gallery of Art, Washington D.C.	
	Le rivage de Portrieux, Côtes-du-Nord	1875	32 x 46.5	Museo Nacional de Bellas Artes (Buenos Aires)	
	Beach at Trouville	1875	24.5 x 12.5	Courtauld Institute of Art, London	
	Washerwomen at the Edge of the Pond	1875–1885	18.4 x 24.8	Art Institute of Chicago	
	Bordeaux, Boats on the Garonne	1876		Columbus Museum of Art, Ohio (?)	
	Rotterdam, Le Pont de la Bourse	1876	31 x 44	Fondation Bemberg (?)	
	The Beach	1877	11 x 25.6	National Gallery of Art, Washington D.C.	
	The Bassin du Commerce at Le Havre	1878	38 x 55	Private collection	
	Harbour	aft. 1879	30.5 x 40.6	San Diego Museum of Art	
	Estuary	1880	21.6 x 31.1	High Museum of Art, Atlanta	
	Washerwomen by the River	c.1880–1885	26.2 x 36.2	Israel Museum, Jerusalem	
	Parc Cordier in Trouville	c.1880–1885	51 x 62	Museu Nacional d'Art de Catalunya, Barcelona	
	Women on the Beach at Berck	1881	24.8 x 36.2	National Gallery of Art, Washington D.C.	
	Studies of Cows	c.1881–1888	43.1 x 69	Museum of modern art André Malraux - MuMa, Le Havre	
	Landscape. Cows in a Pasture	c.1881–1888	23 x 32.6	Museum of modern art André Malraux - MuMa, Le Havre	
	Washerwomen	c.1881–1889	17.3 x 31.2	Museum of modern art André Malraux - MuMa, Le Havre	
	Berck, Beach Scene	1882	29.4 x 46	Israel Museum, Jerusalem	
	The Inlet at Berck	1882	54.6 x 75	Museum of Fine Arts, Boston	
	Entrance to the Harbour, Le Havre	1883	118.6 x 160.2	National Gallery of Art, Washington D.C.	
	Le Havre	1883	52.39 x 72.87	National Gallery of Art, Washington D.C.	
	La Touques near Deauville	1883	55 x 74.5	Art Institute of Chicago	
	Washerwomen near a Bridge	1883	32 x 41	Museum of Fine Arts, Boston	
	Low Tide near Trouville	c.1883–1887	23.5 x 32.5	Foundation E.G. Bührle	
	The Beach at Trouville	1884	13.7 x 23.4	Scottish National Gallery	
	Environs de Dordrecht, chantier de réparation de bateaux	1884		High Museum of Art, Atlanta	
	Dordrecht, vue de port	1884		High Museum of Art, Atlanta	
	Le Havre, the Port	1884	32.4 x 41.1	Brooklyn Museum, New York City	
	The Square of the Church of Saint Vulfran in Abbeville	1884	44.5 x 37	Thyssen-Bornemisza Museum, Madrid	
	The Meuse at Dordrecht	1884	46 x 64.7	Dordrechts Museum, Netherlands	
	La Place Ary Scheffer, Dordrecht	1884		Dordrechts Museum, Netherlands	
	Landscape (Fervaques)	1884	55.5 x 77.1	High Museum of Art, Atlanta	
	Port de Trouville	1884	46 x 65	Botero Museum, Bogotá	
	View of the Voorstraatshaven in Dordrecht	1884		Dordrechts Museum, Netherlands	
	The Trawlers	1885	18.4 x 26.4	National Gallery of Art, Washington D.C.	
	Trouville, Les Jetees à Maree Basse	1885	23.8 x 32.7	Museum of Fine Arts, Boston	
	The Port, Trouville	1885	45.7 x 65.1	Brooklyn Museum, New York City	
	Trouville, chantier naval	1885-1890		High Museum of Art, Atlanta	
	The Harbour of Le Havre	c.1885–1890	26 x 35.2	Yale University Art Gallery	
	Sailboats near Trouville	c.1885–1890	31.4 x 41.9	Yale University Art Gallery	
	Laundresses by a Stream	c.1885–1890	17.8 x 22.9	National Gallery, London	
	Low Tide, Berck	1886	50.2 x 61.3	Norton Simon Museum, Pasadena	
	Low Tide, Étaples	1886	79 x 109	Musée des Beaux-Arts de Bordeaux	'
	Port of Le Havre	c.1886	39.7 x 54.3	Museum of Fine Arts, Boston	
	On the Beach, Trouville	1887	18.4 x 32.7	National Gallery of Art, Washington D.C.	
	Ships at Le Havre	1887	34.9 x 26.4	Museum of Fine Arts, Boston	
	Ships and Sailing Boats Leaving Le Havre	1887	90.4 x 139.5	National Gallery of Art, Washington D.C.	
	The Beach at Trouville (Trouville, la plage)	c.1887–1896	36.5 x 58.4	Brooklyn Museum, New York City	
	Beach at Trouville	1888	14.3 x 23.8	Norton Simon Museum, Pasadena	
	The Entrance to Trouville Harbour	1888	32.4 x 40.9	National Gallery, London	
	Entrance to the Port of Le Havre	1888	90.17 x 130.49	Virginia Museum of Fine Arts, Richmond	
	Deauville Harbour	c.1888–1890	28.8 x 41.3	National Gallery, London	
	Ship on the Touques	c.1888–1895	32.5 x 23.8	National Gallery of Art, Washington D.C.	
	Trouville at Low Tide	c.1888–1895	21.9 x 31.4	Yale University Art Gallery	
	The Port of Trouville	c.1888–1895	31.9 x 41.1	Yale University Art Gallery	
	A French Fishing Fleet with Packet Boat	1889	141.3 x 168.3	Virginia Museum of Fine Arts, Richmond	
	Étretat	1890	41 x 55	San Diego Museum of Art	
	Étretat. The Cliff of Aval	1890	79.9 x 109.9	Thyssen-Bornemisza Museum, Madrid	
	Beach at Trouville	1890s	35.6 x 58.1	National Gallery, London	
	Boats and Breakwater	c.1890–1897	40 x 55	Museum of modern art André Malraux - MuMa, Le Havre	
	Étretat	1891	78.5 x 110	Chazen Museum of Art, Madison, Wisconsin	
	Trouville	1891	39.1 x 54.3	Cincinnati Art Museum	
	Dock at Deauville	1891	80.5 x 116	Cleveland Museum of Art	
	View of the Port of Saint-Valéry-sur-Somme	1891	45.2 x 64	Cleveland Museum of Art	
	The Port, Saint-Valéry-sur-Somme	1892	32.5 x 40.8	Brooklyn Museum, New York City	
	St. Vaast-la-Hougue	1892	53 x 78	Art Gallery of South Australia	
	Beaulieu: The Bay of Fourmis	1892	54.9 x 90.2	Metropolitan Museum of Art, New York	
	Villefranche	1892	41 x 32.7	Clark Art Institute, Williamstown, Massachusetts	
	Villefranche Harbour	1892	46 x 65	Scottish National Gallery	
	Quay at Villefranche	1892	50.7 x 74.6	Museum of Fine Arts, Boston	
	Antibes	c.1892–1898			
	Antibes	c.1892–1898			
	Antibes, the Fortifications	c.1892–1898			
	Antibes, the Point of the Islet	c.1892–1898			
	Antibes, the Rocks of the Islet	c.1892–1898			
	View of Antibes	1893	55.2 x 89.5	Detroit Institute of Arts	
	Juan-les-pins, the Bay and the Shore	1893	54.6 x 90.2	Museum of Fine Arts, Boston	
	The Beach at Tourgéville-les-Sablons	1893	50.8 x 74.3	National Gallery, London	
	Golfe-Juan	1893	27 x 41	Scottish National Gallery	
	Deauville	1893	74.2 x 50.8	Courtauld Institute of Art, London	
	Beach at Trouville	1893	56 x 91	Hermitage Museum, St Petersburg	
	Figures on the Beach	1893	36.5 x 59.1	Museum of Fine Arts, Boston	
	Shore at Berck (Berck, Pecheurs sur la plage, marée basse)	1894	22.5 x 33	Foundation E.G. Bührle	
	Beach at Trouville, Stormy Weather	1894	15.6 x 24.1	Virginia Museum of Fine Arts, Richmond	
	On the Beach	1894	13.9 x 23.9	National Gallery of Art, Washington D.C.	
	Washerwomen on the Banks of the Touques	1894	26.7 x 41	Scottish National Gallery	
	Washerwomen on the Beach of Etretat	1894	37.2 x 54.9	National Gallery of Art, Washington D.C.	
	Venice	1895	35 x 55	Scottish National Gallery	
	View of Venice	1895	27 x 41	Private collection	
	Venice, the Grand Canal	1895	26 x 35.2	Thyssen-Bornemisza Museum, Madrid	
	Venice, Santa Maria della Salute from San Giorgio	1895	46.3 x 65.4	Museum of Fine Arts, Boston	
	Venice–Seascape at the Giudecca	1895	37.1 x 50	Princeton University Art Museum	
	The Bridge over the Touques at Deauville	1895	36.3 x 58.5	Scottish National Gallery	
	Yacht Basin at Trouville-Deauville	c.1895–96	45.8 x 37.1	National Gallery of Art, Washington D.C.	
	Gust of Wind at Frascati, Le Havre	1896	55.5 x 91	Petit Palais, Paris	
	Deauville at Low Tide	1897	55 x 95	Museum of Fine Arts, Boston	
	Pointe du Raz	1897	64.5 x 90.5	Museum of modern art André Malraux - MuMa	
	A Beach Scene			Musée Bonnat, Bayonne	
	Bay of Plougastel				
	Beach at Trouville				
	Beach Scene			Private collection	
	Beach Scene				
	Beach Scene				
	Beach Scene				
	Beach Scene				
	Beach Scene				
	Beach Scene				
	Beach Scene at Trouville				
	Beach Scene at Trouville				
	Beach Scene at Trouville				
	Beach Scene at Trouville				
	Beach Scene at Trouville				
	Beach Scene, the Yellow Umbrella				
	Beach Scene, Trouville				
	Berck, Fishermen at Low Tide				
	Berck, Fisherwomen on the Beach				
	Harbour Scene		23.2 x 32.4	Museum of Fine Arts, Boston	
	Honfleur. Le Jetée		38.4 x 25.4		
	Lighthouse at Honfleur		40 x 26.5	Private collection	
	Marine			Musée des Beaux-Arts de Strasbourg	
	Marine (Partie des bateaux de peche)			High Museum of Art, Atlanta	
	The Port, Trouville		18.2 x 27.1	Metropolitan Museum of Art, New York	
	The Women of Berck		28 x 40	Musée d'Orsay, Paris	
	The Harbour, Brest		23.1 x 36.1 (watercolour)	Metropolitan Museum of Art, New York	
