= The Fishing Boat =

Painting by Gustave Courbet

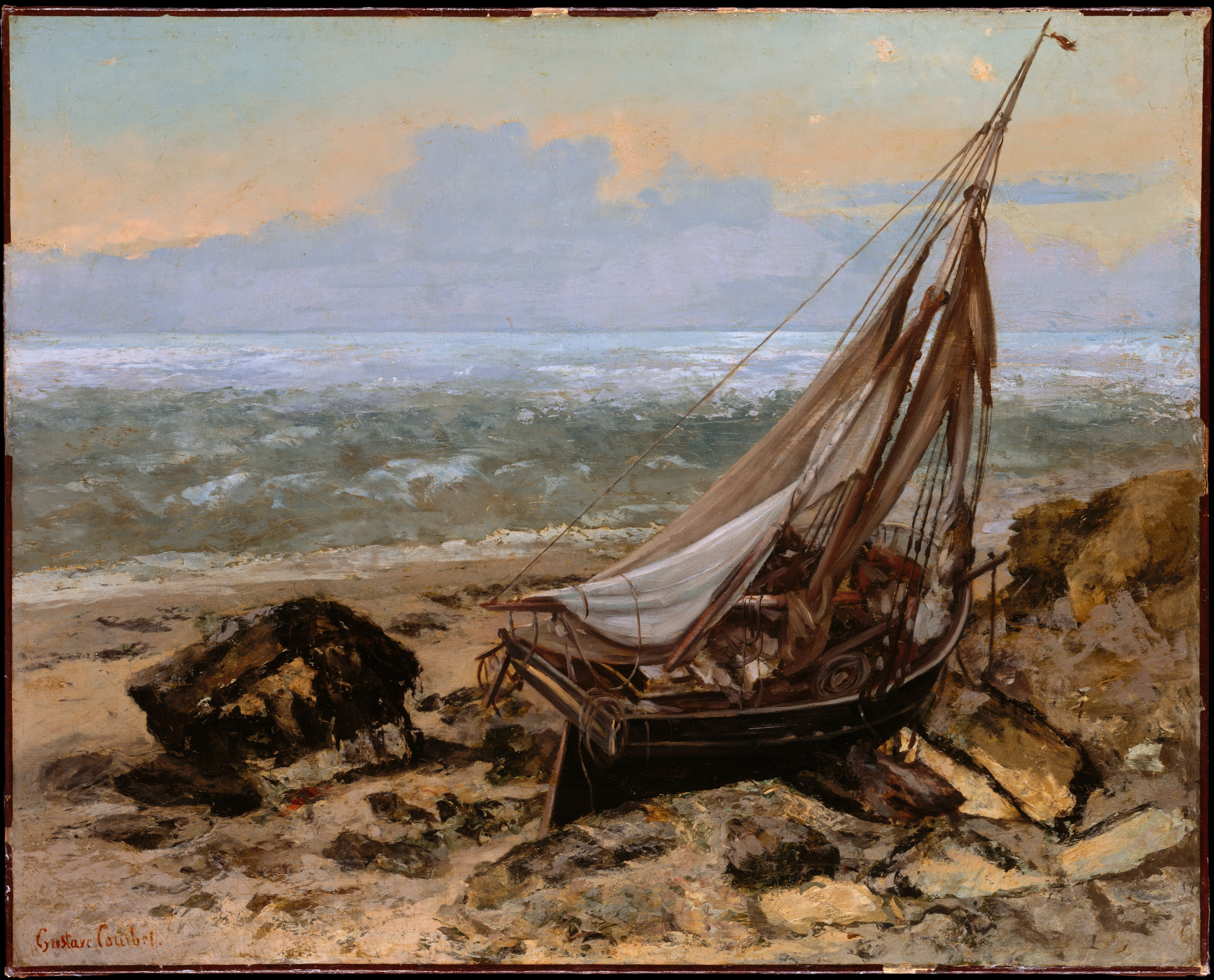
- Artist: Gustave Courbet
- Year: 1865
- Medium: Oil on canvas
- Dimensions: 64.8 cm × 81.3 cm (25.5 in × 32.0 in)
- Location: Metropolitan Museum of Art; New York

The Fishing Boat is an 1865 painting by French painter Gustave Courbet. Done in oil on canvas, the painting depicts a beached fishing boat on the French coastline near Trouville. It is currently in the collection of the Metropolitan Museum of Art, in New York.

The work was one of a series of 35 oil paintings that Courbet produced in quick succession during the fall of 1865. Unlike many other marine paintings of that time, the boat is the central feature of the composition rather than a minor element. The Fishing Boat was the first work by Courbet to enter the Met's collection when it was acquired in 1899.
