= Princess Pauline Metternich on the Beach =

Painting by Eugène Boudin

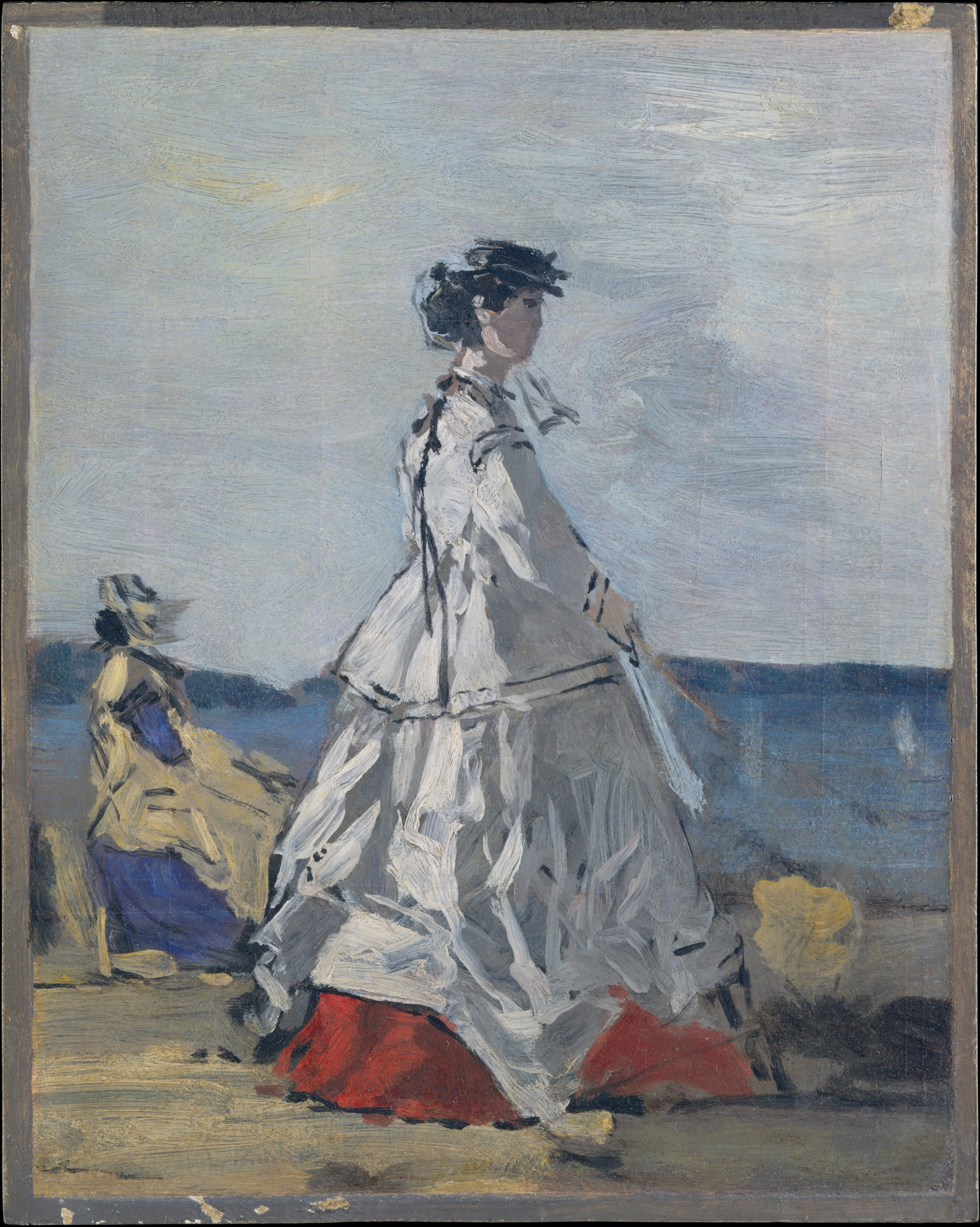
- Artist: Eugène Boudin
- Year: c. 1865-1867
- Medium: Oil on cardboard, laid down on wood
- Dimensions: 29.5 cm × 23.5 cm (11.6 in × 9.3 in)
- Location: Metropolitan Museum of Art, New York

Princess Pauline Metternich on the Beach is an oil on cardboard, laid down on wood, painting by French artist Eugène Boudin, from c. 1865-1867. The work depicts Pauline von Metternich, the wife of the Austrian ambassador to the court of Napoleon III and a well-known fashion icon, looking out to sea from a beach in northern France.

The work is in the collection of the Metropolitan Museum of Art, in New York.

== See also ==
- List of paintings by Eugène Boudin
