= Venice, Santa Maria della Salute from San Giorgio =

1895 painting by Eugène Boudin

Venice, Santa Maria Della Salute from San Giorgio
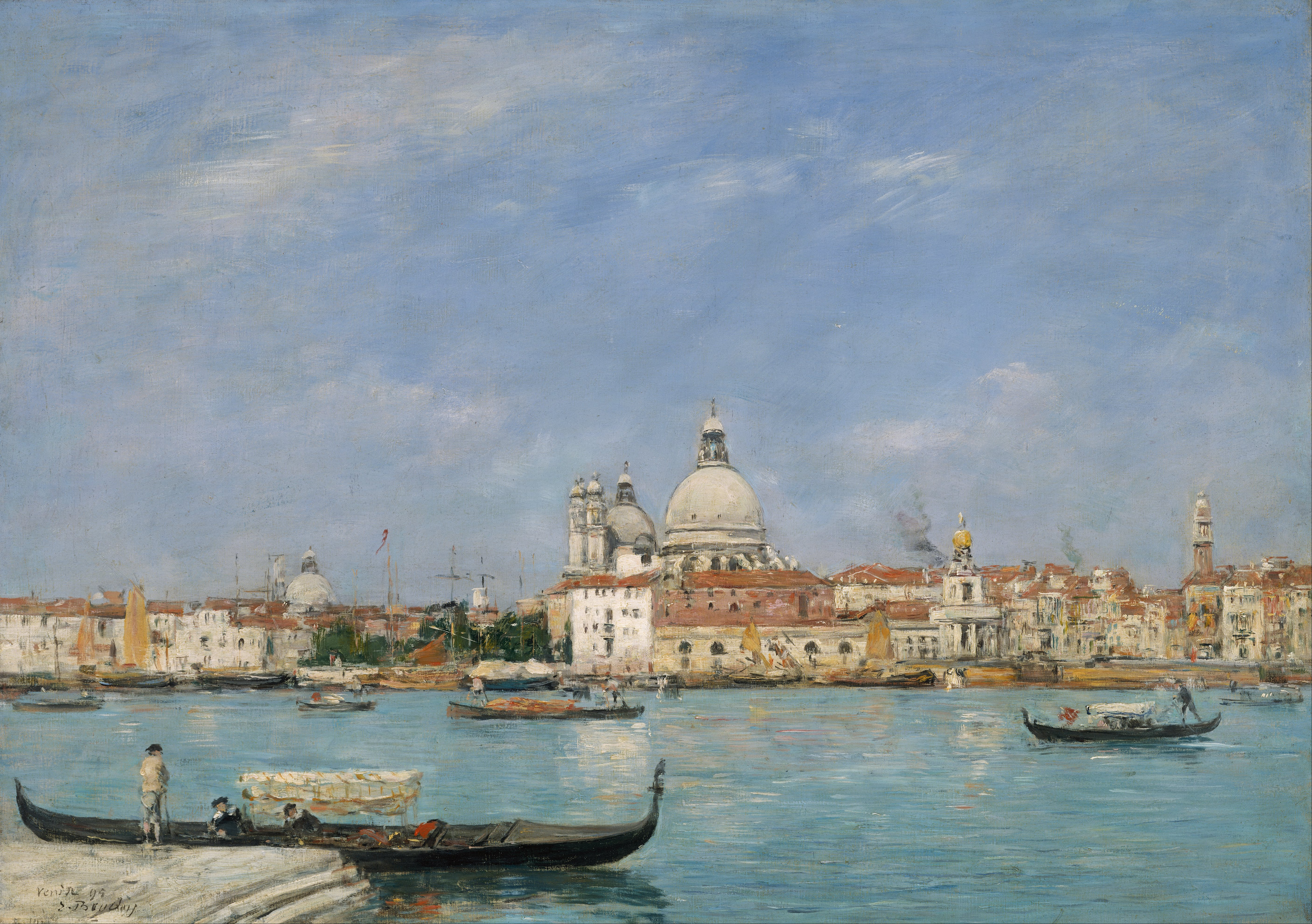
- Artist: Eugène Boudin
- Year: 1895
- Medium: Oil on canvas
- Dimensions: 46.3 x 65.4 cm
- Location: Museum of Fine Arts, Boston

Venice, Santa Maria della Salute from San Giorgio, is an oil painting by Eugène Louis Boudin, made on his 1895 trip to Venice. It that shows the Basilica di Santa Maria della Salute from the viewpoint of the San Giorgio Maggiore. Boudin created many paintings of Venice on this trip like "View of Venice", "Venice, the Grand Canal", and "Venice–Seascape at the Giudecca".

The painting is 46.3 cm by 65.4 cm, and it features an inscription in the lower-left corner that says "Venise 95. / E. Boudin". Boudin created at least three versions of this view, the focus point of which is the Salute, or Santa Maria della Salute.

The painting was in the possession of the Parisian gallery MM. Allard et Noel by 1899, and was lent to the "Exposition des oeuvres d'Eugene Boudin". By 1919, it was in the possession of Robert J. Edwards, a resident of Boston. Upon his death in 1924, Edwards bequeathed the object to the Museum of Fine Arts, Boston (MFA) in memory of his mother, Juliana Cheney Edwards. The object was formally accessioned by the MFA on April 2, 1925, as part of a shared collection owned by the Edwards siblings.
