= Touques (river) =

River in France

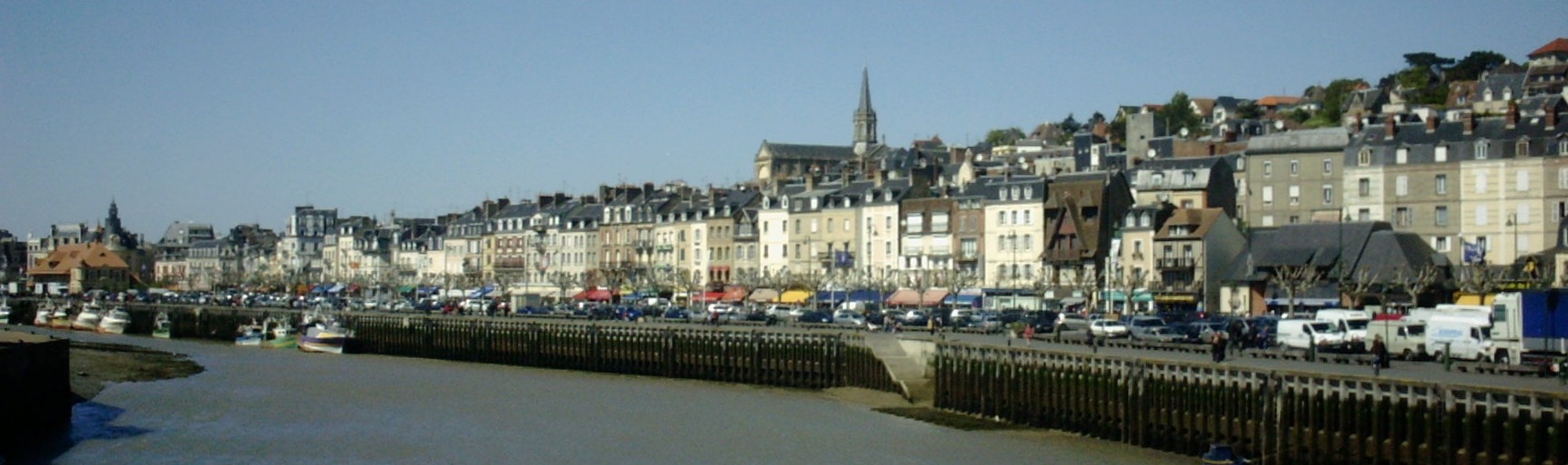
- Banks of the Touques in Trouville-sur-Mer

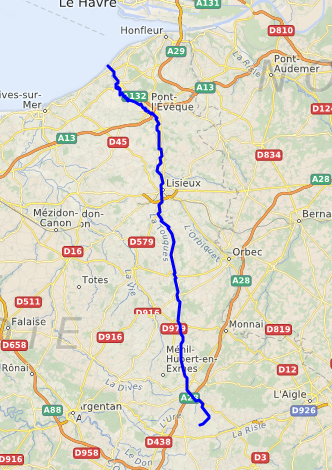
- Native name: La Touques (French)

Location
- Country: France

Physical characteristics
- Source
  - location: Perche
  - coordinates: 48.7189°N 0.3223°E
  - elevation: 270 m (890 ft)
- Mouth
  - location: English Channel
  - coordinates: 49°22′2″N 0°4′27″E
- Length: 108 km (67 mi)
- Basin size: 1,305 km^{2} (504 sq mi)
- Discharge
  - average: 13.5 m^{3}/s (480 cu ft/s)

The Touques (French pronunciation: [tuk]) is a small 108-kilometre-long (67 mi) coastal river in Pays d'Auge in Normandy, France. The Touques is officially navigable up to the Pont des Belges, 800 m (2,600 ft) from its estuary. Its source is in the Perche hills, south of Gacé. The river runs northwards, and flows into the English Channel between the communes of Deauville and Trouville-sur-Mer in North-Western Calvados. Two ports, the Port of Trouville-sur-Mer and Port of Deauville are situated on the river mouth opposite each other.

The Touques was diverted and straightened at the end of the 19th century and the neighbouring swamps dried and built on. Trouville-Deauville station was built on the river's former bed.

Trouville's harbour dock wall was rebuilt at the end of the 1990s due to erosion of the dock's stone wall.

The Touques flows through the following départements and towns:

- Orne: Gacé, Sap-en-Auge
- Calvados: Lisieux, Pont-l'Évêque, Touques, Trouville-sur-Mer, Deauville
