= Eugène Boudin =

French painter

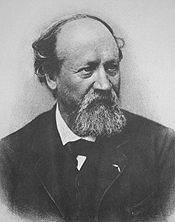
- Eugène Boudin, c. 1890s
- Born: Eugène Louis Boudin; 12 July 1824; Honfleur, France
- Died: 8 August 1898 (aged 74); Deauville, France
- Known for: Painting
- Movement: Impressionism

Eugène Louis Boudin (French: [øʒɛn lwi budɛ̃]; 12 July 1824 – 8 August 1898) was one of the first French landscape painters to paint outdoors. Boudin was a marine painter, and expert in the rendering of all that goes upon the sea and along its shores. His pastels, summary and economic, garnered the splendid eulogy of Baudelaire; and Corot called him the "King of the skies".

== Biography ==
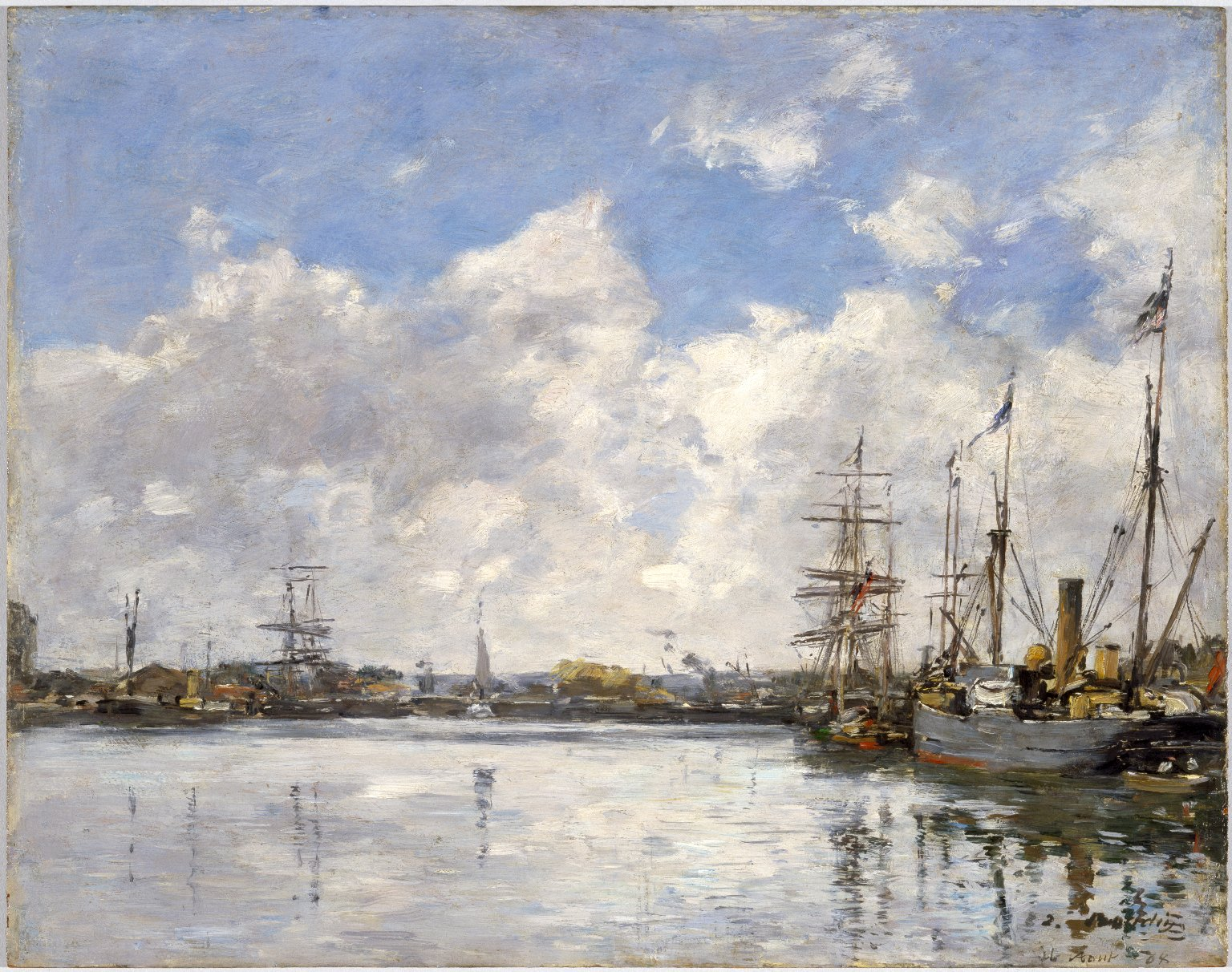
Le Havre, The Port (1884), Brooklyn Museum

Born at Honfleur, Boudin was the son of a harbor pilot, and at age 10 the young boy worked on a steamboat that ran between Le Havre and Honfleur. In 1835 the family moved to Le Havre, where Boudin's father opened a store for stationery and picture frames. Here the young Eugene worked, later opening his own small shop. Boudin's father had thus abandoned seafaring, and his son gave it up too, having no real vocation for it, though he preserved to his last days much of a sailor's character: frankness, accessibility, and open-heartedness.

In his shop, in which pictures were framed, Boudin came into contact with artists working in the area and exhibited in the shop the paintings of Constant Troyon and Jean-François Millet, who, along with Jean-Baptiste Isabey and Thomas Couture whom he met during this time, encouraged young Boudin to follow an artistic career. At the age of 22 he abandoned the world of commerce, started painting full-time, and travelled to Paris the following year and then through Flanders. In 1850 he earned a scholarship that enabled him to move to Paris, where he enrolled as a student in the studio of Eugène Isabey and worked as a copyist at the Louvre. To supplement his income he often returned to paint in Normandy and, from 1855, made regular trips to Brittany. On 14 January 1863 he married the 28-year-old Breton woman Marie-Anne Guédès in Le Havre and set up home in Paris.

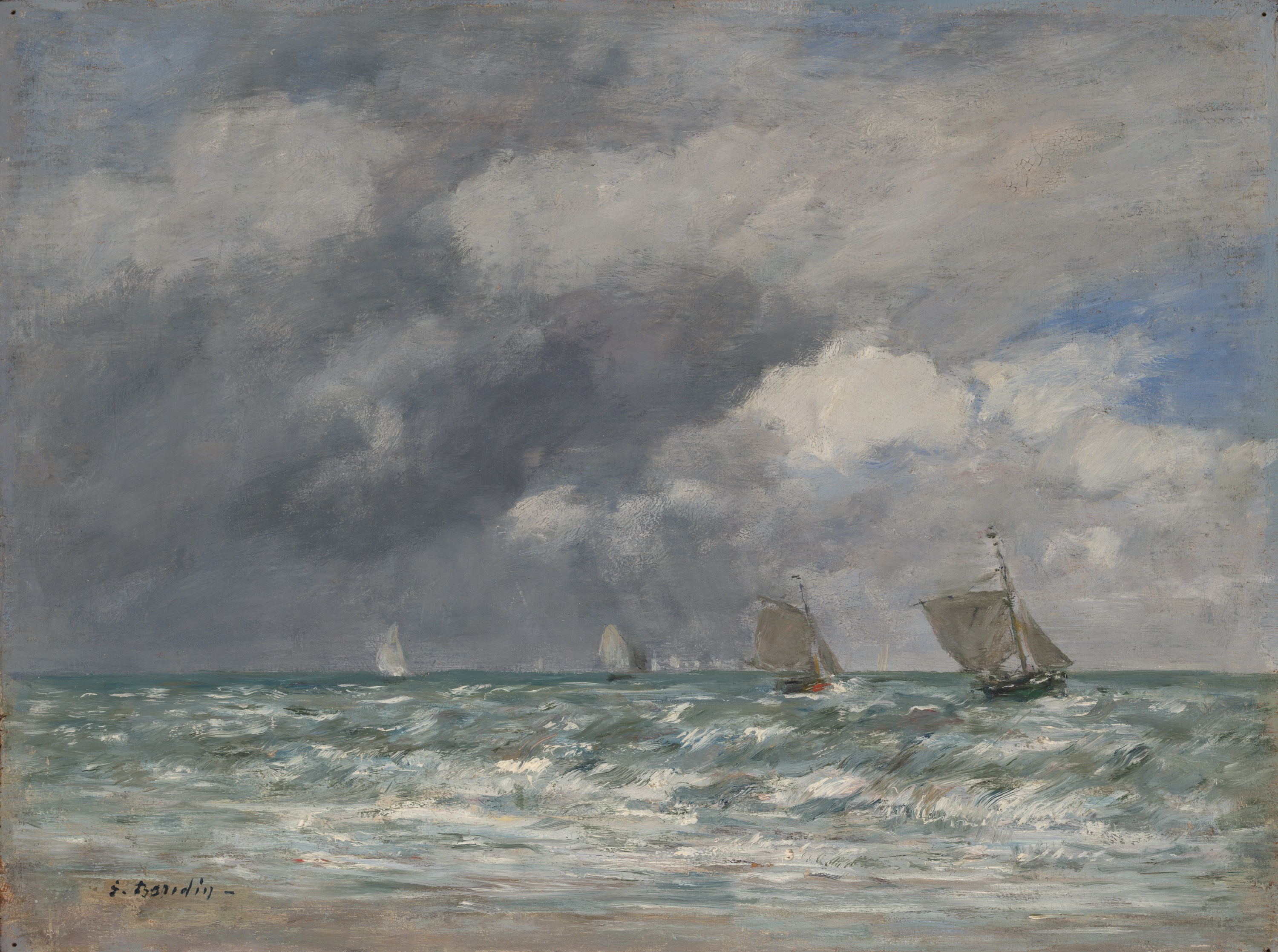
Sailboats at Trouville (1884), Yale University Art Gallery, Collection of Mr. and Mrs. Paul Mellon

Dutch 17th-century masters profoundly influenced him, and on meeting the Dutch painter Johan Jongkind, who had already made his mark in French artistic circles, Boudin was advised by his new friend to paint outdoors (en plein air). He also worked with Troyon and Isabey, and in 1859 met Gustave Courbet who introduced him to Charles Baudelaire, the first critic to draw Boudin's talents to public attention when the artist made his debut at the Paris Salon of 1859.

In 1857/58 Boudin befriended the young Claude Monet, then only 17, and persuaded him to give up his teenage caricature drawings and to become a landscape painter, helping to instil in him a love of bright hues and the play of light on water later evident in Monet's Impressionist paintings. The two remained lifelong friends and Monet later paid tribute to Boudin's early influence. Boudin joined Monet and his young friends in the First Impressionist Exhibition in 1874, but never considered himself a radical or innovator.

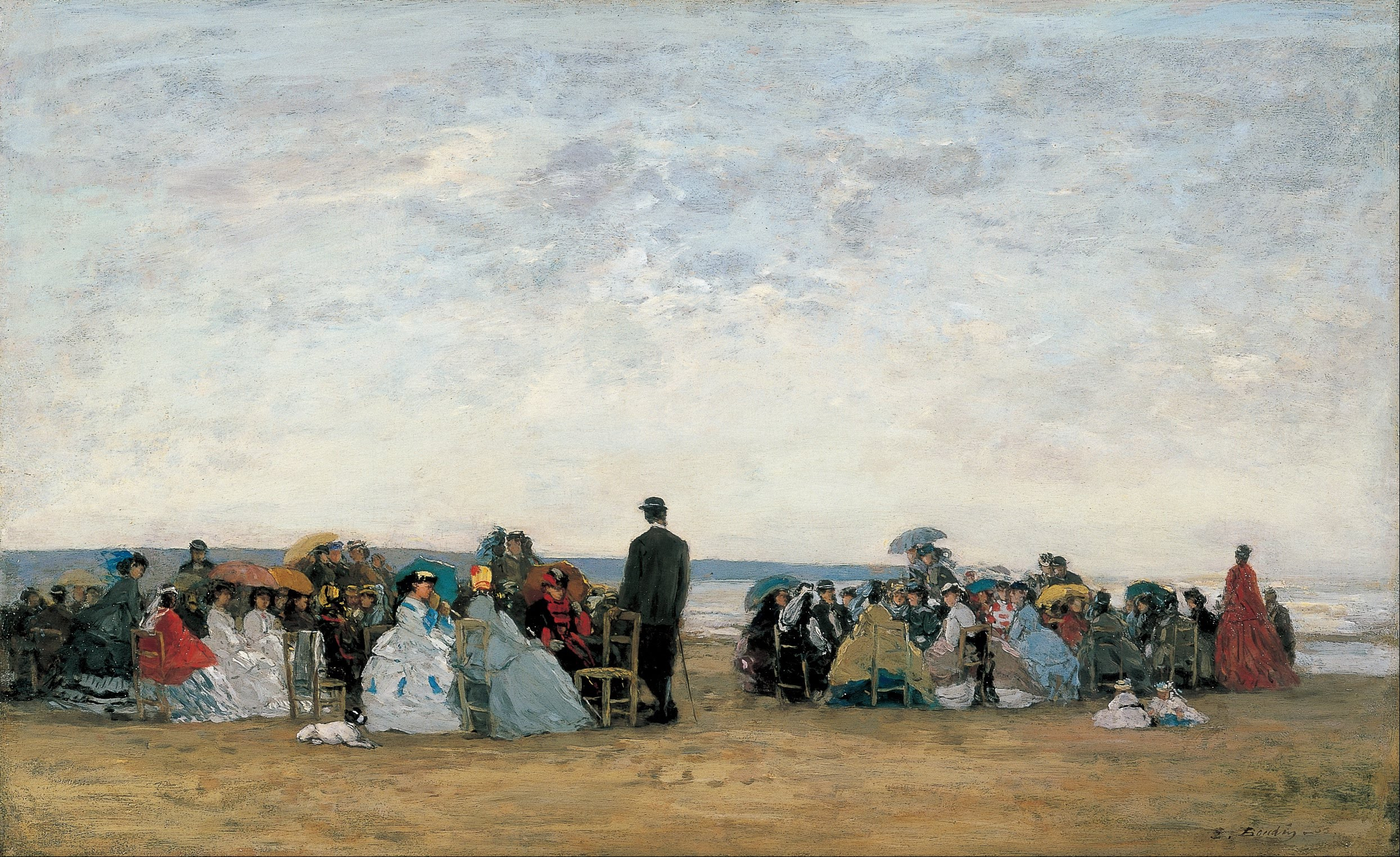
The Beach near Trouville, circa 1865

Both Boudin and Monet lived abroad during the Franco-Prussian War of 1870–71, Boudin in Antwerp and Monet in London; from 1873 to 1880 the Boudins lived in Bordeaux. His growing reputation enabled him to travel extensively at that time, visiting Belgium, the Netherlands and southern France. He continued to exhibit at the Paris Salons, receiving a third place medal at the Paris Salon of 1881, and a gold medal at the 1889 Exposition Universelle. In 1892 Boudin was made a knight of the Légion d'honneur, a somewhat tardy recognition of his talents and influence on the art of his contemporaries.

Late in his life, after the death of his wife in 1889, Boudin spent every winter in the south of France as a refuge from his own poor health, and from 1892 to 1895 made regular trips to Venice. In 1898, recognizing that his life was almost spent, he returned to his home at Deauville, to die on 8 August within sight of the English Channel and under the Channel skies he had painted so often. He was buried according to his wishes in the Saint-Vincent Cemetery in Montmartre, Paris.

== Legacy ==
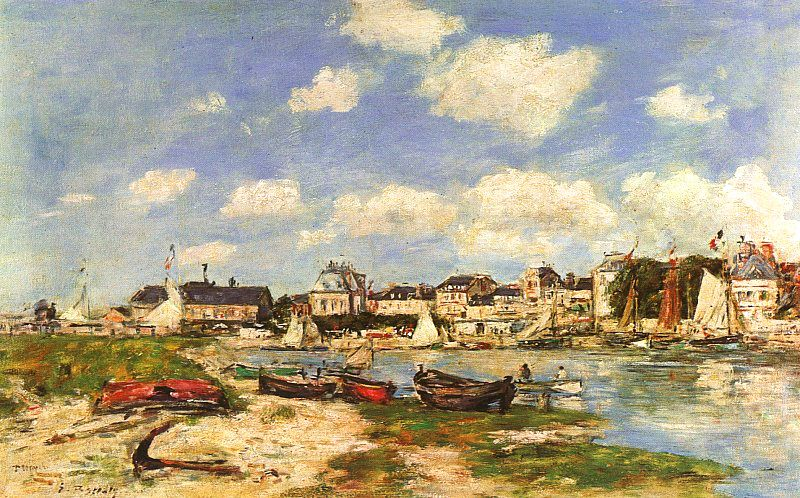
Trouville, 1864

The Beach at Villerville, 1864. Oil on canvas. National Gallery of Art, Washington D.C. (Zoomview).

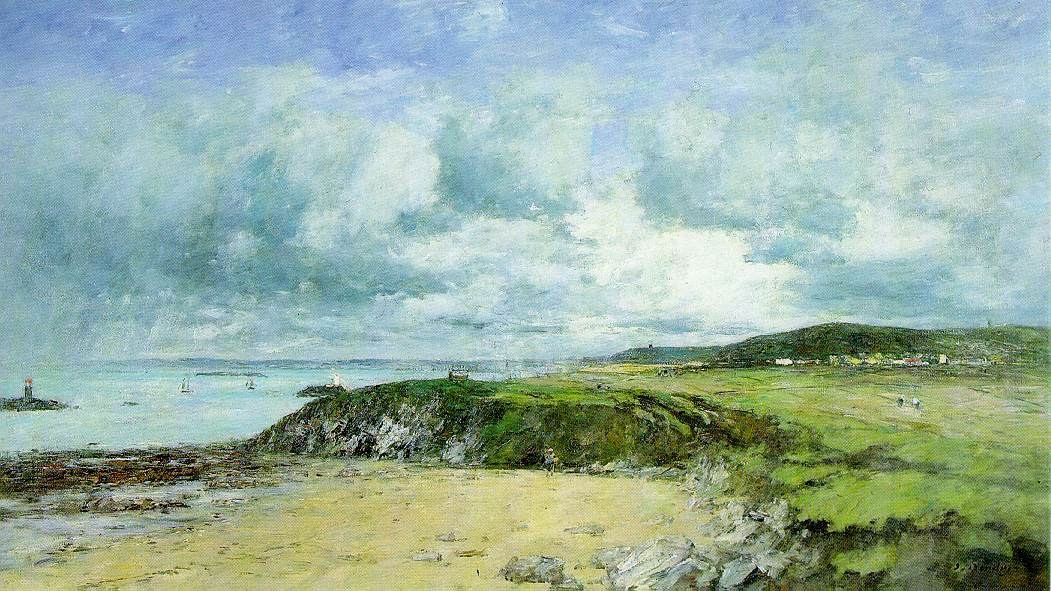
Rivage de Pontrieux, Cotes-du-Nord, 1874

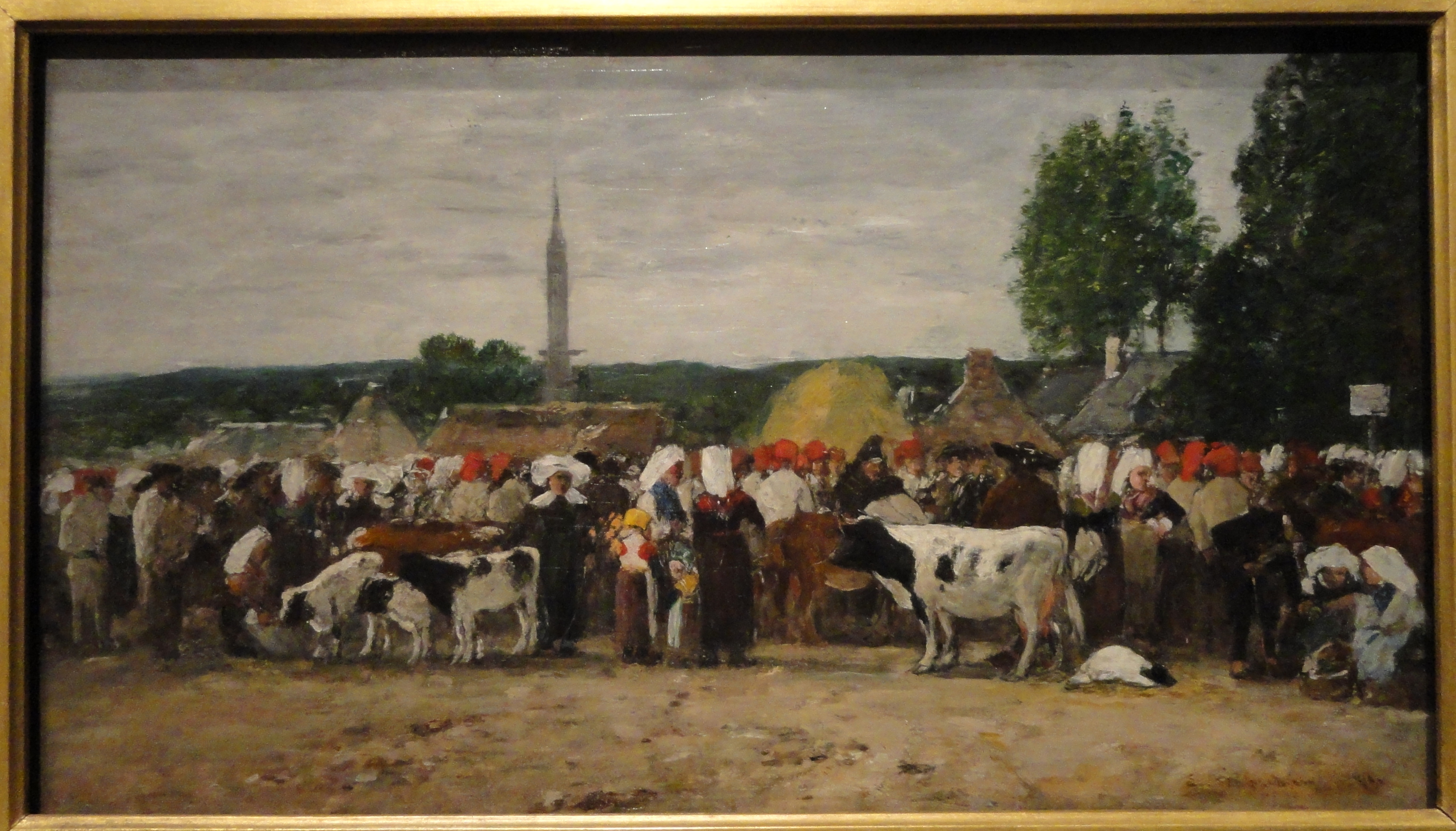
Fair in Brittany, one of Boudin's "Brittany" paintings (1874), Corcoran Gallery of Art

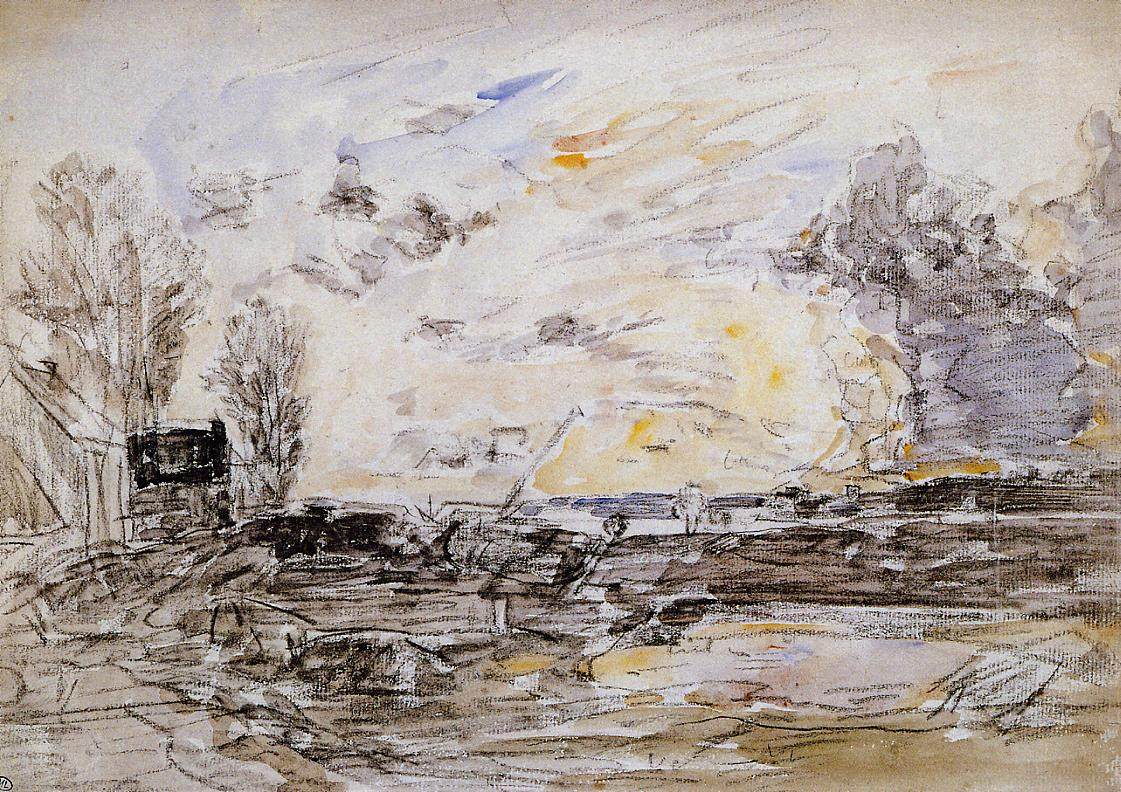
Landscape with Sunset. 1880–1890. Watercolour. Musée d'Orsay, Paris

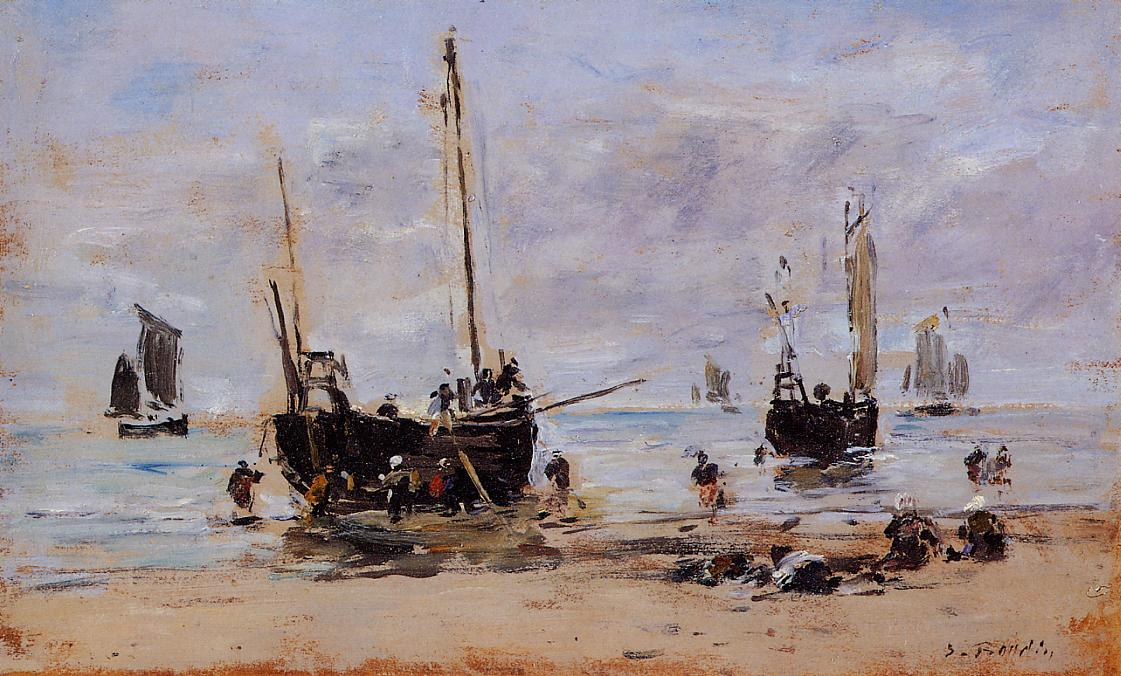
Berck, Fishermen at Low Tide

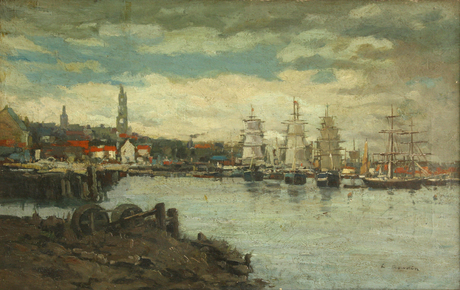
Sea port, National Gallery of Armenia

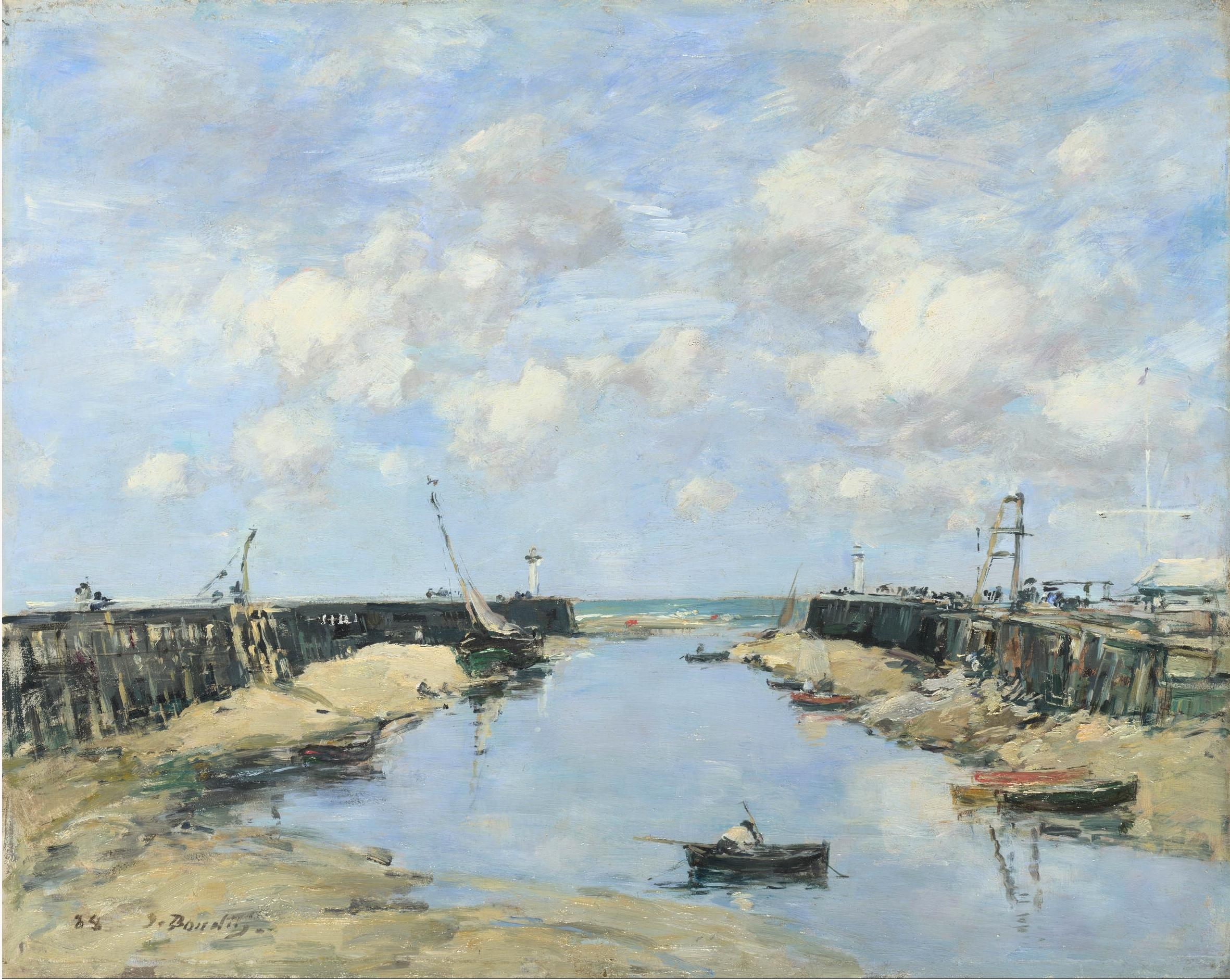
The Entrance to Trouville Harbour, 1888, National Gallery

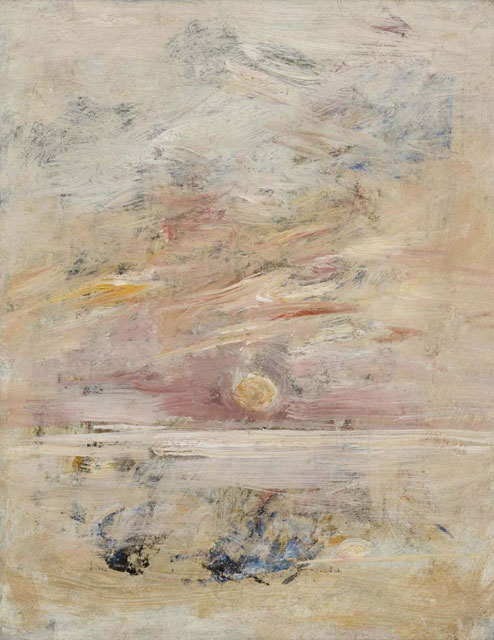
Study of sky, c. 1888–1895, Musée Malraux, Le Havre

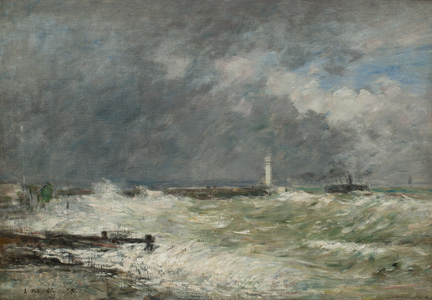
Entrée des jetées du Havre par gros temps, 1895, Musée Malraux, Le Havre

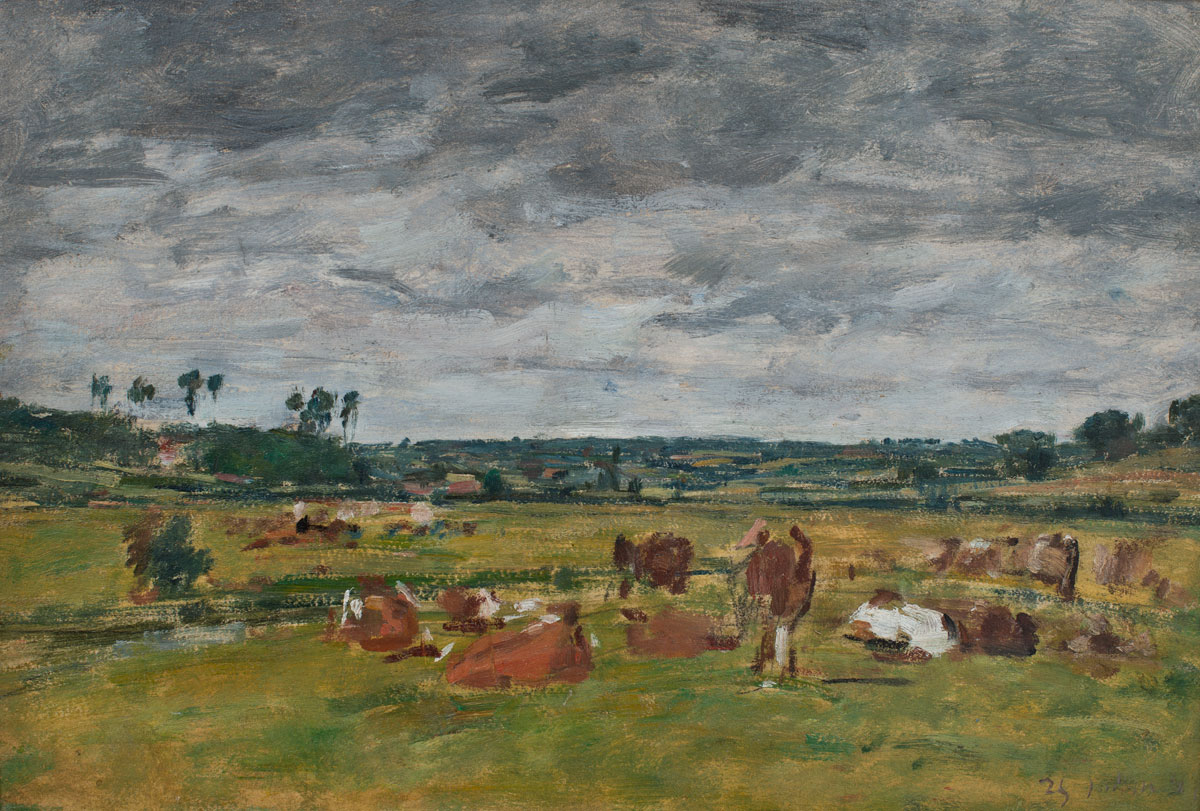
Landscape with Cows, 1881, Musée Malraux, Le Havre

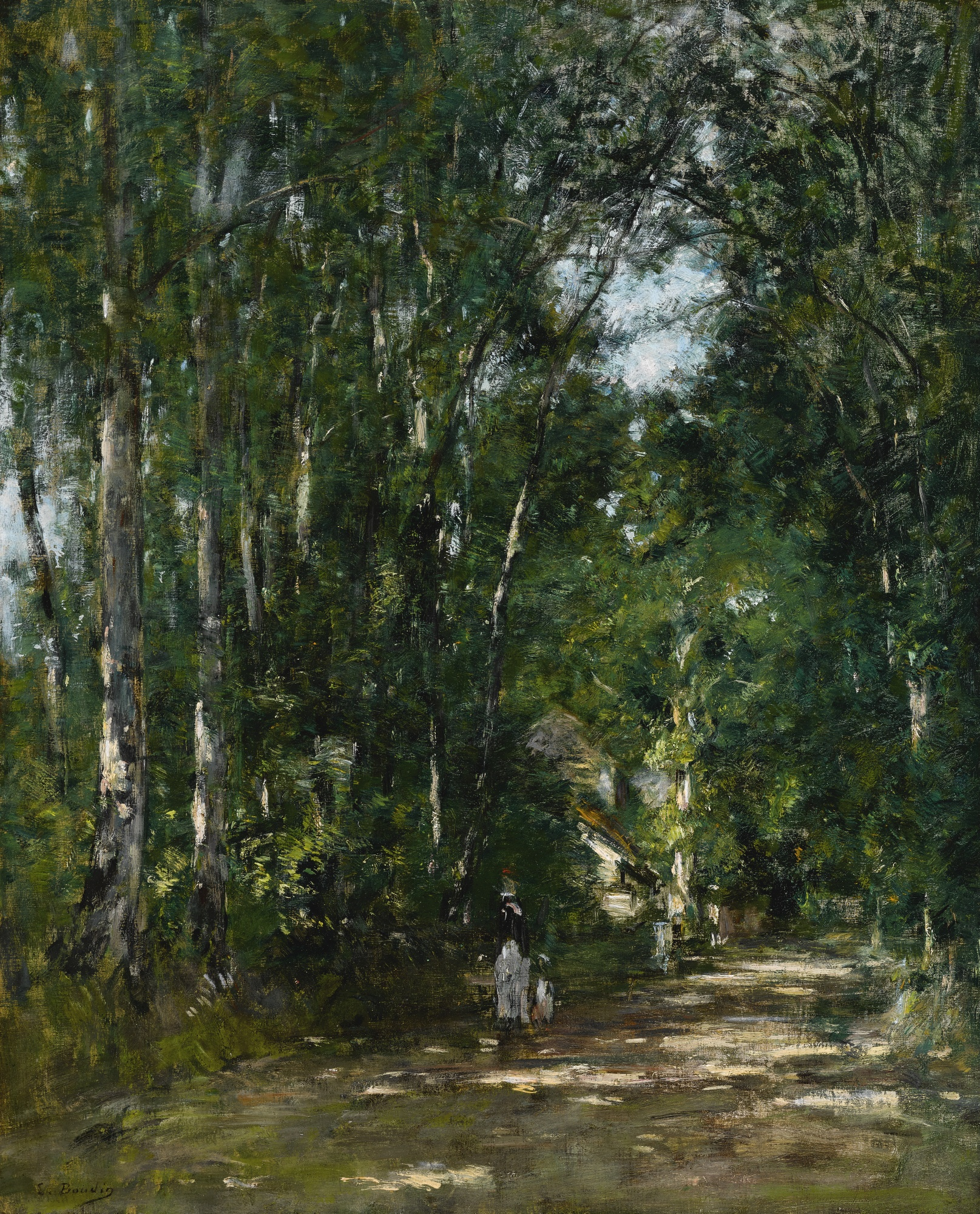
Environs De Trouville, Allée Sous Bois. 1880–1885. Oil on canvas

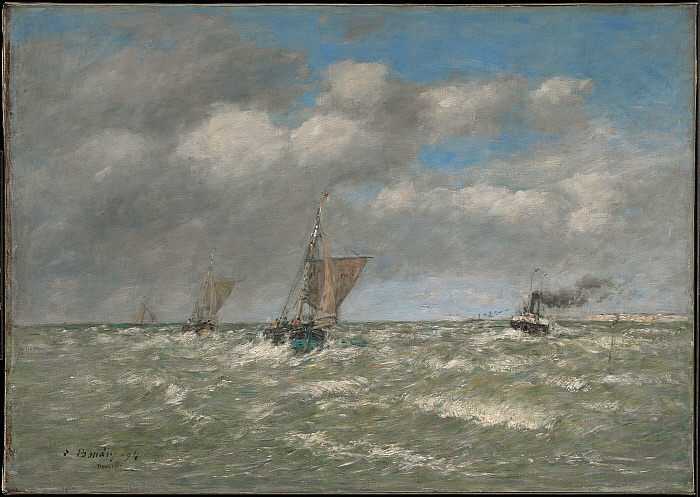
Boats Returning to Port, Trouville (1894), oil on canvas, marouflaged to aluminum, 25 7/8 x 36 5/16 in. (65.7 x 92.2 cm) Frame: 33 1/4 x 43 3/4 x 2 3/4 in. (84.5 x 111.1 x 7 cm), Clark Art Institute

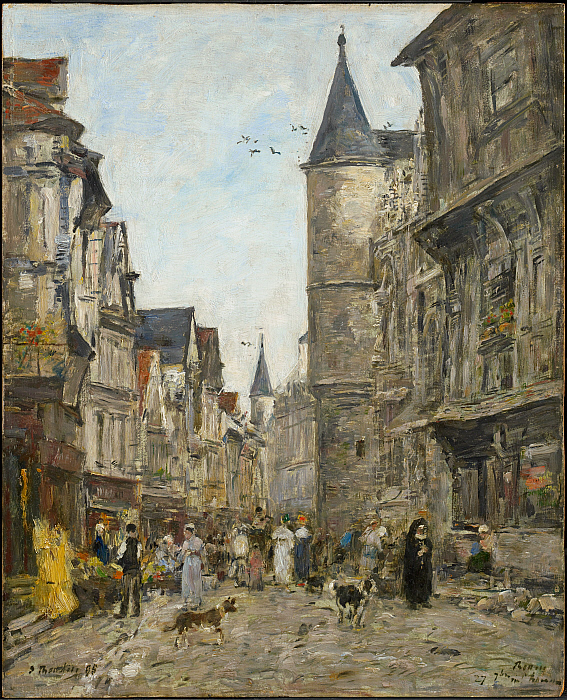
Rue Saint-Romain, Rouen (1895), oil on panel, 18 1/8 x 14 5/8 in. (46 x 37.2 cm) Frame: 26 3/4 x 23 1/2 x 2 1/8 in. (67.9 x 59.7 x 5.4 cm), Clark Art Institute

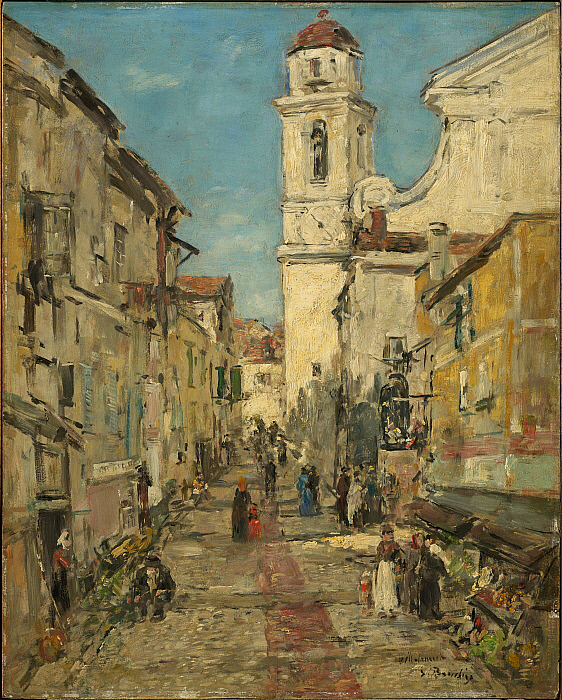
Villefranche (1892), oil on panel, 16 1/8 x 12 7/8 in. (41 x 32.7 cm) Frame: 22 3/4 × 19 3/4 × 2 5/8 in. (57.8 × 50.2 × 6.7 cm), Clark Art Institute

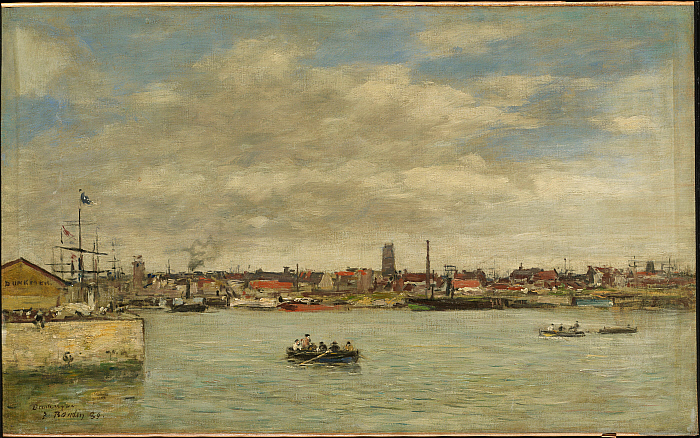
Dunkerque (1889), oil on canvas, 14 3/8 x 23 1/16 in. (36.5 x 58.6 cm) Frame: 2 1/2 x 21 11/16 x 29 9/16 in. (6.4 x 55.1 x 75.1 cm), Clark Art Institute

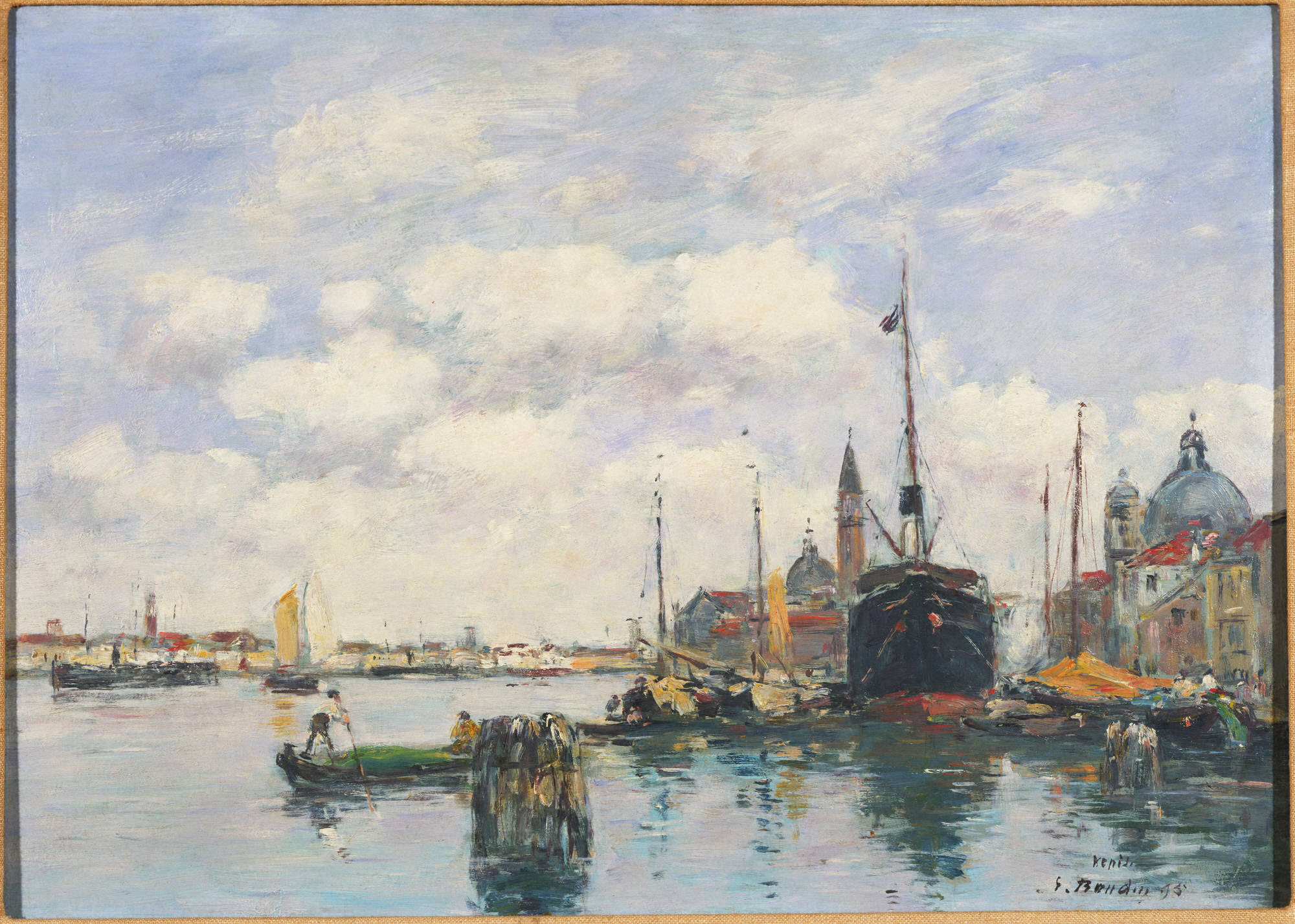
Venice-Seascape at the Giudecca (1895), Princeton University Art Museum

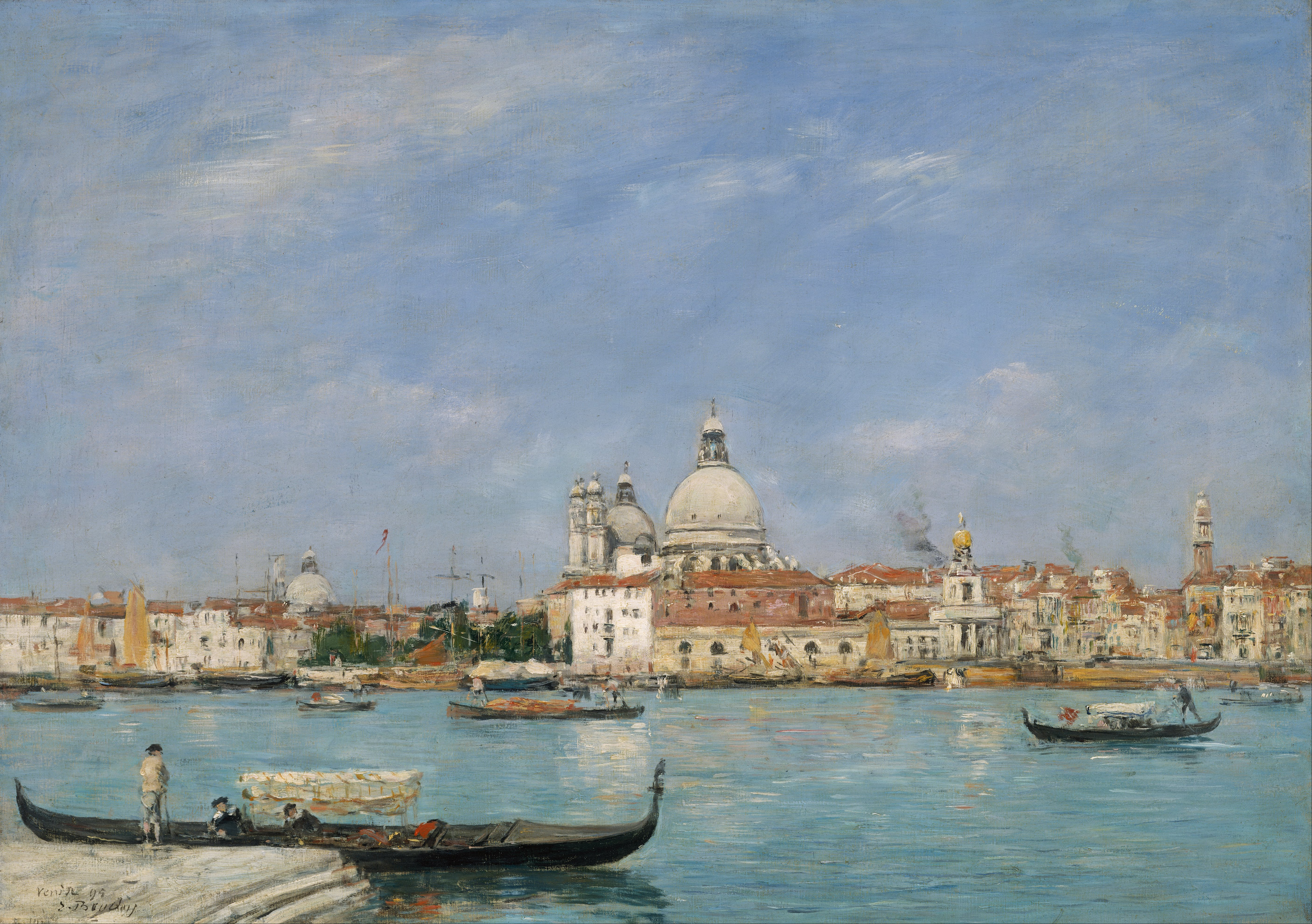
Venice, Santa Maria della Salute from San Giorgio (1895), Museum of Fine Arts, Boston

The Eugène Boudin Prize is an award given by the Société Nationale des Beaux-Arts. Among the laureates of this award, the following painters were nominated:

- Maurice Boitel, in 1989.
