= Trouville-sur-Mer =

- Commune
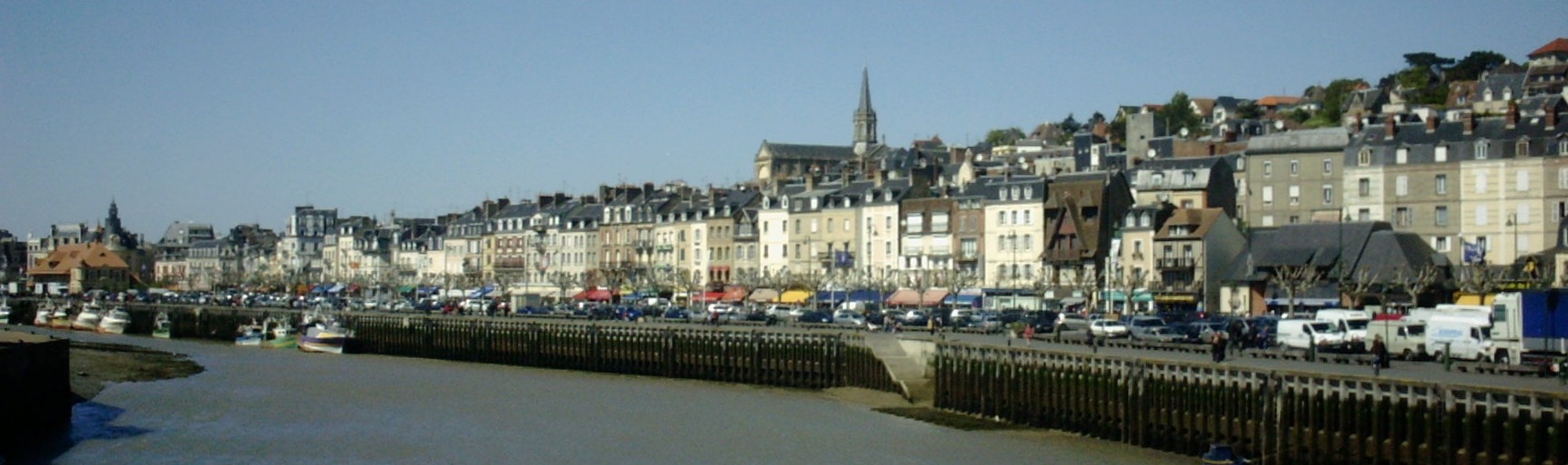
- Banks of the Touques River

- Coat of arms
- Location of Trouville-sur-Mer
- Location within France Location within Normandy
- Coordinates: 49°22′06″N 0°04′57″E
- Country: France
- Region: Normandy
- Department: Calvados
- Arrondissement: Lisieux
- Canton: Honfleur-Deauville
- Intercommunality: CC Cœur Côte Fleurie

Government
  - Mayor (2020–2026): Sylvie de Gaetano
- Area^{1}: 6.79 km^{2} (2.62 sq mi)
- Elevation: 5 m (16 ft)
- Highest elevation: 148 m (486 ft)
- Lowest elevation: 0 m (0 ft)
- Population (2023): 4,619
  - Density: 680/km^{2} (1,760/sq mi)
- Time zone: UTC+01:00 (CET)
  - Summer (DST): UTC+02:00 (CEST)
- INSEE/Postal code: 14715 /14360
- ^{1} French Land Register data, which excludes lakes, ponds, glaciers > 1 km^{2} (0.386 sq mi or 247 acres) and river estuaries.

Trouville-sur-Mer (French pronunciation: [tʁuvil syʁ mɛʁ], literally Trouville on Sea), commonly referred to as Trouville, is a city of 4,603 inhabitants in the Calvados department in the Normandy region in northwestern France.

Trouville-sur-Mer borders Deauville across the River Touques. This fishing-village on the English Channel became a popular tourist attraction (beach-resort and holiday-destination) in Normandy from the 19th century. Its long sandy beach earned then the nickname of "queen of the beaches" ("Reine des plages") or "most beautiful beach in the world".

The name of Trouville is frequently associated with the names of the numerous painters that visited it and painted there, especially during the second part of the XIXth century: Claude Monet, Eugène Boudin, Raoul Dufy, Pierre-Auguste Renoir, Gustave Caillebotte, Fernand Léger, etc.

Trouville remains today a city of leisure and vacation with a casino and numerous festivals, as well as a city of culture (Marcel Proust, Marguerite Duras, Raymond Savignac, etc.). Numerous celebrities own vacation homes in the city: Gérard Depardieu, Antoine de Caunes, Bettina Rheims, Jean-Paul Belmondo, Karl Zéro, etc.

Close to Paris and easily accessible by train, Trouville (as well as neighbouring Deauville) earned the nickname of 21st "Arrondissements of Paris".

== Gallery ==
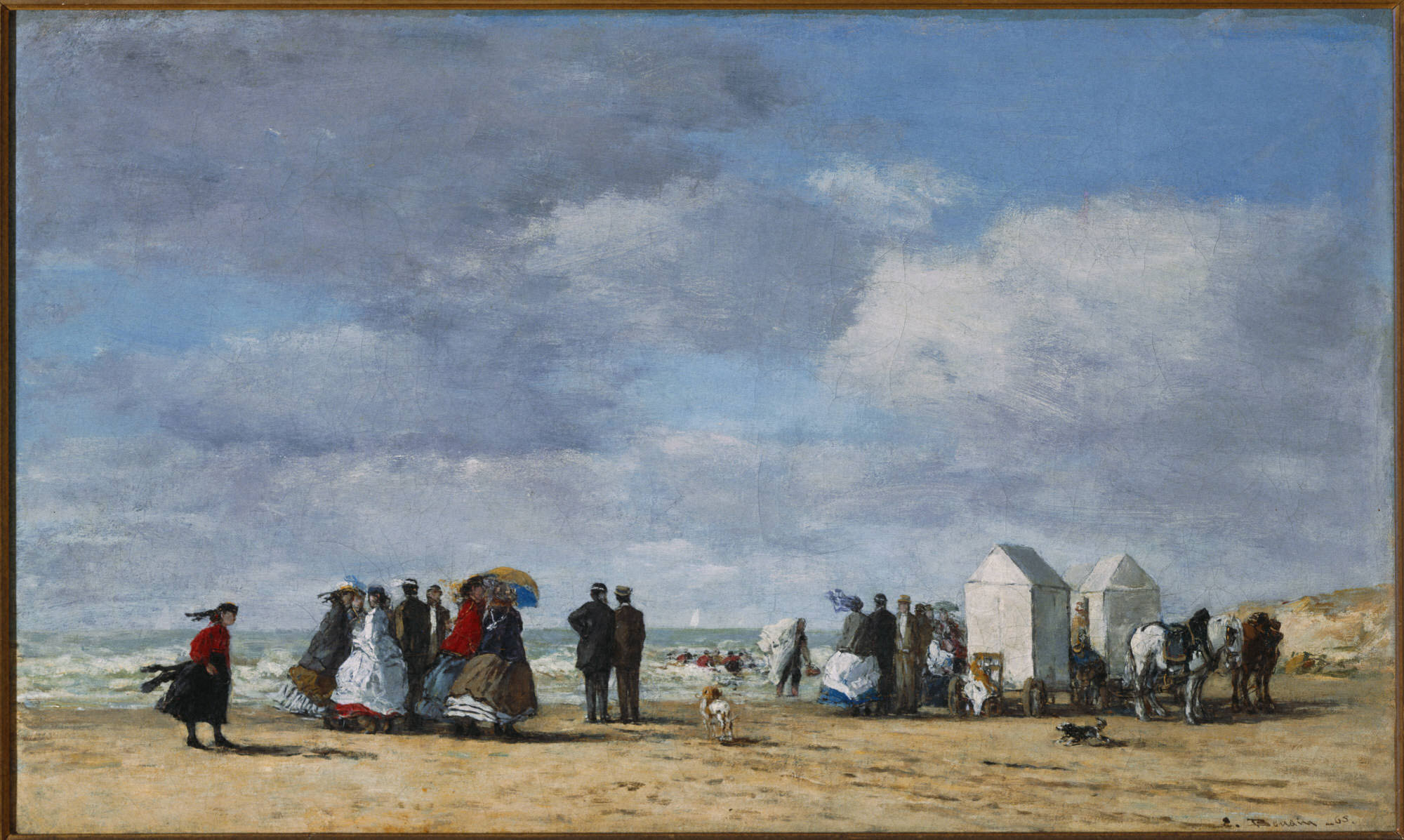
Eugène Boudin, The Beach at Trouville, 1865, Princeton University Art Museum

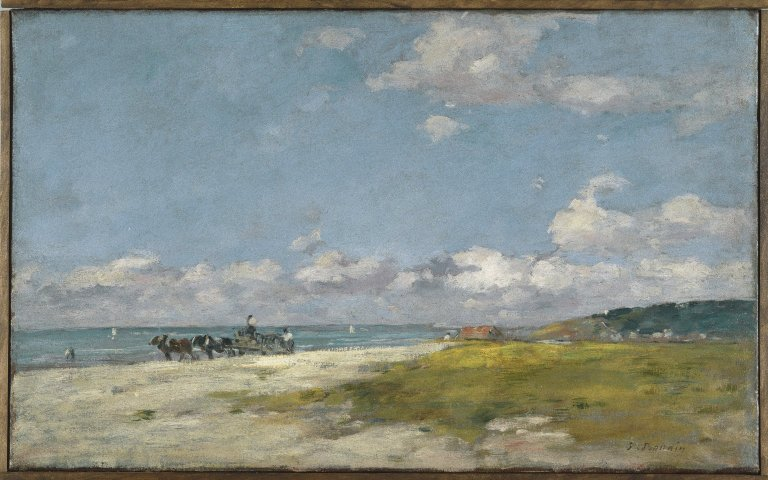
Eugène Boudin, The Beach at Trouville (Trouville, La Plage), Brooklyn Museum

== Population ==
The town's inhabitants are called Trouvillais in French.

Historical population

Year	Pop.	±% p.a.
1793	938	—
1800	628	−5.57%
1806	1,072	+9.32%
1821	1,236	+0.95%
1831	1,464	+1.71%
1836	1,673	+2.70%
1841	1,887	+2.44%
1846	2,267	+3.74%
1851	3,504	+9.10%
1856	4,163	+3.51%
1861	5,200	+4.55%
1866	5,694	+1.83%
1872	5,761	+0.20%
1876	5,886	+0.54%
1881	6,263	+1.25%
1886	6,308	+0.14%
1891	6,243	−0.21%
1896	6,264	+0.07%
1901	6,137	−0.41%

Year	Pop.	±% p.a.
1906	6,401	+0.85%
1911	6,190	−0.67%
1921	6,262	+0.12%
1926	6,514	+0.79%
1931	6,465	−0.15%
1936	6,182	−0.89%
1946	7,585	+2.07%
1954	7,040	−0.93%
1962	6,622	−0.76%
1968	6,429	−0.49%
1975	6,618	+0.41%
1982	6,008	−1.37%
1990	5,607	−0.86%
1999	5,411	−0.39%
2007	4,928	−1.16%
2012	4,758	−0.70%
2017	4,628	−0.55%
2023	4,619	−0.03%

Source: EHESS and INSEE (1968–2023)

== International relations ==
Trouville-sur-Mer is twinned with:

- Barnstaple, England, United Kingdom
- Vrchlabí, Czech Republic

== See also ==
- Communes of the Calvados department
